= List of Melanesian Championships in Athletics records =

The Melanesian Championships in athletics records are the best marks set by athletes who are representing one of the member states of the Melanesian Championships Council during the correspondent athletics event which began in 2001.

== Men ==
Key: Defunct event

Event	Record	Athlete	Nationality	Date	Championships	Place	Ref.
100 m	10.20 (+1.2 m/s)	Banuve Tabakaucoro	Fiji	8 July 2016	2016 Championships	Suva, Fiji	
200 m	21.2 h (−0.4 m/s)	Wagui Anau	Australia	April 2003	2003 Championships	Lae, Papua New Guinea	
400 m	47.30	Iliesa Namosimalua	Fiji	August 2007	2007 Championships	Cairns, Australia	
800 m	1:51.73	Isireli Naikelekelevesi	Fiji	August 2007	2007 Championships	Cairns, Australia	
1500 m	4:04.55	Isireli Naikelekelevesi	Fiji	August 2007	2007 Championships	Cairns, Australia	
5000 m	15:32.18	Liam Woollett	Australia	7 July 2016	2016 Championships	Suva, Fiji	
10,000 m	32:28.7	David Kanie	Papua New Guinea	April 2003	2003 Championships	Lae, Papua New Guinea	
Half marathon	1:17:58	Bimlesh Kumar	Fiji	April 2001	2001 Championships	Suva, Fiji	
110 m hurdles	14.71 (−0.7 m/s)	Jovesa Naivalu	Fiji	August 2007	2007 Championships	Cairns, Australia	
400 m hurdles	51.43	Mowen Boino	Papua New Guinea	August 2007	2007 Championships	Cairns, Australia	
3000 m steeplechase	9:43.07	Sapolai Yao	Papua New Guinea	August 2007	2007 Championships	Cairns, Australia	
High jump	2.09 m	Malakai Kaiwalu	Fiji	8 July 2016	2016 Championships	Suva, Fiji	
Long jump	7.40 m (±0.0 m/s)	Waisale Dausoko	Fiji	7 July 2016	2016 Championships	Suva, Fiji	
Triple jump	14.86 (−1.0 m/s)	Peniel Richard	Papua New Guinea	9 July 2016	2016 Championships	Suva, Fiji	
Shot put	15.08 m	Mustafa Fall	Fiji	9 July 2016	2016 Championships	Suva, Fiji	
Discus throw	50.28 m	Mustafa Fall	Fiji	7 July 2016	2016 Championships	Suva, Fiji	
Hammer throw	59.35 m	Costa Kousparis	Australia	8 July 2016	2016 Championships	Suva, Fiji	
Javelin throw	79.22 m	Leslie Copeland	Fiji	7 July 2016	2016 Championships	Suva, Fiji	
Octathlon				July 2016	2016 Championships	Suva, Fiji	
20 km walk (road)	1:56:04	Rajeev Patel	Fiji	April 2001	2001 Championships	Suva, Fiji	
4 × 100 m relay	41.40		Fiji	August 2009	2009 Championships	Gold Coast, Australia	
4 × 100 m relay	41.4 h	Jeffrey Bai; Wally Kirika; Henry Ben; Peter Pulu	Papua New Guinea	April 2003	2003 Championships	Lae, Papua New Guinea	
4 × 400 m relay	3:16.23	Iliesa Namosimalua; Isireli Naikelekelevesi; William McGoon; Niko Verekauta	Fiji	August 2007	2007 Championships	Cairns, Australia	
Sprint medley relay	1:30.36	Sam Toleman; Adam Farlow; Tjimarri Sanderson-Milera; Alexander Carew	Australia	7 July 2016	2016 Championships	Suva, Fiji	

== Women ==
Key: Defunct event

Event	Record	Athlete	Nationality	Date	Championships	Place	Ref.
100 m	11.44 (+0.3 m/s)	Toea Wisil	Papua New Guinea	8 July 2016	2016 Championships	Suva, Fiji	
200 m	23.26 (+0.4 m/s)	Makelesi Bulikiobo	Fiji	August 2007	2007 Championships	Cairns, Australia	
400 m	53.66	Makelesi Bulikiobo	Fiji	August 2007	2007 Championships	Cairns, Australia	
800 m	2:09.25	Salome Dell	Papua New Guinea	August 2009	2009 Championships	Gold Coast, Australia	
1500 m	4:38.95	Tia Brady	Australia	9 July 2016	2016 Championships	Suva, Fiji	
3000 m	10:12.93	Ruby Smee	Australia	July 2016	2016 Championships	Suva, Fiji	
5000 m	18:36.75	Sharon Firisua	Solomon Islands	7 July 2016	2016 Championships	Suva, Fiji	
10,000 m	38:58.43	Sharon Firisua	Solomon Islands	8 July 2016	2016 Championships	Suva, Fiji	
100 m hurdles	14.14 (+0.9 m/s)	Eliana Seymour	Australia	7 July 2016	2016 Championships	Suva, Fiji	
400 m hurdles	1:03.24	Sharon Henry	Papua New Guinea	August 2007	2007 Championships	Cairns, Australia	
3000 m steeplechase	11:54.71	Poro Gahekave	Papua New Guinea	August 2007	2007 Championships	Cairns, Australia	
High jump	1.80 m	Hannah Joye	Australia	8 July 2016	2016 Championships	Suva, Fiji	
Long jump	5.95 m (+0.1 m/s)	Rellie Kaputin	Papua New Guinea	7 July 2016	2016 Championships	Suva, Fiji	
Triple jump	12.25 (−2.6 m/s)	Rellie Kaputin	Papua New Guinea	9 July 2016	2016 Championships	Suva, Fiji	
Shot put	11.19 m	Kelly Humphries	Australia	August 2009	2009 Championships	Gold Coast, Australia	
Discus throw	45.68 m	Karen Clarke	Australia	7 July 2016	2016 Championships	Suva, Fiji	
Hammer throw	44.22 m	Kelly Humphries	Australia	August 2009	2009 Championships	Gold Coast, Australia	
Javelin throw	47.17 m	Tianah List	Australia	8 July 2016	2016 Championships	Suva, Fiji	
Heptathlon	4889 pts	Adrine Monagi	Papua New Guinea	7–8 July 2016	2016 Championships	Suva, Fiji	
Heptathlon	100m H / High jump / Shot put / 200m / Long jump / Javelin / 800m; 14.48 (NWI) / 1.66 m / 9.97 m / 25.32 (NWI) / 5.32 m (+0.2 m/s) / 36.46 m / 2:36.31						
5000 m walk (track)	24:19.22	Simone Mcinnes	Australia	8 July 2016	2016 Championships	Suva, Fiji	
4 × 100 m relay	47.03	Alesi Finau; Sisilia Seavula; Aleiwalu Rayawa; Makereta Naulu	Fiji	9 July 2016	2016 Championships	Suva, Fiji	
4 × 400 m relay	3:54.12	Ann Mooney; Sharon Henry; Eunice Steven; Toea Wisil	Papua New Guinea	August 2007	2007 Championships	Cairns, Australia	
Sprint medley relay	1:45.27	Nicole Reynolds; Jessie Andrew; Emily Coppins; Rebecca Bennett	Australia	7 July 2016	2016 Championships	Suva, Fiji	
