= 2010 Oceania Athletics Championships =

10th Oceania Athletics Championships
- Dates: 23–25 September
- Host city: Cairns, Australia
- Venue: Barlow Park
- Level: Senior
- Type: Outdoor
- Events: 39 (20 men, 18 women, 1 mixed)
- Participation: 23 nations

The 2010 Oceania Athletics Championships was the 10th edition of the Oceania Athletics Championships, organised under the supervision of the Oceania Athletic Association, in Cairns, Queensland, Australia in September. It was fourth time the championship were held in Australia. Athletes competed at two age categories: Junior (U20) and open senior. Indonesia also competed at the championships as a guest nation. The three-day competition took place from 23 to 25 September.

== Medal table ==
| Rank | Nation | Gold | Silver | Bronze | Total |
|---|---|---|---|---|---|
| 1 | Australia | 16 | 11 | 8 | 35 |
| 2 | New Zealand | 7 | 10 | 4 | 21 |
| 3 | Papua New Guinea | 7 | 8 | 8 | 23 |
| 4 | Fiji | 3 | 0 | 1 | 4 |
| 5 | New Caledonia | 2 | 0 | 2 | 4 |
| 6 | French Polynesia | 1 | 2 | 2 | 5 |
| 7 | Samoa | 1 | 1 | 1 | 3 |
| 8 | Tonga | 1 | 0 | 0 | 1 |
| 9 | American Samoa | 0 | 2 | 0 | 2 |
| 10 | Kiribati | 0 | 1 | 0 | 1 |
| 11 | Vanuatu | 0 | 0 | 2 | 2 |
| 12 | Nauru | 0 | 0 | 1 | 1 |
| 12 | Palau | 0 | 0 | 1 | 1 |
| Totals (13 entries) | | 38 | 35 | 30 | 103 |

== Medal summary ==
The results were published.

=== Men ===
| Event | Gold | | Silver | | Bronze | |
|---|---|---|---|---|---|---|
| 100 m^{†} (wind: -0.5 m/s) | Liam Gander; Australia | 10.60 | Nelson Stone; Papua New Guinea | 10.61 | Isaac Tatoa; New Zealand | 10.96 |
| 200 m (wind: +0.5 m/s) | Nelson Stone; Papua New Guinea | 21.09 CR NR | Liam Gander; Australia | 21.43 | Epeli Kavarua; Fiji | 21.83 |
| 400 m | Sean Wroe; Australia | 46.62 CR | Nelson Stone; Papua New Guinea | 47.06 | Wala Gime; Papua New Guinea | 48.39 |
| 800 m | Jeremy Roff; Australia | 1:51.60 | Tim Hawkes; New Zealand | 1:53.24 | Arnold Sorina; Vanuatu | 1:53.37 |
| 1500 m | Jeremy Roff; Australia | 3:41.91 CR | Aniel Smith; New Zealand | 3:57.20 | Michael Roger; Australia | 3:58.73 |
| 5000 m | Jeffrey Hunt; Australia | 14:41.97 CR | Kupsy Bisamo; Papua New Guinea | 16:02.71 | Francky Maraetaata; French Polynesia | 16:07.63 |
| 10000 m | Francky Maraetaata; French Polynesia | 33:16.22 CR | Kupsy Bisamo; Papua New Guinea | 33:21.16 | Philipe Nausien; Vanuatu | 34:35.47 |
| 110 m hurdles (wind: -0.5 m/s) | Greg Eyears; Australia | 14.20 CR | Daniel Small; Australia | 15.71 | /Xavier Fenuafanote; New Caledonia | 15.97 |
| 400 m hurdles | Daniel O'Shea; New Zealand | 51.68 | Mowen Boino; Papua New Guinea | 51.84 | Wala Gime; Papua New Guinea | 52.36 |
| 3000 m steeplechase | Sapolai Yao; Papua New Guinea | 10:00.07 | Skene Kiage; Papua New Guinea | 10:16.95 | | |
| 4 × 100 m | Fiji; Beniamino Maravu; Ratu Laisiasa Tuisawau; Epeli Kavarua; Ratu Banuve Tabakaucoro | 42.02 | New Zealand; Nick Ash; Michael Wilson; Daniel O'Shea; Isaac Tatoa | 42.20 | Australia; Jay Stone; Greg Eyears; Cameron Clayton; James Roff; Daniel Small* | 43.05 |
| High jump | Josh Hall; Australia | 2.20 CR | David Birati; Kiribati | 1.93 NR | Norman Tse; Papua New Guinea | 1.93 |
| Long jump | /Frédéric Erin; New Caledonia | 7.70 w (wind: +5.4 m/s) | Raihau Maiau; French Polynesia | 7.64 w (wind: +4.3 m/s) | Norman Tse; Papua New Guinea | 6.97 w (wind: +2.2 m/s) |
| Triple jump | /Frédéric Erin; New Caledonia | 15.45 CR (wind: +1.4 m/s) | Mong Tavol; Papua New Guinea | 14.35 w (wind: +2.8 m/s) | Todd Swanson; New Zealand | 14.06 w (wind: +2.6 m/s) |
| Shot put | Scott Martin; Australia | 19.55 CR | Dale Stevenson; Australia | 19.41 | Emanuele Fuamatu; Samoa | 16.54 |
| Dicus throw | Marshall Hall; New Zealand | 51.53 | Kerisiano Tongalea; New Zealand | 49.48 | /Daniel Kilama; New Caledonia | 46.02 |
| Hammer throw | Timothy Driesen; Australia | 66.59 CR | Simon Wardhaugh; Australia | 66.11 | Thomas McGuire; Australia | 48.45 |
| Javelin throw | Leslie Copeland; Fiji | 75.08 CR | Ben Langton-Burnell; New Zealand | 60.38 | | |
| Octathlon | Inoke Finau; Tonga | 4767 | Aaron Victorian III; American Samoa | 4681^{‡} | Leon Mengloi; Palau | 4678 |
| Decathlon | Scott McLaren; Australia | 7308 CR | Aaron Victorian III; American Samoa | 5793 | | |

^{†}: In the 100 m event, Suryo Agung Wibowo from Indonesia running as guest was 1st in 10.52 s.
^{‡}: Result extracted from decathlon.
* Runners who participated in the heats only.

=== Women ===
| Event | Gold | | Silver | | Bronze | |
|---|---|---|---|---|---|---|
| 100 m (wind: +1.0 m/s) | Toea Wisil; Papua New Guinea | 11.85 | Rochelle Coster; New Zealand | 11.93 | Sarah Busby; Australia | 12.03 |
| 200 m (wind: +2.6 m/s) | Toea Wisil; Papua New Guinea | 23.63 w | Kendra Hubbard; Australia | 24.51 w | Helen Philemon; Papua New Guinea | 25.12 w |
| 400 m | Pirrenee Steinert; Australia | 53.63 CR | Betty Burua; Papua New Guinea | 54.33 | Salome Dell; Papua New Guinea | 54.49 |
| 800 m | Salome Dell; Papua New Guinea | 2:07.55 CR | Alice Platten; Australia | 2:08.43 | Betty Burua; Papua New Guinea | 2:15.09 |
| 1500 m | Salome Dell; Papua New Guinea | 4:38.58 | | | | |
| 100 m hurdles^{†} (wind: -0.4 m/s) | Andrea Miller; New Zealand | 13.55 CR | Rochelle Coster; New Zealand | 14.67 | | |
| 400 m hurdles | Lisa Spencer; Australia | 60.58 | Cara White; Australia | 66.25 | Lauren McAdam; Australia | 66.85 |
| 3000 m steeplechase | Sarah McSweeney; New Zealand | 11:14.44 | | | | |
| 4 × 100 m | Papua New Guinea; Mae Koime; Toea Wisil; Betty Burua; Helen Philemon | 46.86 CR | Australia; Kendra Hubbard; Alice Platten; Lisa Spencer; Sarah Busby | 47.33 | New Zealand; Lauren Wilson; Rebecca Gibson; Rochelle Coster; Andrea Miller | 48.33 |
| High jump | Elizabeth Lamb; New Zealand | 1.80 =CR | Ellen Pettitt; Australia | 1.74 | Tara Strano; Australia | 1.71 |
| Long jump | Marissa Pritchard; New Zealand | 5.81 w (wind: +3.8 m/s) | Terani Faremiro; French Polynesia | 5.62 (wind: +2.0 m/s) | Helen Philemon; Papua New Guinea | 5.60 w (wind: +3.2 m/s) |
| Triple jump | Katie Cox; Australia | 12.33 w (wind: +3.4 m/s) | Nneka Okpala; New Zealand | 12.21 w (wind: +3.0 m/s) | Terani Faremiro; French Polynesia | 11.14 w (wind: +5.1 m/s) |
| Shot put | Margaret Satupai; Samoa | 15.95 NR | Joanne Mirtschin; Australia | 15.42 | Nina Grundler; Nauru | 9.59 |
| Discus throw | Beatrice Faumuina; New Zealand | 58.32 CR | Margaret Satupai; Samoa | 51.42 NR | Merewarihi Vaka; New Zealand | 47.23 |
| Hammer throw | Bronwyn Eagles; Australia | 62.99 CR | Gabrielle Neighbour; Australia | 62.10 | Karyne Di Marco; Australia | 61.89 |
| Javelin throw | Karen Clarke; Australia | 48.82 | | | | |
| Heptathlon^{‡} | | | | | | |
| 10 km walk (road) | Nicole Fagan; Australia | 52:31 | Roseanne Robinson; New Zealand | 53:43 | | |

^{†}: In the 100 m hurdles event, Dedeh Erawati from Indonesia running as guest was 2nd in 13.84s.
^{‡}: In heptathlon, the only competitor, Rebecca Wardell from New Zealand, did not finish.

=== Mixed ===
| Event | Gold | | Silver | | Bronze | |
|---|---|---|---|---|---|---|
| 800 metres Medley relay | Fiji; Sera Tuinalase; Ratu Banuve Tabakaucoro; Suliana Gusuivalu; Beniamino Maravu | 1:35.31 | New Zealand; Rochelle Coster; Michael Wilson; Rebecca Gibson; Tim Hawkes | 1:36.73 | Australia; Sarah Busby; Greg Eyears; Cara White; Jay Stone | 1:37.35 |

During championships handicapped athletes also competed at invited events.
