= List of Papua New Guinean records in athletics =

The following are the national records in athletics in Papua New Guinea maintained by PNG's national athletics federation: Athletics Papua New Guinea.

== Outdoor ==
Key to tables: Awaiting ratification Record not kept by Athletics Papua New Guinea Not ratified or later rescinded by Athletics Papua New Guinea

# = not ratified by federation

=== Men ===
Event	Record	Athlete	Date	Meet	Place	Ref.
60 m	6.64 (+1.6 m/s)	Pais Wisil	25 January 2025	ACT Open Championships	Canberra, Australia	
100 m	10.24 (+1.2 m/s)	Pais Wisil	15 March 2025	Queensland State Championships	Brisbane, Australia	
100 m	10.24 (−3.0 m/s)	Tovetuna Tuna	1 May 2025	Texas Tech Corky/Crofoot Shootout	Lubbock, United States	
150 m	15.84	Peter Pulu	14 August 1995	National Championships	Pirae, French Polynesia	
200 m	20.64 (+1.4 m/s)	Tovetuna Tuna	1 May 2025	Texas Tech Corky/Crofoot Shootout	Lubbock, United States	
300 m	33.99	Nelson Stone	26 June 2010		Queensland, Australia	
300 m	33.9 h	Baobo Neuendorf	28 January 1993		Brisbane, Australia	
300 m	33.9 h	Subul Babo	14 August 1995		Pirae, French Polynesia	
300 m	33.9 h	Geoffrey Bai	1 April 1999		Lae, Papua New Guinea	
300 m	33.9 h	Peter Pulu	15 January 2003		Port Moresby, Papua New Guinea	
400 m	46.70	Nelson Stone	8 October 2010	Commonwealth Games	Delhi, India	
600 m	1:21.63	Paulson Gebo	25 May 2007		Brisbane, Australia	
800 m	1:48.29	Clement Abai	20 April 2002	LSU Invitational	Baton Rouge, Louisiana, United States	
1000 m	2:27.36	Sebastine Sena	14 August 1995		Pirae, French Polynesia	
1500 m	3:59.02	Aquila Turalom	30 November 2023	Pacific Games	Honiara, Solomon Islands	
Mile	4:19.14	Jiuteis Robinson	29 July 2026	Commonwealth Games	Glasgow, United Kingdom	
2000 m	5:45.13	Sapolai Yao	22 July 2007		Brisbane, Australia	
3000 m	8:45.55	Sapolai Yao	10 March 2006		Brisbane, Australia	
5000 m	14:43.4 h	John Kokinai	10 September 1972		Rabaul, Papua New Guinea	
10,000 m	31:21.4 h	Tau John Tokwepota	1976		Lae, Papua New Guinea	
Half marathon	1:11:16	Sapolai Yao	4 July 2010	Gold Coast Half Marathon	Gold Coast, Australia	
Marathon	2:28:13	Tau John Tokwepota	7 December 1980	Honolulu Marathon	Honolulu, Hawaii, United States	
110 m hurdles	14.04 (+1.9 m/s)	Wala Gime	23 May 2014	NCAA Division II Championships	Allendale, United States	
200 m hurdles	25.56	Wala Gime	21 August 2011		Gold Coast, Queensland, Australia	
300 m hurdles	37.06	Ivan Wakit	14 August 1995		Pirae, French Polynesia	
400 m hurdles	50.37	Mowen Boino	21 March 2006	Commonwealth Games	Melbourne, Australia	
3000 m steeplechase	9:25.8 h	John Kokinai	27 August 1971		Port Moresby, Papua New Guinea	
3000 m steeplechase	9:25.8 h (Note: unconfirmed)	Tau John Tokwepota	9 March 1978		Brisbane, Australia	
3000 m steeplechase	9:22.06	Aquila Turalom	14 March 2024	Queensland Championships	Brisbane, Australia	
High jump	2.06 m	Hapo Maliaki	29 September 1996		Port Moresby, Papua New Guinea	
High jump	2.06 m	Sandy Katusele	10 July 2003	South Pacific Games	Suva, Fiji	
Pole vault	4.20 m	Erich Momberger	6 August 1992	Olympic Games	Barcelona, Spain	
Long jump	7.26 m (±0.0 m/s)	Peniel Richard	8 May 2021	Lone Star Championships	Canyon, United States	
Long jump	7.32 m	Idau Michael Asigau	17 July 2015	Pacific Games	Port Moresby, Papua New Guinea	
Triple jump	15.66 m (+1.1 m/s)	Peniel Richard	15 May 2022	WT Last Chance Meet	Canyon, United States	
Shot put	15.64 m	De'bono Paraka	30 June 2017	Oceania Championships	Suva, Fiji	
Discus throw	52.60 m	De'bono Paraka	13 April 2018	Commonwealth Games	Gold Coast, Australia	
Discus throw	53.33 m	De'bono Paraka	8 June 2022	Oceania Championships	Mackay, Australia	
Hammer throw	39.45 m	De'bono Paraka	10 December 2017		Suva, Fiji	
Javelin throw	72.26 m	Lakona Gerega	21 May 2026	Oceania Championships	Darwin, Australia	
Decathlon	7178 pts	Erich Momberger	27–28 June 1992		Emmitsburg, United States	
Decathlon	100m (wind) / Long jump (wind) / Shot put / High jump / 400m / 110m H (wind) / Discus / Pole vault / Javelin / 1500m; 11.07 (±0.0 m/s) / 6.91 m (±0.0 m/s) / 13.48 m / 1.93 m / 50.10 / 15.63 (±0.0 m/s) / 38.64 m / 4.00 m / 52.20 m / 4:46.04					
3000 m walk (track)	16:35.4 h	Joe Kaikai	4 July 1993		Goroka, Papua New Guinea	
5000 m walk (track)	27:33.8 h	Jerry Sai	3 July 1994		Lae, Papua New Guinea	
20 km walk (road)	2:12:13	Joe Kaikai	14 September 1991	South Pacific Games	Port Moresby, Papua New Guinea	
50 km walk (road)						
4 × 100 m relay	40.23	Papua New Guinea; Pais Wisil; Johnny Bai; Emmanuel Anis; Tovetuna Tuna	7 July 2025	Pacific Mini Games	Koror, Palau	
4 × 200 m relay	1:26.96	Papua New Guinea; Emmanuel Wanga; Nazmie-Lee Marai; Shadrick Tansi; Daniel Baul	12 May 2019	IAAF World Relays	Yokohama, Japan	
4 × 400 m relay	3:09.55	Papua New Guinea; Takale Tuna; Baobo Neuendorf; Kaminiel Selot; Subul Babo	21 September 1991	South Pacific Games	Port Moresby, Papua New Guinea	
Distance medley relay	10:50.63	Papua New Guinea; Andipas Georasi (1200 m); Paul Pokana (400 m); Kevin Kapmatana (800 m); George Yamak (1600 m)	3 May 2015	IAAF World Relays	Nassau, Bahamas	

=== Women ===
Event	Record	Athlete	Date	Meet	Place	Ref.
60 m	7.46 NWI	Toea Wisil	March 2014		Gold Coast, Australia	
100 m	11.29 (+1.9 m/s)	Toea Wisil	9 July 2016	Melanesian Championships	Suva, Fiji	
100 m	11.29 (+2.0 m/s)	Toea Wisil	18 February 2017	Capital Territory Championships	Canberra, Australia	
150 m	18.34	Mae Koime	8 June 2008		Brisbane, Australia	
200 m	23.13 (+1.5 m/s)	Toea Wisil	11 March 2017	Summer of Aths Meeting	Canberra, Australia	
300 m	38.54	Mae Koime	25 May 2007		Brisbane, Australia	
400 m	53.19	Toea Wisil	14 August 2010		Gold Coast, Queensland, Australia	
600 m	1:32.44	Salome Dell	9 December 2010		Melbourne, Australia	
800 m	2:03.53	Salome Dell	10 October 2010	Commonwealth Games	Delhi, India	
1000 m	3:02.7 h	Rosemary Turare	6 August 1994		Abbotsford, Canada	
1500 m	4:27.77	Salome Dell	11 February 2011	Brisbane Track Classic	Brisbane, Australia	
Mile	5:08.36	Salome Dell	24 March 2007		Auckland, New Zealand	
2000 m	6:42.9 h	Rosemary Turare	19 August 1994	Commonwealth Games	Victoria, British Columbia, Canada	
3000 m	10:12.7 h	Rosemary Turare	2 August 1993		Exeter, United Kingdom	
5000 m	18:18.1 h	Rosemary Turare	30 June 1995	PNG National Championships	Lae, Papua New Guinea	
5000 m	18:09.30 Mx #	Rosemary Turare	26 July 1995		Flein, Germany	
10,000 m	38:01.73	Rosemary Turare	11 December 1993	South Pacific Mini Games	Port Vila, Vanuatu	
Half marathon	1:27:20	Rosemary Turare	5 June 1994		Port Moresby, Papua New Guinea	
Half marathon	1:27:21	Rosemary Turare	30 June 1995		Lae, Papua New Guinea	
Marathon	3:41:14	Rosemary Turare	13 November 1994		Goroka, Papua New Guinea	
100 m hurdles	13.46 (+1.5 m/s)	Adrine Monagi	14 April 2024	Australian National Championships	Adelaide, Australia	
300 m hurdles	44.05	Afure Adah	24 May 2015		Bismarck, United States	
300 m hurdles	43.29 mx	Donna Koniel	20 June 2015		Gold Coast, Australia	
400 m hurdles	58.02	Betty Burua	29 March 2015	Australian Championships	Brisbane, Australia	
2000 m steeplechase	7:13.18	Rama Kumilgo	8 May 2015	Oceania Championships	Cairns, Australia	
3000 m steeplechase	11:10.48	Rama Kumilgo	10 May 2015	Oceania Championships	Cairns, Australia	
High jump	1.77 m	Rellie Kaputin	14 July 2015	Pacific Games	Port Moresby, Papua New Guinea	
Pole vault	2.30 m	Delilah Kami	14 June 2015		Brisbane, Australia	
Long jump	6.50 m (+0.9 m/s)	Rellie Kaputin	25 June 2019	Oceania Championships	Townsville, Australia	
Triple jump	13.28 m (+1.4 m/s)	Rellie Kaputin	27 May 2017	NCAA Division II Championships	Bradenton, United States	
Shot put	13.50 m	Iammogapi Launa	17 September 1991	South Pacific Games	Port Moresby, Papua New Guinea	
Discus throw	38.96 m	Sharon Toako	November 2020		Port Moresby, Papua New Guinea	
Hammer throw	47.99 m	Jacklyn Travertz	16 July 2019	Pacific Games	Apia, Samoa	
Javelin throw	49.18 m (new design)	Sharon Toako	25 May 2019		Kingsville, United States	
Javelin throw	51.96 m (old design)	Iammo Launa	20 May 1995		Port Moresby, Papua New Guinea	
Heptathlon	5221 pts	Adrine Monagi	15–16 March 2017	Angelo State Spring Break Multi Meet	San Angelo, United States	
Heptathlon	100m H (wind) / High jump / Shot put / 200m (wind) / Long jump (wind) / Javelin / 800m; 14.31 (±0.0 m/s) / 1.55 m / 11.04 m / 25.19 (+2.0 m/s) / 5.65 m (+2.6 m/s) / 38.58 m / 2:25.01					
20 km walk (road)						
50 km walk (road)						
4 × 100 m relay	45.38	Papua New Guinea; Adrine Monagi; Toea Wisil; Isila Apkup; Leonie Beu	6 August 2022	Commonwealth Games	Birmingham, United Kingdom	
4 × 200 m relay	1:43.85	Papua New Guinea; Leonie Beu; Isila Apkup; Edna Boafob; Adrine Monagi	12 May 2019	IAAF World Relays	Yokohama, Japan	
4 × 400 m relay	3:40.40	Papua New Guinea; Betty Burua; Salome Dell; Toea Wisil; Helen Philemon	11 October 2010	Commonwealth Games	Delhi, India	

=== Mixed ===
Event	Record	Athletes	Date	Meet	Place	Ref.
4 × 100 m relay	43.05	Papua New Guinea; Adrine Monagi; Leroy Kamau; Leonie Beu; Pais Wisil	24 June 2023	Oceania Cup	Saipan, Northern Mariana Islands	
4 × 400 m relay	3:28.48	Papua New Guinea; Benjamin Aliel; Leonie Beu; Daniel Baul; Isila Apkup	7 June 2024	Oceania Championships	Suva, Fiji	
2×2×400 m relay	4:04.73	Papua New Guinea; Daniel Baul; Donna Koniel	11 May 2019	IAAF World Relays	Yokohama, Japan	
Shuttle hurdle relay	1:07.32	Papua New Guinea; Adrine Monagi; Mowen Boino; Donna Koniel; Daniel Baul	11 May 2019	IAAF World Relays	Yokohama, Japan	

== Indoor ==
=== Men ===
Event	Record	Athlete	Date	Meet	Place	Ref.
55 m	6.37	Peter Pulu	15 February 2003		Los Angeles, United States	
60 m	6.66	Pais Wisil	21 March 2025	World Championships	Nanjing, China	
200 m	21.67 A	Wesley Logorava	2 March 2018	NJCAA Championships	Lubbock, United States	
400 m	48.79	Wala Gime	10 February 2012	Tyson Invitational	Fayetteville, United States	
400 m	48.08 A OT	Geoffrey Bai	7 February 2004		Flagstaff, United States	
400 m	48.67	Emmanuel Wanga	14 January 2024		Lincoln, United States	
600 m	1:17.56	Adolf Kauba	7 March 2025	NJCAA Championships	Lubbock, United States	
800 m	1:51.61	Clement Abai	10 February 2002		Gainesville, United States	
1000 m	2:45.05	Sapolai Yao	26 January 2013		Mankato, United States	
1500 m						
3000 m						
5000 m	15:52.91	Sapolai Yao	16 February 2013		Storm Lake, United States	
55 m hurdles	7.61	Wala Gime	1 March 2013		Lubbock, United States	
60 m hurdles	8.42	Wala Gime	25 January 2013	Jack Jennett Invitational	Cedar Falls, United States	
400 m hurdles	54.94	Wala Gime	25 January 2013	Jack Jennett Invitational	Cedar Falls, United States	
High jump	1.95 m	Peniel Richard	19 February 2017	Lone Star Conference Championships	Alamosa, United States	
Pole vault	4.11 m	Erich Momberger	27 February 1992		Norman, United States	
Long jump	7.02 m	Peniel Richard	19 February 2017	Lone Star Conference Championships	Alamosa, United States	
Triple jump	15.22 m	Peniel Richard	19 February 2017	Lone Star Conference Championships	Alamosa, United States	
Shot put	13.88 m	Erich Momberger	19 January 1991		Pittsburgh, United States	
Heptathlon	4533 pts OT	Robson Yinambe	3–4 March 2017	NJCAA Championships	Pittsburgh, United States	
Heptathlon	60m / Long jump / Shot put / High jump / 60m H / Pole vault / 1000m; 7.23 / 6.42 m / 9.90 m / 1.83 m / 8.85 / 3.25 m / 2:54.19					
5000 m walk						
4 × 400 m relay						

=== Women ===
Event	Record	Athlete	Date	Meet	Place	Ref.
55 m	7.37	Adrine Monagi	18 January 2014	Dordt Indoor Open	Sioux Center, United States	
60 m	7.46	Isila Apkup	27 February 2026	Rocky Mountain Athletic Conference Championships	Gunnison, United States	
200 m	24.38	Leonie Beu	28 February 2025	Conference USA Championships	Lynchburg, Virginia, United States	
300 m	40.12	Betty Burua	18 February 2011	SEMO Redhawks Invitational	Cape Girardeau, United States	
400 m	55.48	Betty Burua	26 February 2011	SWAC Championship	Baton Rouge, United States	
500 m	1:20.32	Sharon Kwarula	10 February 2012	Augustana Invitational	Rock Island, United States	
600 m	1:36.88	Betty Burua	18 February 2011	SEMO Redhawks Invitational	Cape Girardeau, United States	
800 m	2:18.15	Poro Gahekave	17 February 2019	Lone Star Conference Championships	Lubbock, United States	
1000 m	3:05.94	Cecilia Kumalalamene	10 February 2012	Augustana Invitational	Rock Island, United States	
1500 m	6:26.95y	Betty Burua	23 January 2009		Baton Rouge, United States	
Mile	5:23.93	Cecilia Kumalalamene	1/2 February 2013	Varsity Apartments Invitational	Wichita, United States	
3000 m	10:52.83	Poro Gahekave	4 March 2016		Winston-Salem, United States	
55 m hurdles	7.87	Sharon Kwarula	1 March 2015	Lone Star Conference Championship	Lubbock, United States	
60 m hurdles	8.46	Sharon Kwarula	13 March 2015	NCAA Division II Championships	Birmingham, United States	
High jump	1.73 m	Rellie Kaputin	11 March 2017	NCAA Division II Championships	Birmingham, United States	
Pole vault						
Long jump	6.27 m A	Rellie Kaputin	19 February 2017	Lone Star Conference Championship	Alamosa, United States	
Triple jump	13.09 m	Rellie Kaputin	11 March 2017	NCAA Division II Championships	Birmingham, United States	
Shot put	10.81 m	Adrine Monagi	3 February 2017	New Mexico Classic	Albuquerque, United States	
Weight throw	12.34 m	Sharon Toako	25 January 2019	Mines Division II Invite & Multi	Golden, United States	
Pentathlon	3677 pts	Adrine Monagi	18-19 February 2017	Lone Star Indoor Track and Field Championships	Storm Lake, United States	
Pentathlon	60m H / High jump / Shot put / Long jump / 800m; 8.72 / 1.67 m / 10.28 m / 5.50 m / 2:34.12					
3000 m walk						
4 × 400 m relay						
