= 2007 Melanesian Championships in Athletics =

IV Melanesian Championships in Athletics
- Dates: August 14–19
- Host city: Cairns, Queensland, Australia
- Venue: Barlow Park
- Level: Senior
- Events: 38 (19 men, 19 women)
- Participation: 7 + 2 local teams + 6 guest nations

The 2007 Melanesian Championships in Athletics took place between August 14–19, 2007. The event was held at the Barlow Park in Cairns, Queensland, Australia, jointly with the OAA Grand Prix Series. Many athletes utilised the competitions preparing for the upcoming IAAF World Championships in Osaka, Japan. Detailed reports were given for the OAA.

A total of 38 events were contested, 19 by men and 19 by women.

== Medal summary ==
Complete results can be found on the Oceania Athletics Association webpage, and at sportfieber.pytalhost.com.

In high jump, long jump and triple jump, as well as in shot put, discus throw, and javelin throw, there were separate open competitions for the Melanesian championships and the OAA Grand Prix Series held on different days. In the sprint events, athletes not competing for the Melanesian Championships were assigned to the B finals.

=== Men ===
Event	Gold		Silver		Bronze	
100 metres (wind: -2.4 m/s)	Otis Gowa; Jump Start Australia	10.76	Moses Kamut; Vanuatu	10.88	Wally Kirika; Papua New Guinea	10.92
100 metres (wind: -1.6 m/s) Open B (Grand Prix Series)	James Dolphin; New Zealand	10.72	Chris Donaldson; New Zealand	10.73	Henry Ben; Papua New Guinea	11.10
200 metres (wind: -2.7 m/s)	Niko Verekauta; Fiji	21.26	Iliesa Namosimalua; Fiji	21.42	Moses Kamut; Vanuatu	21.57
200 metres (wind: -1.0 m/s) Open B (Grand Prix Series)	James Dolphin; New Zealand	21.15	Andrew Yong / North Queensland	22.21	Nelson Kabitana; Solomon Islands	22.39
400 metres	Iliesa Namosimalua; Fiji	47.30 CR	Niko Verekauta; Fiji	47.31	Nelson Stone; Papua New Guinea	48.44
800 metres^{1.)}	Isireli Naikelekelevesi; Fiji	1:51.73 CR	Arnold Sorina; Vanuatu	1:55.04	Paulson Gebo; Papua New Guinea	1:56.29
1500 metres^{2.)}	Isireli Naikelekelevesi; Fiji	4:04.55 CR	Sapolai Yao; Papua New Guinea	4:05.25	Rodney Rapasi; Solomon Islands	4:10.67
5000 metres	Sapolai Yao; Papua New Guinea	15:46.95	Philip Nausien; Vanuatu	16:04.55	Rodney Rapasi; Solomon Islands	16:51.80
10000 metres	Philip Nausien; Vanuatu	35:01.83	Chris Votu; Solomon Islands	36:09.77	Rodney Rapasi; Solomon Islands	47:52.14
110 metres hurdles (wind: -0.7 m/s)	Jovesa Naivalu; Fiji	14.71 CR	Luke Devenish; Australia	15.09	Sam Giatrakos; Australia	15.41
400 metres hurdles	Mowen Boino; Papua New Guinea	51.43 CR	Jone Wainiqolo; Fiji	53.01	Wala Gime; Papua New Guinea	54.86
3000 metres steeplechase	Sapolai Yao; Papua New Guinea	9:43.07 CR	Rodney Rapasi; Solomon Islands	10:39.37	Chris Votu; Solomon Islands	11:02.78
High jump	Rajendra Prasad; Fiji	2.00m =CR	Ben Rickards; Australia	2.00m	Sam Giatrakos; Australia	1.80m
High jump Open (Grand Prix Series)	Rajendra Prasad; Fiji	1.95m	Nicholas Murchie / North Queensland	1.90m		
Long jump	Rodney Blair; Jump Start Australia	7.05m (wind: +1.4 m/s)	Hamish Nelson; Australia	6.94m (wind: +1.9 m/s)	Nicholas Murchie / North Queensland	6.89m w (wind: +3.0 m/s)
Long jump Open (Grand Prix Series)	Julius Nymbane / North Queensland	7.46m	Rodney Blair; Jump Start Australia	6.99m	Eroni Tuivanuavou; Fiji	6.82m
Triple jump^{3.)}	Eugene Vollmer; Fiji	14.66m (wind: +1.5 m/s) CR	Mong Taval; Papua New Guinea	13.91m (wind: +0.6 m/s)		
Triple jump Open (Grand Prix Series)	Eugene Vollmer; Fiji	14.35m w (wind: +2.2 m/s)	Mong Taval; Papua New Guinea	13.82m w (wind: +3.0 m/s)	Buraieta Yeeting; Kiribati	13.48m w (wind: +2.3 m/s)
Shot put^{4.)}	Travis Ambrum / North Queensland	12.38m	Luke Devenish; Australia	11.50m	Hamish Nelson; Australia	10.44m
Shot put Open (Grand Prix Series)	Travis Ambrum / North Queensland	12.89m	Luke Poli / North Queensland	12.58m	Raymond Abdy / North Queensland	9.31m
Discus throw^{5.)}	Luke Poli / North Queensland	44.79m CR	Brendan Peeters; Jump Start Australia	37.64m		
Hammer throw	Robert Grimaldi; New Caledonia	36.90m	Geoffrey Gardner; Norfolk Island	33.12m	Barry Mullins / North Queensland	28.49m
Javelin throw^{6.)}	Drew Potts / North Queensland	54.43m	Sam Giatrakos; Australia	44.87m	Ben Rickards; Australia	38.64m
Javelin throw Open (Grand Prix Series)	Stuart Farquhar; New Zealand	77.65m	Leonard Tonhoueri; New Caledonia	52.91m	Dexter Dillay; Northern Mariana Islands	47.26m
4 x 100 metres relay	Papua New Guinea; Jorim Emmanuel; Wally Karika; Henry Ben; Peter Pulu	41.52	Fiji; Timoci Momolevu; Iowane Dovumatua; William McGoon; Filipo Delai	41.77	Solomon Islands; Nelson Kabitana; Jack Iroga; Adison Alfred; Chris Walasi	42.75
4 x 400 metres relay	Fiji; Iliesa Namosimalua; Isireli Naikelekelevesi; William McGoon; Niko Verekauta	3:16.23 CR	Papua New Guinea; Nelson Stone; Levi Albert; Waname Egora; Fabian Niulai	3:18.38	Vanuatu; Arnold Sorina; Kepsin Abraham; Jimmy Kassiley; Sam Kaiapam	3:24.36

^{1.)}: The 800 metres event was won by Aunese Curreen from Samoa in 1:50.59 running as a guest.
^{2.)}: The 1500 metres event was won by Aunese Curreen from Samoa in 3:56.11 running as a guest.
^{3.)}: In the triple jump event, Buraieta Yeeting from Kiribati was 3rd in 13.36m (wind: +0.6 m/s) competing as a guest.
^{4.)}: The shot put event was won by Salesi Ahokovi from Tonga in 12.55m competing as a guest.
^{5.)}: In the discus throw event, Travis Ambrum from / North Queensland was 2nd in 42.30m competing as a guest.
^{6.)}: The javelin throw event was won by Stuart Farquhar from New Zealand in 77.58m, Dexter Dillay from the Northern Mariana Islands was 3rd in 45.37m, both competing as guests.

=== Women ===
Event	Gold		Silver		Bronze	
100 metres (wind: -1.8 m/s)	Mae Koime; Papua New Guinea	11.91	Toea Wisil; Papua New Guinea	12.05	Raphaela Baki; Papua New Guinea	12.31
100 metres (wind: -1.3 m/s) Open B (Grand Prix Series)	Sally McLellan; Australia	11.76	Ana Smythe; New Zealand	12.12	Eunice Steven; Papua New Guinea	13.08
200 metres (wind: +0.4 m/s)	Makelesi Bulikiobo; Fiji	23.36 CR	Mae Koime; Papua New Guinea	24.08	Toea Wisil; Papua New Guinea	24.23
200 metres (wind: +0.4 m/s) Open B (Grand Prix Series)	Ana Smythe; New Zealand	24.07	Melissa Johnson / North Queensland	26.10	Elis Lapenmal; Vanuatu	26.51
400 metres^{7.)}	Makelesi Bulikiobo; Fiji	53.66 CR	Paulini Korowaqa; Fiji	58.48	Torika Odro; Fiji	59.14
800 metres	Salome Dell; Papua New Guinea	2:14.67 CR	Ann Mooney; Papua New Guinea	2:15.29	Cecilia Kumalalamene; Papua New Guinea	2:17.26
1500 metres	Salome Dell; Papua New Guinea	4:50.39 CR	Cecilia Kumalalamene; Papua New Guinea	4:56.38	Poro Gahekave; Papua New Guinea	5:00.29
5000 metres	Poro Gahekave; Papua New Guinea	18:58.10 CR	Florence Tina; Solomon Islands	20:52.20		
10000 metres	Florence Tina; Solomon Islands	47:52.22				
100 metres hurdles (wind: -0.7 m/s)	Rebecca Robinson; Australia	16.02				
400 metres hurdles^{8.)}	Sharon Henry; Papua New Guinea	63.24 CR	Shannon McCann; Jump Start Australia	65.55	Heidi Van Lint / North Queensland	74.84
3000 metres steeplechase	Poro Gahekave; Papua New Guinea	11:54.71				
High jump	Ashleigh Reid; Australia	1.70m CR	Tara Whitehead / North Queensland	1.65m	Nellie Leslie; Papua New Guinea	1.60m
High jump Open (Grand Prix Series)	Tara Whitehead / North Queensland	1.66m	Emma Fletcher / North Queensland	1.60m	Delilah Kami; Papua New Guinea	1.55m
Long jump	Soko Salaniqiqi; Fiji	5.78m w (wind: +2.8 m/s)	Makelesi Tumalevu; Fiji	5.66m w (wind: +2.6 m/s)	Tara Whitehead / North Queensland	5.54m w (wind: +2.3 m/s)
Long jump Open (Grand Prix Series)	Soko Salaniqiqi; Fiji	5.84m (wind: NWI)	Katie Cox / North Queensland	5.52m (wind: NWI)	Makelesi Tumalevu; Fiji	5.50m (wind: NWI)
Triple jump	Tara Whitehead / North Queensland	11.80m (wind: +0.5 m/s) CR	Soko Salaniqiqi; Fiji	11.72m w (wind: +2.1 m/s)	Adriana Myrteza / North Queensland	10.52m (wind: +1.3 m/s)
Triple jump Open (Grand Prix Series)	Tara Whitehead / North Queensland	12.02m w (wind: +2.7 m/s)	Soko Salaniqiqi; Fiji	11.52m (wind: +1.1 m/s)	Adriana Myrteza / North Queensland	10.39m (wind: +0.9 m/s)
Shot put^{9.)}	Brittany Knee; Australia	10.77m CR	Rebecca Robinson; Australia	10.56m		
Shot put Open (Grand Prix Series)	Valerie Vili; New Zealand	19.06m	Ana Po'uhila; Tonga	16.87m	Cheryl LeBrun / North Queensland	4.34m
Discus throw^{10.)}	Rebecca Robinson; Australia	34.12m CR				
Discus throw Open (Grand Prix Series)	Beatrice Faumuina; New Zealand	58.08m	Rebecca Robinson; Australia	35.96m	Cheryl LeBrun / North Queensland	14.24m
Hammer throw^{11.)}	Suzy Vercoe; Norfolk Island	34.44m	Brittany Knee; Australia	26.67m		
Javelin throw^{12.)}	Sisilia Lau; Fiji	39.31m	Rebecca Robinson; Australia	33.66m		
Javelin throw Open (Grand Prix Series)	Serafina Akeli; Samoa	48.33m	Sisilia Lau; Fiji	42.38m	Cheryl LeBrun / North Queensland	10.51m
4 x 100 metres relay^{13.)}	Papua New Guinea; Eunice Steven; Jacinta Langa; Cecilia Kumalalamene; Raphaela Baki	48.68	Solomon Islands; Lisa Flory; Pauline Kwalea; Jenny Keni; Joycelyn Taurikeni	52.07		
4 x 400 metres relay	Papua New Guinea; Ann Mooney; Sharon Henry; Eunice Steven; Toea Wisil	3:54.12 CR	Fiji; Sera Mereula; Paulini Korowaqa; Alena Vadrasamu; Torika Odro	3:58.96	/ North Queensland; Jacqueline Stresing; Heidi Van Lint; Megan McCaul; Melissa Johnson	4:11.98

^{7.)}: In the 400 metres event, Toea Wisil from Papua New Guinea was 2nd in 55.66 running as a guest.
^{8.)}: The 400 metres hurdles event was won by Jacqueline Stresing from / North Queensland in 63.17 running as a guest.
^{9.)}: The shot put event was won by Valerie Vili from New Zealand in 20.03m, Ana Po'uhila from Tonga was 2nd in 16.49m, both competing as guests.
^{10.)}: In the discus throw event, Cheryl LeBrun from / North Queensland was 2nd in 13.63m competing as a guest.
^{11.)}: The hammer throw event was won by Ana Po'uhila from Tonga in 41.11m, Serafina Akeli from Samoa was 3rd in 29.55m, both competing as guests.
^{12.)}: The javelin throw event was won by Serafina Akeli from Samoa in 49.63m competing as a guest.
^{13.)}: In the 4x100 metres relay event, a team from Australia (Brittany Knee, Sarah Mackaway, Ashleigh Reid, Rebecca Robinson) was 2nd in 50.26 running as guests.

=== Mixed ===
Event	Gold		Silver		Bronze	
Discus throw Mixed Open	Beatrice Faumuina; New Zealand	57.69m	Ana Po'uhila; Tonga	46.76m	Travis Ambrum / North Queensland	41.83m

== Medal table (unofficial) ==
* Host nation ( North Queensland)

Rank	Nation	Gold	Silver	Bronze	Total
1	Fiji (FIJ)	12	8	1	21
2	Papua New Guinea (PNG)	12	7	9	28
3	Australia (AUS)	4	8	4	16
4	North Queensland*	4	1	6	11
5	Jump Start Australia	2	2	0	4
6	Solomon Islands (SOL)	1	4	5	10
7	Vanuatu (VAN)	1	3	2	6
8	Norfolk Island (NFK)	1	1	0	2
9	New Caledonia (NCL)	1	0	0	1
Totals (9 entries)		38	34	27	99

== Participation ==
The participation of athletes from 7 countries and 6 guest countries from Oceania was reported. In addition, two local teams comprising athletes from the organizing Athletics North Queensland (ANQ) (representing North Queensland) and from the Athletics Australia's Jump Start program for indigenous athletes ("Jump Start Australia") competed.

- Australia
- Fiji
- Jump Start Australia
- New Caledonia
- Norfolk Island
- / North Queensland
- Papua New Guinea
- Solomon Islands
- Vanuatu

Guest countries from Micronesia and Polynesia:

- Kiribati
- Nauru
- New Zealand
- Northern Mariana Islands
- Samoa
- Tonga
