= Athletics at the 2013 Pacific Mini Games =

Athletics at the IX Pacific Mini Games
- Dates: September 3–6
- Host city: Mata Utu, Wallis and Futuna
- Venue: Kafika Stadium
- Level: Senior
- Events: 47 (25 men, 22 women)

Athletics, for the 2013 Pacific Mini Games, was held at Kafika Stadium in Mata Utu, Wallis and Futuna, from 3 to 6 September 2013. There were four parasport events included, three for men and one for women.

== Medal table ==
Key:

* Host nation (Wallis and Futuna)

| Rank | Nation | Gold | Silver | Bronze | Total |
|---|---|---|---|---|---|
| 1 | New Caledonia (NCL) | 18 | 7 | 5 | 30 |
| 2 | Papua New Guinea (PNG) | 14 | 11 | 10 | 35 |
| 3 | Fiji (FIJ) | 8 | 9 | 10 | 27 |
| 4 | Tonga (TON) | 2 | 3 | 4 | 9 |
| 5 | Wallis and Futuna (WLF)* | 1 | 5 | 4 | 10 |
| 6 | Solomon Islands (SOL) | 1 | 4 | 1 | 6 |
| 7 | French Polynesia (TAH) | 1 | 2 | 2 | 5 |
| 8 | Cook Islands (COK) | 1 | 2 | 0 | 3 |
| 9 | Samoa (SAM) | 1 | 0 | 2 | 3 |
| 10 | Nauru (NRU) | 0 | 0 | 1 | 1 |
| 10 | Norfolk Island (NFK) | 0 | 0 | 1 | 1 |
| 10 | Palau (PLW) | 0 | 0 | 1 | 1 |
| 10 | Vanuatu (VAN) | 0 | 0 | 1 | 1 |
| Totals (13 entries) | | 47 | 43 | 42 | 132 |

== Medal summary ==
Placings where no medal was awarded are highlighted in sky blue

=== Men ===
| Event | Gold | | Silver | | Bronze | |
|---|---|---|---|---|---|---|
| 100 metres | Ratu Tabakaucoro; Fiji | 10.33 GR | Kupun Wisil; Papua New Guinea | 10.60 | Francis Kirikirikula; Fiji | 10.71 |
| 100 metres parasport | Sylvain Bova; New Caledonia | 12.58 | Clement Gibus; New Caledonia | 13.49 | Luther Solomone; Fiji | 14.13 |
| 200 metres | Ratu Tabakaucoro; Fiji | 21.13 GR | Joe Matmat; Papua New Guinea | 22.00 | Rodman Teltull; Palau | 22.07 |
| 400 metres | Siologa Sepa; Samoa | 48.67 | Heamatangi Tuivai; Tonga | 48.71 | Batinisavu Uluiyata; Fiji | 49.05 |
| 800 metres | Adrien Kela; New Caledonia | 1:53.65 | Epeli Batisila; Fiji | 1:54.77 | Kaminiel Matlaun; Papua New Guinea | 1:58.32 |
| 1,500 metres | Adrien Kela; New Caledonia | 4:11.90 | Inia Sili; Fiji | 4:12.89 | Andipas Georasi; Papua New Guinea | 4:12.91 |
| 5,000 metres | Nordine Benfodda; New Caledonia | 16:06.53 | Rosfelo Siosi; Solomon Islands | 16:14.81 | Ashneel Nand; Fiji | 16:22.32 |
| 10,000 metres | Nordine Benfodda; New Caledonia | 34:42.22 | Rosfelo Siosi; Solomon Islands | 35:17.85 | Simbai Kaspar; Papua New Guinea | 38:12.88 |
| Half-marathon | Nordine Benfodda; New Caledonia | 1:17:09 | Sapolai Yao; Papua New Guinea | 1:17:33 | Rosfelo Siosi; Solomon Islands | 1:21:28 |
| 110 metres hurdles | Mowen Boino; Papua New Guinea | 14.58 | Toriki Uraruru; Tahiti | 14.61 | Tutaia Galoiola; Samoa | 15.33 |
| 400 metres hurdles | Mowen Boino; Papua New Guinea | 53.34 | Heamatangi Tuivai; Tonga | 54.58 | Raymod Koniel; Papua New Guinea | 56.39 |
| 3,000 metres steeplechase | Skene Kiage; Papua New Guinea | 9:56.06 | Sapolai Yao; Papua New Guinea | 9:57.35 | Inia Sili; Fiji | 10:18.06 |
| 4×100 metres relay | Papua New Guinea | 41.76 | New Caledonia | 42.56 | Tonga | 42.59 |
| 4×400 metres relay | Fiji | 3:15.18 | Papua New Guinea | 3:16.19 | Samoa | 3:24.84 |
| High jump | Isikeli Waga; Fiji | 1.98 m | David Jessem; Papua New Guinea | 1.96 m | Christopher Makatuki; New Caledonia | 1.87 m |
| Pole vault | Robin Hilaire; Tahiti | 3.60 m | Not awarded | | Not awarded | |
| Long jump | Frédéric Erin; New Caledonia | 7.29 m | Waisake Fausoko; Fiji | 7.17 m | Simione Isimeli; Fiji | 6.98 m |
| Triple jump | Frédéric Erin; New Caledonia | 14.56 m | Eugene Vollmer; Fiji | 14.28 m | Nog Tavol; Papua New Guinea | 14.15 m |
| Shot put | Erwan Cassier; New Caledonia | 15.24 m | Loïc Tuaira; Tahiti | 14.62 m | Aukusitino Hoatau; Wallis and Futuna | 13.86 m |
| Seated shot put | Thierry Cibone; New Caledonia | 12.10 m | Not awarded | | Not awarded | |
| Discus throw | Erwan Cassier; New Caledonia | 45.23 m | Akusitino Hoatau; Wallis and Futuna | 44.16 m | Loïc Tuaira; Tahiti | 42.12 m |
| Hammer throw | Erwan Cassier; New Caledonia | 60.41 m | Eutesio Toto; New Caledonia | 50.66 m | Aukusitino Hoatau; Wallis and Futuna | 36.15 m |
| Javelin throw | Leslie Copeland; Fiji | 68.62 m | Vahaafenua Tipotio; Wallis and Futuna | 66.79 m | Valentine Tuhimutu; Wallis and Futuna | 65.21 m |
| Javelin throw parasport | Tony Falelavaki; Wallis and Futuna | | Osiasi Falelavaki; Wallis and Futuna | | Yves Mavaetau; Wallis and Futuna | |
| Decathlon | Toutouofa Vea; Tonga | 5293 | Unai Bustill; Wallis and Futuna | 5191 | Lars Fa'apoi; Tonga | 4973 |

=== Women ===
| Event | Gold | | Silver | | Bronze | |
|---|---|---|---|---|---|---|
| 100 metres | Toea Wisil; Papua New Guinea | 11.68 | Younis Bese; Fiji | 12.21 | Lovelite Detenamo; Nauru | 12.22 |
| 200 metres | Toea Wisil; Papua New Guinea | 24.12 | Patricia Taea; Cook Islands | 25.13 | Elenoa Sailosi; Fiji | 25.22 |
| 400 metres | Betty Burua; Papua New Guinea | 56.96 | Toea Wisil; Papua New Guinea | 57.58 | Shirley Vunatup; Papua New Guinea | 58.50 |
| 800 metres | Jenny Albert; Papua New Guinea | 2:19.84 | Tuna Tine; Papua New Guinea | 2:21.03 | Poro Gahekave; Papua New Guinea | 2:21.12 |
| 1,500 metres | Poro Gahekave; Papua New Guinea | 4:55.91 | Jenny Albert; Papua New Guinea | 4:55.98 | Solenne Kerleguer; New Caledonia | 5:01.55 |
| 5,000 metres | Anne Beaufils; New Caledonia | 19:34.80 | Sharon Firisua; Solomon Islands | 19:47.62 | Monica Miugle; Papua New Guinea | 20:48.29 |
| 10,000 metres | Anne Beaufils; New Caledonia | 44:11.93 | Not awarded | | Not awarded | |
| Half-marathon | Sharon Firisua; Solomon Islands | 1:38:04 | Anne Beaufils; New Caledonia | 1:38:22 | Elodie Mevel; Tahiti | 1:38:24 |
| 100 metres hurdles | Manuella Gavin; New Caledonia | 14.95 | Helen Philemon; Papua New Guinea | 15.85 | Ana Katil; Tonga | 16.47 |
| 400 metres hurdles | Betty Burua; Papua New Guinea | 1:01.37 | Donna Koniel; Papua New Guinea | 1:01.37 | Not awarded | |
| 3,000 metres steeplechase | Poro Gahekave; Papua New Guinea | 12:13.22 | Sharon Firisua; Solomon Islands | 12:40.57 | Maryanna Peter; Papua New Guinea | 12:59.68 |
| 4×100 metres relay | Papua New Guinea | 46.75 | Fiji | 47.34 | Vanuatu | 50.32 |
| 4×400 metres relay | Papua New Guinea | 3:52.85 | Fiji | 3:57.19 | Tonga | 4:08.52 |
| High jump | Diama Maramanikaibau; Fiji | 1.63 m | Shirley Fuller; New Caledonia | 1.57 m | Manuella Gavin; New Caledonia | 1.50 m |
| Long jump | Makelesi Tumalevu; Fiji | 5.48 m | Milika Tuivanuavou; Fiji | 5.43 m | Manuella Gavin; New Caledonia | 5.25 m |
| Triple jump | Betty Burua; Papua New Guinea | 11.95 m | Milika Tuivanuavou; Fiji | 11.90 m | Makelesi Tumalevu; Fiji | 11.29 m |
| Shot put | Tereapii Tapoki; Cook Islands | 14.46 m | Milika Tuivanuavou; Fiji | 14.29 m | Losa Fakate; New Caledonia | 13.60 m |
| Seated shot put | Rose Welepa; New Caledonia | 9.96 m | Not awarded | | Not awarded | |
| Discus throw | Tereapi'i Tapoki; Cook Islands | 48.48 m | Losa Fakate; New Caledonia | 44.20 m | Milika Tuivanuavou; Fiji | 43.11 m |
| Hammer throw | Elise Takosi; New Caledonia | 53.63 m | Losa Fakate; New Caledonia | 46.72 m | Brianna Stephens; Norfolk Island | 39.08 m |
| Javelin throw | Linda Selui; New Caledonia | 46.61 m | Emilie Falelavaki; Wallis and Futuna | 46.36 m | Milika Tuivanuavou; Fiji | 42.58 m |
| Heptathlon | Mafikovi Akanete; Tonga | 3877 | Olivia Eteaki; Tonga | 3140 | Eunice Steven; Papua New Guinea | 3028 |

== See also ==
- Athletics at the Pacific Games
