= 2009 Melanesian Championships in Athletics =

V Melanesian Championships in Athletics
- Dates: August 4–8
- Host city: Gold Coast, Queensland, Australia
- Venue: Griffith University
- Level: Senior
- Events: 34 (18 men, 16 women)
- Participation: 85 athletes from 7 nations

The 2009 Melanesian Championships in Athletics took place between August 4–8, 2009. The event was held at the Griffith University in Gold Coast, Queensland, Australia, jointly with the OAA Grand Prix Series, and the OAA sub-regional Micronesian and Polynesian Championships. Many athletes utilised the competitions preparing for the upcoming IAAF World Championships in Berlin, Germany. Detailed reports were given for the OAA.

A total of 34 events were contested, 18 by men and 16 by women.

== Medal summary ==
Complete results can be found on the Oceania Athletics Association webpage, and at sportfieber.pytalhost.com.

In 100 metres, 400 metres hurdles, long jump and triple jump, as well as in shot put, discus throw, and javelin throw, there were separate open competitions for the Melanesian championships and the OAA Grand Prix Series held on different days.

=== Men ===
| Event | Gold | | Silver | | Bronze | |
|---|---|---|---|---|---|---|
| 100 metres (wind: +0.1 m/s) | Niko Verekauta; Fiji | 10.60 | Nelson Stone; Papua New Guinea | 10.76 | Iowane Dovumatua; Fiji | 10.82 |
| 100 metres Non-Championship Event (Grand Prix Series) | Adison Alfred; Solomon Islands | 11.21 (wind: +0.0 m/s) | Mathew Goha; Solomon Islands | 11.30 (wind: +1.2 m/s) | Jack Iroga; Solomon Islands | 11.37 (wind: +1.2 m/s) |
| 200 metres (wind: +2.5 m/s) | Niko Verekauta; Fiji | 21.47 w | Nelson Stone; Papua New Guinea | 21.59 w | Tevita Nalovo Tuvuloka; Fiji | 22.17 w |
| 400 metres^{1.)} | Nelson Stone; Papua New Guinea | 47.61 | Wala Gime; Papua New Guinea | 48.38 | Joshua Ahwong; Australia | 48.77 |
| 800 metres | Varasiko Toge Tomeru; Fiji | 1:55.21 | Adrien Kela; New Caledonia | 1:55.58 | Dean Searles; Australia | 1:55.62 |
| 1500 metres | Adrien Kela; New Caledonia | 4:08.57 | Rorey Hunter; Australia | 4:09.19 | Douglas Bale; Solomon Islands | 4:17.28 |
| 5000 metres | Philip Nausien; Vanuatu | 16:08.60 | Nathan Sutherland; Australia | 16:34.26 | Theo Houdret; New Caledonia | 17:30.16 |
| 10000 metres | Chris Votu; Solomon Islands | 34:08.25 | Philip Nausien; Vanuatu | 35:43.02 | Nicholas Hanna; Australia | 42:11.04 |
| 3000 metres steeplechase | Chris Votu; Solomon Islands | 10:17.84 | Douglas Bale; Solomon Islands | 10:24.15 | | |
| 110 metres hurdles (wind: -0.1 m/s) | Xavier Fenuafanote; New Caledonia | 15.79 | Jone Wainiqolo; Fiji | 15.82 | Nathan McConchie; Australia | 18.04 |
| 400 metres hurdles | Wala Gime; Papua New Guinea | 53.12 | | | | |
| 400 metres hurdles Non-Championship Event (Grand Prix Series) | Wala Gime; Papua New Guinea | 52.45 | Jone Wainiqolo; Fiji | 56.06 | | |
| High jump | Norman Tse; Papua New Guinea | 1.96m | Xavier Fenuafanote; New Caledonia | 1.87m | Khaele Bowen; Australia | 1.81m |
| Long jump | Julius Nyambane; Australia | 7.01m (wind: +1.1 m/s) | Rodney Blaire; Australia | 6.71m (wind: -1.5 m/s) | Norman Tse; Papua New Guinea | 6.69m (wind: +1.9 m/s) |
| Long jump Non-Championship Event (Grand Prix Series) | Julius Nyambane; Australia | 6.90m (wind: -0.4 m/s) | Norman Tse; Papua New Guinea | 6.69m (wind: +0.7 m/s) | Rodney Blaire; Australia | 6.39m (wind: +0.9 m/s) |
| Triple jump | Mong Tavol; Papua New Guinea | 13.91m (wind: -1.0 m/s) | Reginald Monagi; Papua New Guinea | 13.24m (wind: +0.0 m/s) | Etuwate Dreli; Fiji | 12.98m (wind: -2.1 m/s) |
| Triple jump Non-Championship Event (Grand Prix Series) | Mong Tavol; Papua New Guinea | 13.98m (wind: -1.1 m/s) | Reginald Monagi; Papua New Guinea | 13.64m (wind: -0.2 m/s) | | |
| Shot put | David Rakoci; Australia | 11.11m | | | | |
| Discus throw Non-Championship Event (Grand Prix Series) | David Rakoci; Australia | 34.61m | | | | |
| Hammer throw | Thomas McGuire; Australia | 43.25m | David Rakoci; Australia | 32.59m | | |
| Javelin throw | Leslie Copeland; Fiji | 67.99m CR | Ashley Hollins; Australia | 61.12m | Semi Waqavatu; Fiji | 55.13m |
| Javelin throw Non-Championship Event (Grand Prix Series) | Leslie Copeland; Fiji | 66.36m | Ashley Hollins; Australia | 64.23m | | |
| 4 x 100 metres relay^{2.)} | Fiji | 41.40 =CR | Papua New Guinea | 41.90 | Australia | 44.33 |
| 4 x 400 metres relay | Papua New Guinea | 3:23.07 | Vanuatu | 3:30.73 | Australia | 3:34.31 |

^{1.)}: In the 400 metres event, Kevin Kapmatana from Papua New Guinea was 2nd in 48.05 competing as a guest.
^{2.)}: In the 4 x 100 metres relay event, the B team from Fiji was 3rd in 42.30 competing as guests.

=== Women ===
| Event | Gold | | Silver | | Bronze | |
|---|---|---|---|---|---|---|
| 100 metres (wind: -1.0 m/s) | Toea Wisil; Papua New Guinea | 11.80 =CR | Makelesi Bulikiobo; Fiji | 11.98 | Helen Philemon; Papua New Guinea | 13.07 |
| 100 metres (wind: +1.0 m/s)] Non-Championship Event (Grand Prix Series) | Michele John; Papua New Guinea | 13.52 | Pauline Kwalea; Solomon Islands | 13.63 | | |
| 200 metres (wind: 1.6 m/s) | Makelesi Bulikiobo; Fiji | 24.25 | Toea Wisil; Papua New Guinea | 24.64 | Paulini Korowaqa; Fiji | 25.65 |
| 400 metres^{1.)} | Makelesi Bulikiobo; Fiji | 54.90 | Salome Dell; Papua New Guinea | 55.79 | Paulini Korowaqa; Fiji | 58.36 |
| 800 metres | Salome Dell; Papua New Guinea | 2:09.25 CR | Kavita Maharaj; Fiji | 2:21.23 | Poro Gahekave; Papua New Guinea | 2:26.37 |
| 1500 metres | Kavita Maharaj; Fiji | 4:57.81 | Poro Gahekave; Papua New Guinea | 5:08.60 | Salote Nauila; Fiji | 5:20.75 |
| 5000 metres | Sereima Liku; Fiji | 20:24.28 | | | | |
| 100 metres hurdles (wind: -0.3 m/s) | Soko Salaniqiqi; Fiji | 15.66 CR | | | | |
| 400 metres hurdles | Sharon Kwarula; Papua New Guinea | 64.38 | | | | |
| Long jump | Soko Salaniqiqi; Fiji | 5.71m w (wind: +4.9 m/s) | Merrisa Colledge; Australia | 5.50m w (wind: +2.8 m/s) | | |
| Long jump Non-Championship Event (Grand Prix Series) | Merrisa Colledge; Australia | 5.17m (wind: +0.8 m/s) | Soko Salaniqiqi; Fiji | 5.17m (wind: +1.3 m/s) | | |
| Triple jump | Nickeisha Hodder; Australia | 10.20m (wind: +0.5 m/s) | | | | |
| Shot put | Kelly Humphries; Australia | 11.19m CR | Nickeisha Hodder; Australia | 9.63m | Britt Quintal Christian; Norfolk Island | 8.91m |
| Shot put Non-Championship Event (Grand Prix Series) | Kelly Humphries; Australia | 11.09m | Che Kenneally; Australia | 10.47m | Britt Quintal Christian; Norfolk Island | 8.81m |
| Discus throw^{2.)} | Kelly Humphries; Australia | 38.23m CR | Wasie Toolis; Australia | 32.34m | Nickeisha Hodder; Australia | 32.01m |
| Discus throw Non-Championship Event (Grand Prix Series) | Kelly Humphries; Australia | 36.17m | Nickeisha Hodder; Australia | 35.40m | Wasie Toolis; Australia | 31.18m |
| Hammer throw | Kelly Humphries; Australia | 44.22m CR | Cindy Toluafe; New Caledonia | 41.28m | | |
| Javelin throw | Nickeisha Hodder; Australia | 40.99m | Wasie Toolis; Australia | 39.02m | | |
| Javelin throw Non-Championship Event (Grand Prix Series) | Nickeisha Hodder; Australia | 41.45m | Wasie Toolis; Australia | 37.09m | Kelly Humphries; Australia | 29.26m |
| 4 x 100 metres relay | Papua New Guinea | 49.08 | Australia | 51.92 | | |
| 4 x 400 metres relay | Papua New Guinea | 4:00.20 | Fiji | 4:02.28 | | |

^{1.)}: In the 400 metres event, Angeline Blackburn from Australia was 3rd in 55.85 competing as a guest.
^{2.)}: In the discus throw event, Che Kenneally from Australia was 2nd in 35.71m competing as a guest.

== Medal table (unofficial) ==
* Host nation (Australia)

| Rank | Nation | Gold | Silver | Bronze | Total |
|---|---|---|---|---|---|
| 1 | Fiji (FIJ) | 11 | 4 | 7 | 22 |
| 2 | Papua New Guinea (PNG) | 10 | 8 | 3 | 21 |
| 3 | Australia (AUS)* | 8 | 10 | 8 | 26 |
| 4 | New Caledonia (NCL) | 2 | 3 | 1 | 6 |
| 5 | Solomon Islands (SOL) | 2 | 1 | 1 | 4 |
| 6 | Vanuatu (VAN) | 1 | 2 | 0 | 3 |
| 7 | Norfolk Island (NFK) | 0 | 0 | 1 | 1 |
| Totals (7 entries) | | 34 | 28 | 21 | 83 |

== Participation ==
According to an unofficial count, 85 athletes from 7 countries participated.

- Australia (24)
- Fiji (19)
- New Caledonia (5)
- Norfolk Island (1)
- Papua New Guinea (21)
- Solomon Islands (6)
- Vanuatu (9)
