= Athletics at the 2009 Pacific Mini Games =

Athletics at the VIII Pacific Mini Games
- Dates: September 22–26
- Host city: Rarotonga, Cook Islands
- Venue: Bank of the Cook Islands National Stadium
- Level: Senior
- Events: 41 (21 men, 20 women)
- Participation: 175 athletes from 16 nations

Athletics competitions at the 2009 Pacific Mini Games were held at the Bank of the Cook Islands National Stadium in Rarotonga, Cook Islands, between September 22–26, 2009.

A total of 41 events were contested, 21 by men and 20 by women.

== Medal summary ==
Medal winners and their results were published on the Oceania Athletics Association webpage by Bob Snow.

Complete results can also be found on the Oceania Athletics Association, and on the Cook Islands Sports and National Olympic Committee webpages.

Placings where no medal was awarded are highlighted in sky blue^{a}

=== Men ===
Event	Gold		Silver		Bronze	
100 metres (wind: +1.9 m/s)	Niko Verekauta (FIJ)	10.59	Ratu Banuve Tabakaucoro (FIJ)	10.68	Lagaua Isaac Patuavalu (NIU)	10.75
200 metres (wind: -0.4 m/s)	Niko Verekauta (FIJ)	21.33	Ratu Banuve Tabakaucoro (FIJ)	21.70	Tevita Tuvuloka Nalovo (FIJ)	22.16
400 metres	Niko Verekauta (FIJ)	48.83	Jocelyn Muntaner (PYF)	49.68	Osea Dasalusalu (FIJ)	49.92
800 metres	Varasiko Toge Tomeru (FIJ)	1:55.60	Arnold Sorina (VAN)	1:56.39	Iulio Lafai (SAM)	1:59.14
1500 metres	/Cedric Oblet (NCL)	4:11.17	Arnold Sorina (VAN)	4:15.11	Varasiko Toge Tomeru (FIJ)	4:15.62
5000 metres	/Cedric Oblet (NCL)	15:53.92	Georges Richmond (PYF)	16:07.22	Francky Maraetaata (PYF)	16:25.65
10000 metres	Chris Votu (SOL)	33:07.83	Georges Richmond (PYF)	33:27.84	/Cedric Oblet (NCL)	33:35.56
Half Marathon	Georges Richmond (PYF)	1:14:01.52	Francky Maraetaata (PYF)	1:14:55.73	Chris Votu (SOL)	1:15:38.13
3000 metres steeplechase	Chris Votu (SOL)	10:07.43	Tupuhoe Tahi (PYF)	10:14.35	Pierre Bourret (PYF)^{a}	10:14.80
110 metres hurdles (wind: +0.6 m/s)	Inoke Finau (TGA)	15.27	Jone Wainiqolo (FIJ)	15.31	/Xavier Fenuafanote (NCL)	15.36
400 metres hurdles	Jone Wainiqolo (FIJ)	55.12	Heamatangi Tuivai (TGA)	57.33	Jocelyn Muntaner (PYF)	57.64
High jump	/Yorick Metzdorf (NCL)	1.95m	Raihau Maiau (PYF)	1.92m	Esau Vakameilalo (TGA)	1.89m
Long jump	/Frédéric Erin (NCL)	7.73m (wind: +0.0 m/s)	Raihau Maiau (PYF)	7.45m (wind: +1.4 m/s)	Ernest Petueli (FIJ)	6.84m (wind: +0.4 m/s)
Triple jump	/Frédéric Erin (NCL)	16.03m (wind: +0.0 m/s)	/Kainric Ozoux (NCL)	14.10m (wind: +0.2 m/s)	Raihau Maiau (PYF)	13.69m (wind: +0.9 m/s)
Shot put	/Daniel Kilama (NCL)	16.17m	Shaka Sola (SAM)	16.16m	Mau George (COK)	13.85m
Discus throw	/Daniel Kilama (NCL)	46.57m	Maitoa Rooarii Pito (PYF)	46.46m	/Erwan Cassier (NCL)	45.68m
Hammer throw	/Erwan Cassier (NCL)	56.35m	/Petelo Toto (NCL)	50.74m	Brentt Jones (NFK)	47.33m
Javelin throw	Leslie Copeland (FIJ)	74.92m	/Mathieu Roulet (NCL)	63.32m	(Wallis and Futuna) /Sosefo Panuve (WLF)	63.19m
Octathlon	Kolinio Qarau (FIJ)	4719pts	Yoann Barff (PYF)	4138pts	N/A	DNF
4 x 100 metres relay	Fiji	41.20	Tonga	43.35	Niue; Isaac Tatoa; Michael Jackson; Tofua Puletama; Billy Paea	43.97
4 x 400 metres relay	Fiji	3:20.49	Tonga	3:27.64	French Polynesia^{a}	3:36.04

=== Women ===
Event	Gold		Silver		Bronze	
100 metres (wind: +0.1 m/s)	Makelesi Bulikiobo (FIJ)	11.97	Latai Sikuvea (TGA)	12.46	Vasi Feke (TGA)	12.62
200 metres (wind: +0.4 m/s)	Makelesi Bulikiobo (FIJ)	24.52	Paulini Korowaqa (FIJ)	25.07	Anameli Navukitu (FIJ)	25.33
400 metres	Makelesi Bulikiobo (FIJ)	55.71	Paulini Korowaqa (FIJ)	58.02	Makitalena Lokolokobuka (FIJ)	58.89
800 metres	Kavita Maharaj (FIJ)	2:18.40	Astrid Montuclard (PYF)	2:19.82	Salote Naiula (FIJ)	2:20.13
1500 metres	Kavita Maharaj (FIJ)	5:04.43	Salote Naiula (FIJ)	5:05.91	Astrid Montuclard (PYF)	5:05.92
5000 metres	Betty Babalu (SOL)	20:10.29	Sereima Liku (FIJ)	20:10.67	/Anne Beaufils (NCL)	20:20.63
10000 metres	/Josiane Chipeaux (NCL)	41:24.10	Betty Babalu (SOL)	42:08.95	/Anne Beaufils (NCL)^{a}	42:37.81
Half Marathon	/Josiane Chipeaux (NCL)	1:29:24.65	/Anne Beaufils (NCL)	1:36:37.93	Valérie Bechennec (PYF)	1:38:21.26
100 metres hurdles (wind: -0.1 m/s)	Terani Faremiro (PYF)	15.14	Vasi Feke (TGA)	15.21	Johanna Sui (PYF)	15.53
400 metres hurdles	Anameli Navukitu (FIJ)	65.32	Océane LeFranc (PYF)	65.90	Vasi Feke (TGA)	68.12
High jump	Johanna Sui (PYF)	1.62m	Terani Faremiro (PYF)	1.62m	Océane LeFranc (PYF)	1.53m
Long jump	Terani Faremiro (PYF)	5.62m (wind: +1.0 m/s)	Soko Salaniqiqi (FIJ)	5.54m (wind: +0.0 m/s)	Johanna Sui (PYF)	5.51m (wind: +0.1 m/s)
Triple jump	Terani Faremiro (PYF)	11.58m (wind: +1.3 m/s)	Soko Salaniqiqi (FIJ)	11.31m (wind: +1.6 m/s)	Manoa Asenate (TUV)	10.29m (wind: +1.0 m/s) NR
Shot put	Ana Po'uhila (TGA)	16.53m	Margaret Satupai (SAM)	14.52m	Tereapii Tapoki (COK)	13.88m
Discus throw	Ana Po'uhila (TGA)	53.10m	Margaret Satupai (SAM)	50.94m	Tereapii Tapoki (COK)	48.46m
Hammer throw	Ana Po'uhila (TGA)	50.70m	/Elise Takosi (NCL)	49.80m	/Bina Ramesh (NCL)	42.57m
Javelin throw	/Bina Ramesh (NCL)	47.66m	/Astrid Waheo (NCL)	47.48m	Teuruerani Tanepau (PYF)	45.24m
Heptathlon	Soko Salaniqiqi (FIJ)	4745pts	Terano Faremiro (PYF)	4723pts	Johanna Sui (PYF)	4258pts
4 x 100 metres relay	Fiji	47.63	Tonga	48.61	N/A	DSQ
4 x 400 metres relay	Fiji	3:56.05	Tonga^{a}	4:24.50	N/A	N/A

== Medal table (unofficial) ==
* Host nation (Cook Islands)

Rank	Nation	Gold	Silver	Bronze	Total
1	Fiji	18	9	7	34
2	/New Caledonia	11	6	5	22
3	French Polynesia	5	13	10	28
4	Tonga	4	6	3	13
5	Solomon Islands	3	1	1	5
6	Samoa	0	3	1	4
7	Vanuatu	0	2	0	2
8	Cook Islands*	0	0	3	3
9	Niue	0	0	2	2
10	Norfolk Island	0	0	1	1
10	Tuvalu	0	0	1	1
10	Wallis and Futuna	0	0	1	1
Totals (12 entries)		41	40	35	116

== Participation ==
The official start list contains 175 athletes from 17 countries. However, in the result lists, the announced 9 athletes from Guam did not appear, but only athletes from the following 16 countries:

- Cook Islands (21)
- Fiji (31)
- French Polynesia (25)
- Kiribati (7)
- Federated States of Micronesia (2)
- Nauru (5)
- /New Caledonia (18)
- Niue (7)
- Norfolk Island (1)
- Palau (4)
- Samoa (5)
- Solomon Islands (13)
- Tonga (15)
- Tuvalu (5)
- Vanuatu (3)
- /Wallis and Futuna (4)

== Notes ==
^ a Medals were not awarded to place-getters in events where insufficient competitors took part. Five events (Men: 3,000 metre Steeplechase, 4 × 400 metre Relay and Octathlon; Women: 10,000 metre and 4 × 100 metre Relay) had only three competitors, and one event (Women's 4 × 400 metre Relay) had only two competitors. As recorded in the list of medal winners on the official website, those events with three competitors had no bronze medal awarded, and the event with two competitors had no silver or bronze awarded (note also: While the athletes' names on the official website's list of medal winners appear correct, their recorded nationalities are mismatched in some cases. e.g. New Caledonians are listed as from Federated States of Micronesia, Fijians are listed as from Niue).
