= Panuve =

Panuve is a surname. Notable people with the surname include:

- Charissa Panuve (born 1994), Tongan swimmer
- Sosefo Panuve (born 1987), Wallisian athlete
