= Heamatangi Tuivai =

Tongan athlete and rugby player

Personal information
- Born: 11 November 1989 Hihifo, Haʻapai, Tonga

Sport
- Country: Tonga
- Sport: Athletics
Medal record
Men's Athletics
Representing Tonga
Oceania Athletics Championships
Bronze medal – third place	2017 Suva	4x400m relay
Bronze medal – third place	2014 Rarotonga	4x100m relay
Gold medal – first place	2014 Papeete	4x100m relay
Pacific Mini Games
Silver medal – second place	2013 Mata Utu	400m
Silver medal – second place	2013 Mata Utu	400m hurdles
Bronze medal – third place	2013 Mata Utu	4x100m relay
Silver medal – second place	2009 Rarotonga	400m hurdles

Heamatangi Tu'ivai (born 11 November 1989) is a Tongan Athlete and rugby player who has represented Tonga at the Commonwealth Games and Pacific Mini Games.

== Early life and career ==
Tu'ivai is from Hihifo in Haʻapai.

At the 2009 Pacific Mini Games in Rarotonga in won silver in the 400 metres hurdles. At the 2013 Pacific Mini Games in Mata Utu, Wallis and Futuna he won silver in the 400 meters and the 400 meters hurdles, and bronze as part of the 4 × 100 metres relay team. He competed in the 400 meters at the 2014 Commonwealth Games in Glasgow, coming 7th in his heat. At the 2013 Oceania Athletics Championships he won gold as part of the 4 × 100 metres relay team. At the 2014 Oceania Athletics Championships he won bronze as part of the 4 × 100 metres relay team. At the 2017 Oceania Athletics Championships he won bronze as part of the Tongan 4 × 400 metres relay team.

Tu'ivai has also represented Tonga at rugby, as part of the Tonga A national rugby union team at the 2017 World Rugby Americas Pacific Challenge.
