= Dale Stevenson (shot putter) =

Australian shot putter

Personal information
- Born: 1 January 1988 (age 38) Wonthaggi, Victoria
- Height: 1.81 m (5 ft 11 1/2 in)
- Weight: 128 kg (282 lb)

Sport
- Country: Australia
- Sport: Athletics
- Event: Shot put
- Coached by: Gus Puopolo
Medal record
Men's athletics
Representing Australia
Commonwealth Games
Bronze medal – third place	2010 Delhi	Shot put
Oceania Championships
Silver medal – second place	2010 Cairns	Shot put
- Updated on 24 April 2013

Dale Stevenson (born 1 January 1988) is an Australian athlete. He competed for Australia in shot-put at the 2012 Summer Olympics. He is coached by Gus Puopolo.

== Personal life ==
Dale attended the Peninsula School, a Mount Eliza-based primary and secondary school.

== Achievements ==
Year	Competition	Venue	Position	Event	Notes
Representing Papua New Guinea
2010	Oceania Championships	Cairns, Australia	2nd	Shot put	19.41 m
