= Jeremy Roff =

Australian middle-distance runner

Personal information
- Born: 22 November 1983 (age 42) Sydney, New South Wales, Australia

Sport
- Sport: Athletics
Medal record
Men's athletics
Representing Australia
Oceania Championships
Gold medal – first place	2010 Cairns	800 m
Gold medal – first place	2010 Cairns	1500 m
- Updated on 24 April 2013

Jeremy Roff (born 22 November 1983) is an Australian middle-distance runner who specialises in the 1500 metres.

Born in Sydney, New South Wales, he began competing at the elite level in 2003. His first major international event was the 2006 IAAF World Cross Country Championships in Fukuoka, Japan, and he was 58th in the men's short race. At the 2006 Commonwealth Games, he represented Australia in the 1500 m and placed eighth in the final. He was the runner-up of the 1500 m at the 2007 Zatopek Classic, behind Nick Bromley. He was selected for the 2009 World Championships in Athletics but did not make it past the heats. He again took second place at the Zatopek Classic later that year, this time being beaten by Mitch Kealey.

At the Melbourne Track Classic in March 2010, he scored a major upset by beating Asbel Kiprop and Nick Willis, taking the runner-up spot behind Jeff Riseley. Roff took third place at the Australian Athletics Championships in April, earning himself a place on the Australian team for the 2010 Commonwealth Games In the buildup to the competition he scored an 800 metres/1500 m double at the 2010 Oceania Athletics Championships, which included a championship record of 3:41.91 in his preferred event.

== Achievements ==
Year	Competition	Venue	Position	Event	Notes
Representing Australia
2010	Oceania Championships	Cairns, Australia	1st	800 m	1:51.60 min
2010	Oceania Championships	Cairns, Australia	1st	1500 m	3:41.91 min CR
