= Erich Momberger =

Papua New Guinean decathlete

Personal information
- Nationality: Papua New Guinean
- Born: 6 August 1968 (age 57) Port Moresby, Papua New Guinea

Sport
- Sport: Athletics
- Event: Decathlon
Medal record
Men's athletics
Representing Papua New Guinea
Pacific Mini Games
Gold medal – first place	1989 Nuku'alofa	Decathlon

Erich Momberger (born 6 August 1968) is a Papua New Guinean athlete. He competed in the men's decathlon at the 1992 Summer Olympics.

== Career ==
Representing Papua New Guinea, Momberger won the decathlon gold medal at the 1989 South Pacific Mini Games in Nukuʻalofa, Tonga.

Momberger attended college at Oklahoma Christian University where he competed for the Oklahoma Christian Eagles and Lady Eagles track and field team in the National Association of Intercollegiate Athletics beginning in 1990.

He finished 2nd at the 1990 NAIA men's outdoor track and field championship in the decathlon, though he did not compete in the 1991 meet due to illness. While in college competition, Momberger set Papua New Guinean records in the indoor shot put and pole vault of 13.88 m (1991) and 4.11 m (1992) respectively.

In June 1992, Momberger set a decathlon personal best of 7178 points at the Mason-Dixon Games meeting in Maryland. The mark was also a Papua New Guinean national record.

Momberger finished 25th at the Olympics with a score of 6,780 points. En route, he set a pole vault national record of 4.20 metres.

== Personal life ==
Momberger studied engineering at Oklahoma Christian University.
