= 2016 Melanesian Championships in Athletics =

VI Melanesian Championships in Athletics
- Dates: July 7 - 9
- Host city: Suva, Fiji
- Venue: ANZ National Stadium
- Level: Senior
- Participation: 532 athletes from 11 nations

The 2016 Melanesian Championships in Athletics took place on 7–9 July 2016. The event was held at the ANZ National Stadium in Suva, Fiji.

== Medal summary ==
=== Men ===
Event	Gold		Silver		Bronze	
100 metres Senior (wind:+1.2)	Banuve Tabakaucoro; Fiji	10.20 CR, NR	Aaron Stubbs; Australia	10.41	Rodman Teltull; Palau	10.52 NR
100 metres U18 (wind:+1.0)	Wanga Emmanuel; Papua New Guinea	11.20	Nicholas Thomson; Australia	11.21	Keoua Vendegou; New Caledonia	11.26
100 metres Para (wind:+0.6)	Lleyton Lloyd; Australia	12.58	Blake Carr; Australia	13.13	Apimeleki Drole; Fiji	13.53
100 metres U15	Kolonio Radrudru; Fiji		NA	NA	NA	NA
100 metres U11	Ezekiel Singh; Fiji		NA	NA	NA	NA
Mixed 100m Masters (wind: 1.4)	Navitalai Naivalu; Fiji	11.98	Roveen Permal (M78); Fiji	12.48	Pio Qerew Aqa (M76); Fiji	13.37
200 metres(wind:-1.9)	Banuve Tabakaucoro; Fiji	21.12	Tjimarri Sanderson Miller; Australia	21.94	Shane Tuvusa; Fiji	22.22
200 metres U18 (wind:-1.9)	Josefa Tabakaucoro; New Caledonia	22.89	Nicholas Thomson; Australia	22.90	Wanga Emmanuel; Papua New Guinea	22.92
200 metres Under 11	Ezekiel Singh; Fiji	35.54	NA	NA	NA	NA
400 metres	Alexander Carew; Australia	48.37	Theo Piniau; Papua New Guinea	48.54	Tristan Robinson; Australia	48.60
400 metres U18	Wanga Emmanuel; Papua New Guinea	50.66	Dusty Rankin; Australia	51.30	Osea Balenamau; Fiji	52.28
800 metres	Orovo Martin; Papua New Guinea	1:55.90	William Uluara; Solomon Islands	1:57.42	Iliesa Ratete; Fiji	1:57.86
800 metres U18	Lachlan Cowley; Australia	1:57.14	Ben Mander; Australia	1:57.92	Getasew Ferguson; Australia	1:58.53
1500 metres	Orovo Martin; Papua New Guinea	4:07.88	George Lamak; Papua New Guinea	4:07.91	Samson Laos; Vanuatu	4:09.17
3000 metres Under 18	Callum Davies; Australia	8:57.51	Getasew Ferguson; Australia	8:59.08	Tom Weeks; Australia	9:12.87
5000 metres	Liam Woollett; Australia	15:32.18 CR	Avikash Lal; Fiji	15:53.80	Ashneel Nand; Fiji	15:55.68
10000 metres	Avikash Lal; Fiji	34:08.16	Ashneel Nand; Fiji	34:28.65	Rosefelo Siosi; Solomon Islands	34:49.68
Octathlon						
Octathlon Under 18	Ashley Moloney; Australia	5838 pts				
110 metres hurdles (wind:+1.6)	Errol Qaqa; Fiji	15.54	Larry Sulunga; Tonga	15.72	Ulric Buama; New Caledonia	16.22
110 metres hurdles Under 18	Callum Corbett; Australia	14.24	NA	NA	NA	NA
400 metres hurdles	Matt Crowe; Australia	52.70	Ephraim Lerkin; Papua New Guinea	53.41	Peniel Joshua; Papua New Guinea	54.25
400 metres hurdles U18	Matt Walters; Australia	55.87	NA	NA	NA	NA
High jump	Malakai Kaiwalu; Fiji	2.09m CR, =NR	Grant Szalek; Australia	J2.09m	Peniel Richard; Papua New Guinea	1.97m
High jump Under 18	Sean Szalek; Australia	2.03m	Nicholas Hooper; Australia	1.96m	Harry Langley; Australia	1.96m
Long jump	Waisale Dausoko; Fiji	7.40m (wind: 0.0m/s) CR	Isireli Bulivorovoro; Fiji	7.35m (wind: +1.2m/s)	Sam Toleman; Australia	7.22m (wind: +0.9m/s)
Long jump U18	Jack Stolarski; Australia	6.68m (wind: 0.0m/s)	Jethro Lockington; Fiji	6.52m (wind: 1.1m/s)	Abraham Vueti; Fiji	6.45m (wind: 0.0m/s)
Mixed Long Jump Masters	Pio Qerewaqa (M40); Fiji	5.19m	Navitalai Naivalu (M); Fiji	5.51m	Noel Singh (M42); Fiji	3.89m
Triple jump	Peniel Richard; Papua New Guinea	14.86m (wind: -1.0m/s) CR	Belasio Waqadau; Fiji	14.37m (wind: 0.0m/s)	Omar Fall; Fiji	13.85m (wind: -1.4m/s)
Triple jump Under 18	Jack Stolarski; Australia	14.85m	Ashley Moloney; Australia	13.62m	Sailasa Beliyaro; Fiji	12.69m
Shot put	Mustafa Fall; Fiji	15.08m CR	Debono Paraka; Papua New Guinea	14.50m	Darrin Norwood; Australia	14.46m
Shot put Para	Marty Jackson F44; Australia	11.18m	Sam Paech F37; Australia	9.53m	Jone Bogidrau F57; Fiji	8.76m
Shot put Under 18	Alexander Kolesnikoff; Australia	16.55m	Jack Redmond; Australia	16.12m	Liam Gartlan; Australia	15.49m
Discus throw	Mustafa Fall; Fiji	50.28m CR	Debono Paraka; Papua New Guinea	46.59m	Setareki Matau; Fiji	44.58m
Mixed Discus Masters	Albert Miller Snr. (M57); Fiji	38.14m	Geoffery Gardner (M61); New Caledonia	30.15m	Jese Riacebe (M54); Fiji	20.82m
Hammer throw	Costa Kousparis; Australia	59.35m CR	Abineet Ram; Fiji	50.61m	Aaron Brown; Regional Australia	26.00m
Javelin throw	Leslie Copeland; Fiji	79.22 CR	John Crandell; Australia	67.82	Pita Tamani; Fiji	61.59
Javelin throw U18	Nash Lowis; Regional Australia	71.50m	Brandon Stanaway; Australia	61.33m	Junior` Mafoa; Wallis and Futuna	52.05m
4 x 100 metres relay	Australia Aaron Stubbs; Michael Brusnahan; Tjimarri Sanderson-Milera; Nick Jannson	41.45	Fiji Aaron Powell; Banuve Tabakaucoro; Isireli Bulivorovoro; Ilaitia WaqairaDovu	41.64	FIJ Dev Mikaele Sioweli; Albert Miller; Iowane Logalaca; Keasi NaiDroska	42.73
4 x 100 metres relay U18	Fiji Malasebe Tuvusa; Tyron Chambers; Kolonio Radrudru; Josefa Tabakaucoro	43.56	Australia Callum Corbett; Nicholas Thomson; Dusty Rankin; Matt Walters	44.38	Regional Australia Matthew Cheesman; Mitchell Hujanen; Nash Lowis; Mitchell Kelly	47.98
Distance Medley	Australia	1:30.36	Fiji	1:30.60	Fiji	1:34.01

=== Women ===
Event	Gold		Silver		Bronze	
100 metres (wind:+0.3)	Toea Wisil; Papua New Guinea	11.44 CR	Emily Coppins; Australia	12.04	Makereta Naulu; Fiji	12.12
100 metres U18 (wind:+0.8)	Lateisha Willis; Australia	12.03	Miriam Peni; Papua New Guinea	12.54	Adubhi Plange; Fiji	12.54
100 metres Para (wind:+0.7)	Paige Greco; Australia	15.19	Brighde Judge-Mears; Australia	21.33	Emily Preketes; Australia	25.04
200 metres (wind:+0.7)	Jessica Peris; Regional Australia	24.56	Emily Coppins; Australia	25.06	Shirley Vunatup; Papua New Guinea	25.25
200 metres Under 15			Carol Masi; Fiji		Lusiana Ratulevu; Fiji	
400 metres	Jessica Peris; Regional Australia	55.19	Donna Koniel; Papua New Guinea	56.48	Rebecca Bennett; Australia	56.75
400 metres U18	Imogen Russell; Australia	58.33	Serenia Ragatu; Fiji	58.34	N'dea Rumble; Regional Australia	1:00.59
800 metres	Tia Brady; Australia	2:13.90	Amy Brown; Australia	2:15.69	Donna Koniel; Papua New Guinea	2:16.22
800 metres U18	Kelsie Youman; Regional Australia	2:20.32	India Williams; Australia	2:23.55	Maia Ramsden; New Zealand	2:24.10
1500 metres	Tia Brady; Australia	4:38.95 CR	Natasha Favotto; Regional Australia	4:50.25	Gaelleanne Rossignol; New Caledonia	5:04.65
3000 metres	Ruby Smee; Australia	10:12.93	Shania Murray; Australia	10:30.43	Mary Kua; Papua New Guinea	11:29.32
5000 metres	Sharon Firisua; Solomon Islands	18:36.75 CR	Dianah Matekali; Solomon Islands	19:00.94	Natasha Favotto; Regional Australia	19:21.86
10000 metres	Sharon Firisua; Solomon Islands	38:58.43 CR	Dianah Matekali; Solomon Islands	39:28.07	NA	NA
100 metres hurdles (wind:+0.9)	Eliana Seymour; Australia	14.14 CR	Afure Adah; Papua New Guinea	14.86	Jane Hickie; Australia	14.99
100 metres hurdles Under 18	Lateisha Willis; Australia	13.64	Nicole Reynolds; Australia	13.94	Leilani Jones; Regional Australia	21.93
400 metres hurdles	Donna Koniel; Papua New Guinea	1:03.40	Annie Topal; Papua New Guinea	1:07.91	Natalie Laurie; Australia	1:18.71
400 metres hurdles U18	Tessa Constantine; Australia	1:02.96	NA	NA	NA	NA
High jump	Hannah Joye; Australia	1.80m CR	Rellie Kaputin; Papua New Guinea	1.69m	Nanise Tavisa; Fiji	1.60m
High jump Under 18	Carley Stieler; Australia	1.72m	Sophie Tiver; Australia	1.63m	Amy Coulston; Australia	1.60m
Long jump	Rellie Kaputin; Papua New Guinea	5.95m (wind:+0.1) CR	Sesenieli Donu; Fiji	5.43m (wind:+0.3)	Annie Topal; Papua New Guinea	5.32m (wind:+0.5)
Long jump U18	Camryn Newton-Smith; Australia	5.48m (wind:+0.7)	Jane Hickie; Australia	5.30m (wind:+0.0)	Mereseini Waqatoki; Fiji	5.23m (wind:+0.3)
Triple jump	Rellie Kaputin; Papua New Guinea	12.25m (wind:-2.6) CR	Milika Tuivanuavou; Fiji	11.65m (wind:-2.3)	Annabelle Parmegiani; Australia	11.63m (wind:-2.5)
Triple jump Under 18	Kayla Cuba; Australia	11.99m	Taufa Cocker; Fiji	11.01m	Maca Korolevu; Fiji	10.55m
Shot put	Mia Cunningham; Australia	12.43m	Linda Selui; New Caledonia	12.22m	Alice Peters; Fiji	11.60m
Shot put U18	Sam Lenton; Australia	14.73m	Siiva Tafiti; Australia	14.67m	Kristina Moore; Australia	14.58m
Shot put Under 15	Tarairi Erasito; Fiji	11.46m				
Shot put Para	Lainiana Ere F36; Fiji	6.03m	Naibili Tagicakibau; Fiji	5.93m	NA	NA
Discus throw	Karen Clarke; Australia	45.68m CR	Milika Tuivanuavou; Fiji	42.55m	Atanasia Takosi; New Caledonia	42.19m
Hammer throw	Brianna Stephens; Norfolk Island	42.84m	Coranne Truques; New Caledonia	41.31m	Jacklyn Travertz; Papua New Guinea	35.31m
Javelin throw	Tianah List; Australia	47.17m CR	Linda Selui; New Caledonia	46.13m	Karen Clarke; Australia	42.82m
Javelin throw U18	Ellie Bowyer; Australia	49.42m	Emily Nicholas; Australia	44.34m	Emma Butler; Australia	43.62m
Heptathlon	Adrine Monagi; Papua New Guinea	4889 pts	Natalie Laurie; Australia	3982 pts	Atilaite Inoke; Fiji	3054 pts
Heptathlon U18	Camryn Newton-Smith; Australia	4863 pts	Marnie Clarkson; Australia	4466 pts	NA	NA
5000 Metre Race Walk	Simone Mcinnes; Australia	24:19.22	Natalie Laurie; Australia	29:02.48	NA	NA
5000 Metre Race Walk U18	Rhiannon Lovegrove; Australia	26:50.23	NA	NA	NA	NA
4 x 100 metres relay	Fiji	47.03 CR	FIJD	48.09	Regional Australia	49.06
Distance Medley	Australia	1:45.27	Fiji	1:46.04	Regional Australia	1:49.45

== Medal table ==
Rank	Nation	Gold	Silver	Bronze	Total
1	Australia	36	26	14	76
2	Fiji	10	15	14	39
3	Papua New Guinea	8	8	6	22
4	Regional Australia	3	0	5	8
5	Solomon Islands	1	2	0	3
6	Norfolk Island	1	1	0	2
7	Fiji	1	0	3	4
8	New Caledonia	0	2	3	5
9	Tonga	0	1	0	1
10	Wallis and Futuna	0	0	2	2
11	New Zealand	0	0	1	1
11	Palau	0	0	1	1
Totals (12 entries)		60	55	49	164
