= Betty Burua =

Papua New Guinean track athlete

Personal information
- Born: 24 November 1986 (age 39) Port Moresby, Papua New Guinea

Sport
- Sport: Track and field
- Event(s): Sprints, Triple Jump
Medal record
Women's Athletics
Representing Papua New Guinea
Pacific Games
Gold medal – first place	2011 Nouméa	400 m Hurdles
Gold medal – first place	2011 Nouméa	Triple Jump
Bronze medal – third place	2015 Port Moresby	400 m
(South) Pacific Mini Games
Gold medal – first place	2013 Mata Utu	400 m
Gold medal – first place	2013 Mata Utu	400 m Hurdles
Gold medal – first place	2013 Mata Utu	Triple Jump
Gold medal – first place	2013 Mata Utu	4×100 m Relay
Gold medal – first place	2013 Mata Utu	4×400 m Relay
Oceania Championships
Gold medal – first place	2006 Apia	800 m
Gold medal – first place	2006 Apia	4×100 m Relay
Gold medal – first place	2008 Saipan	4×100 m Relay
Gold medal – first place	2010 Cairns	4×100 m Relay
Gold medal – first place	2015 Cairns	400 m
Gold medal – first place	2015 Cairns	400 m Hurdles
Gold medal – first place	2015 Cairns	4×100 m Relay
Gold medal – first place	2015 Cairns	4×400 m Relay
Silver medal – second place	2008 Saipan	400 m
Silver medal – second place	2008 Saipan	800 m Medley Relay
Silver medal – second place	2010 Cairns	400 m
Silver medal – second place	2015 Cairns	200 m
Silver medal – second place	2015 Cairns	800 m Medley Relay
Bronze medal – third place	2008 Saipan	200 m
Bronze medal – third place	2010 Cairns	800 m
- Updated on 22 July 2017

Betty Burua (born 24 November 1986) is a Papua New Guinean track athlete who specializes in sprinting and the triple jump. She ran the 400 meters at the 2011 World Championships in Daegu, South Korea clocking 56.98 seconds to place 33 overall.

== Personal Bests ==
Type	Event	Best	Date	Place	Meet
Outdoor	200 meters	23.74 (+0.5)	9 May 2015	Cairns, Australia	2015 Oceania Athletics Championships
Outdoor	400 metres	53.63	28 June 2015	(United Kingdom) Loughborough, Great Britain	
Outdoor	400 metres Hurdles	58.02 NR	29 March 2015	Brisbane, Australia	Australian National Championships
Outdoor	Triple Jump	11.95 m (+1.1)	6 September 2013	Mata Utu, Wallis and Futuna	2013 Pacific Mini Games
Indoor	400 metres	55.48 NR	26 February 2011	Baton Rouge, United States	SWAC Championship
Indoor	1500 meters	6:26.95 NR	23 January 2009	Baton Rouge, United States	

- All information taken from IAAF profile.
