= Banuve Tabakaucoro =

Fijian sprinter (born 1992)

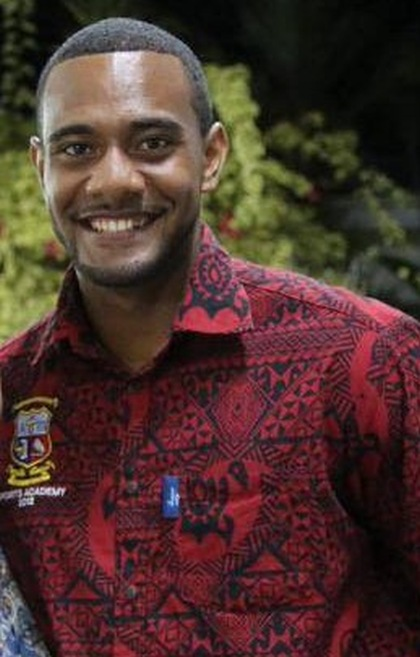
- Tabakaucoro in April 2014

Personal information
- Full name: Ratu Banuve Lalabalavu Tabakaucoro
- Nationality: Fiji
- Born: 4 September 1992 (age 33) Suva, Fiji
- Height: 1.83 m (6 ft 0 in)
- Weight: 82 kg (181 lb)

Sport
- Country: Fiji
- Sport: Athletics
- Event(s): 100 m, 200 m
- College team: Marist Brothers High School
- Coached by: Bola Tafo'ou

Achievements and titles
- Personal best(s): 10.20s (100 m); 20.53s (200 m)
Medal record
Men's Athletics
Representing Fiji
Pacific Games
Gold medal – first place	2011 Nouméa	100 m
Gold medal – first place	2011 Nouméa	200 m
Gold medal – first place	2011 Nouméa	4x100 m relay
Gold medal – first place	2015 Port Moresby	100 m
Gold medal – first place	2015 Port Moresby	200 m
Silver medal – second place	2015 Port Moresby	4x400 m relay
Silver medal – second place	2015 Port Moresby	4x100 m relay
Gold medal – first place	2019 Apia	100 m
Gold medal – first place	2019 Apia	200 m
Pacific Mini Games
Gold medal – first place	2013 Mata-Utu	100m
Gold medal – first place	2013 Mata-Utu	200m
Gold medal – first place	2013 Mata-Utu	4x400m relay
Silver medal – second place	2009 Rarotonga	100 m
Silver medal – second place	2009 Rarotonga	200 m
Oceania Championships
Gold medal – first place	2010 Cairns	4x100 m relay
Gold medal – first place	2010 Cairns	800 m medley relay
Gold medal – first place	2011 Apia	100 m
Gold medal – first place	2011 Apia	200 m
Gold medal – first place	2011 Apia	4x100 m relay
Gold medal – first place	2011 Apia	4x400 m relay
Gold medal – first place	2013 Papeete	100 m
Gold medal – first place	2013 Papeete	200 m
Gold medal – first place	2014 Avarua	100 m
Gold medal – first place	2014 Avarua	4x100 m
Gold medal – first place	2015 Cairns	100 m
Gold medal – first place	2015 Cairns	4x100 m
Gold medal – first place	2015 Cairns	800 m medley relay
Silver medal – second place	2019 Townsville	200 m
Silver medal – second place	2013 Papeete	800 m medley relay
Silver medal – second place	2014 Avarua	4x400 m
Silver medal – second place	2015 Cairns	200 m
Silver medal – second place	2015 Cairns	4x400 m
- Updated on 27 April 2013

Ratu Banuve Lalabalavu Tabakaucoro (born 4 September 1992 in Suva) is a Fijian sprinter who specializes in the 100 and 200 metres. He is the national record holder in the men's 100 m and 200 m for Fiji.

== Biography ==
Tabakaucoro attended Marist Brothers High School Sports Science Academy and graduated in 2013.

Tabakaucoro is the only athlete in the Pacific Games history to win gold in both the 100 metres and 200 metres in 3 consecutive Pacific Games in 2011, 2015 and 2019 games.

In the 2011 Coke Games, Tabakaucoro ran his personal best in the senior boys 100 and 200 metres finals on the 29 and 30 April; he also helped his school win the 4 x 100 metres relay.

Tabakaucoro also won gold in the 100 meter, 200 meter and 4 × 100 m Relay at the Pacific Games in Nouméa, New Caledonia in September at the 2011 Pacific Games.

In March 2015, Tabakaucoro competed in the Australian Athletics Championships in Brisbane where he finished 2nd in the 100m Final with a time of 10.26s breaking the national record of 10.34s set by Jone Delai back in 1995. He also set a new national record in the 200m of 20.63s.

Tabakaucoro will compete in the 100 m and 200 m at the 2022 Commonwealth Games in Birmingham, England.

In May 2023 he received the honour in welcoming the state president and prime minister on the island of Bau with the ceremonial offering of kava on the occasion of the reconstitution of the Great Council of Chiefs.

== Personal best ==
Distance	Time	Date	Venue	Ref
100 m	10.20 s (+1.2 m/s)	8 July 2016	Suva, Fiji	
200 m	20.53 s (+1.7 m/s)	12 July 2015	Ports Moresby, 2015 Pacific Games	

== Achievements ==
Year	Competition	Venue	Position	Event	Notes
Representing Fiji
2008	Commonwealth Youth Games	Pune, India	5th (sf)	100 m	10.91 s (wind: +0.9 m/s)
2008	Commonwealth Youth Games	Pune, India	7th	Long jump	6.86 m (wind: +0.4 m/s)
2008	Commonwealth Youth Games	Pune, India	7th	4 × 100 m relay	41.79 s
2009	World Youth Championships	Brixen, Italy	3rd (qf)	100 m	10.77 s (wind: +0.7 m/s)
2009	Melanesian Championships	Gold Coast, Queensland, Australia	4th	100m	10.95 (wind: +0.1 m/s)
2009	Pacific Mini Games	Rarotonga, Cook Islands	2nd	100 m	10.68 s (wind: +1.9 m/s)
2009	Pacific Mini Games	Rarotonga, Cook Islands	2nd	200 m	21.70 s (wind: -0.4 m/s)
2010	Oceania Junior Championships	Cairns, Australia	1st	100 m	10.80 s (wind: +2.0 m/s)
2010	Oceania Junior Championships	Cairns, Australia	1st	200 m	21.69 s (wind: -0.6 m/s)
2010	Oceania Championships	Cairns, Australia	1st	4 × 100 m relay	42.02 s
2010	Oceania Championships	Cairns, Australia	1st	Mixed 800 m medlex relay	1:35.31 min
2011	Universiade	Shenzhen, China	5th (qf)	100 m	10.49 s (wind: -0.1 m/s)
2011	Universiade	Shenzhen, China	4th (qf)	200 m	21.26 s (wind: +0.0 m/s)
2011	Oceania Championships (Regional Division East)	Apia, Samoa	1st	100 m	10.46 s (wind: +1.2 m/s)
2011	Oceania Championships (Regional Division East)	Apia, Samoa	1st	200 m	21.01 s (wind: +1.9 m/s)
2011	Oceania Championships (Regional Division East)	Apia, Samoa	1st	4 × 100 m relay	41.71 s
2011	Oceania Championships (Regional Division East)	Apia, Samoa	1st	4 × 400 m relay	3:17.62 min
2011	Pacific Games	Nouméa, New Caledonia	1st	100 m	10.52 s (wind: -0.4 m/s)
2011	Pacific Games	Nouméa, New Caledonia	1st	200 m	21.18 s (wind: -1.1 m/s) GR
2011	Pacific Games	Nouméa, New Caledonia	1st	4 × 100 m relay	41.25 s
2013	Oceania Championships	Papeete, French Polynesia	1st	100 m	10.65 s (wind: -1.0 m/s)
2013	Oceania Championships	Papeete, French Polynesia	1st	200 m	21.08 s (wind: -1.5 m/s)
2013	Oceania Championships	Papeete, French Polynesia	2nd	Mixed 800 Sprint Medley relay	1:38.95 min
2013	World Championships	Moscow, Russia	46th (h)	100m	10.53 (wind: -0.1 m/s)
2013	World Championships	Moscow, Russia	40th (h)	200m	21.27 (wind: -0.2 m/s)
2013	Pacific Mini Games	Mata-Utu, Wallis and Futuna	1st	100m	10.33 (wind: 0.0 m/s)
2013	Pacific Mini Games	Mata-Utu, Wallis and Futuna	1st	200m	21.13 (wind: -2.6 m/s)
2013	Pacific Mini Games	Mata-Utu, Wallis and Futuna	—	4 × 100 m relay	DQ
2013	Pacific Mini Games	Mata-Utu, Wallis and Futuna	1st	4 × 400 m relay	3:15.38
2014	Oceania Championships	Rarotonga, Cook Islands	1st	100m	10.30 (wind: -0.2 m/s)
2014	Oceania Championships	Rarotonga, Cook Islands	1st	4 × 100 m relay	41.61
2014	Oceania Championships	Rarotonga, Cook Islands	2nd	4 × 400 m relay	3:19.13
2014	Commonwealth Games	Glasgow, United Kingdom	22nd (h)	100m	10.51 (wind: -0.4 m/s)
2014	Commonwealth Games	Glasgow, United Kingdom	16th (h)^{1}	200m	21.04 (wind: -0.5 m/s)
2015	Oceania Championships	Cairns, Queensland, Australia	1st	100m	10.22 (wind: -0.1 m/s)
2015	Oceania Championships	Cairns, Queensland, Australia	2nd	200m	20.68 (wind: +1.6 m/s)
2015	Oceania Championships	Cairns, Queensland, Australia	1st	4 × 100 m relay	40.98
2015	Oceania Championships	Cairns, Queensland, Australia	2nd	4 × 400 m relay	3:22.16
2015	Oceania Championships	Cairns, Queensland, Australia	1st	Mixed 800m sprint medley	1:35.32
2015	Pacific Games	Port Moresby, Papua New Guinea	1st	100m	10.55
2015	Pacific Games	Port Moresby, Papua New Guinea	1st	200m	20.53 GR
2015	World Championships	Beijing, China	41st (h)	100m	10.41
2021	Olympic Games	Tokyo, Japan	56th (h)	100 m	10.70
2022	World Championships	Eugene, United States	–	100 m	DQ

^{1}: Disqualified in the semifinal.
