= Nelson Stone =

Papua New Guinean sprinter

Nelson Stone OLY
Personal information
- Born: 2 June 1984 (age 42) Hula, Central Province
- Height: 1.79 m (5 ft 10 1/2 in)
- Weight: 75 kg (165 lb)

Sport
- Country: Papua New Guinea
- Sport: Athletics
- Event: 400m
Medal record
Men's Athletics
Representing Papua New Guinea
Pacific Games
Gold medal – first place	2011 Nouméa	400 m
Gold medal – first place	2011 Nouméa	4x400 m Relay
Gold medal – first place	2015 Port Moresby	400 m
Gold medal – first place	2015 Port Moresby	4x400 m Relay
Silver medal – second place	2007 Apia	4x400 m Relay
Silver medal – second place	2011 Nouméa	200 m
Silver medal – second place	2011 Nouméa	4x100 m Relay
Silver medal – second place	2015 Port Moresby	200 m
Bronze medal – third place	2007 Apia	200 m
Bronze medal – third place	2007 Apia	400 m
Oceania Championships
Gold medal – first place	2010 Cairns	200 m
Gold medal – first place	2014 Avarua	200 m
Silver medal – second place	2010 Cairns	100 m
Silver medal – second place	2010 Cairns	400 m
Silver medal – second place	2013 Papeete	200 m
Silver medal – second place	2015 Cairns	4x100 m Relay
Bronze medal – third place	2015 Cairns	400 m
- Updated on 23 August 2016

Nelson Stone (born 2 June 1984) is a Papua New Guinean runner. He competed in the 400 m event at the 2012 Summer Olympics but was eliminated in the first round despite setting a season's best time of 46.71.

== Personal bests ==
Event	Result	Venue	Date
100 m	10.59 s (wind: -0.8 m/s)	(Australia) Cairns, Queensland	23 Sep 2010
200 m	21.09 s (wind: +0.7 m/s)	(Australia) Cairns, Queensland	25 Sep 2010
400 m	46.70 s	(India) Delhi	8 Oct 2010

== Achievements ==
Year	Competition	Venue	Position	Event	Notes
Representing Papua New Guinea
2007	Melanesian Championships	Cairns, Queensland, Australia	7th	100m	11.19 (wind: -2.4 m/s)
2007	Melanesian Championships	Cairns, Queensland, Australia	3rd	400m	48.44
2007	Melanesian Championships	Cairns, Queensland, Australia	2nd	4 × 400 m relay	3:18.38
2007	Pacific Games	Apia, Samoa	3rd	200 m	21.69 s (wind: +0.4 m/s)
2007	Pacific Games	Apia, Samoa	3rd	400 m	48.16 s
2007	Pacific Games	Apia, Samoa	2nd	4 × 400 m relay	3:11.96 min
2009	Melanesian Championships	Gold Coast, Queensland, Australia	2nd	100m	10.76 (wind: +0.1 m/s)
2009	Melanesian Championships	Gold Coast, Queensland, Australia	2nd	200m	21.59 w (wind: +2.5 m/s)
2009	Melanesian Championships	Gold Coast, Queensland, Australia	1st	400m	47.61
2009	World Championships	Berlin, Germany	7th (h)	400 m	47.13 s
2010	Oceania Championships	Cairns, Australia	2nd	100 n	10.61 s (wind: -0.5 m/s)
2010	Oceania Championships	Cairns, Australia	1st	200 m	21.09 s CR NR (wind: +0.5 m/s)
2010	Oceania Championships	Cairns, Australia	2nd	400 m	47.06 s
2010	Commonwealth Games	Delhi, India	6th (sf)	200 m	21.30 s (wind: +0.4 m/s)
2010	Commonwealth Games	Delhi, India	5th (sf)	400 m	46.70 s NR
2011	Pacific Games	Nouméa, New Caledonia	2nd	200 m	21.59 s (wind: -1.1 m/s)
2011	Pacific Games	Nouméa, New Caledonia	1st	400 m	47.48 s
2011	Pacific Games	Nouméa, New Caledonia	2nd	4 × 100 m relay	41.47 s
2011	Pacific Games	Nouméa, New Caledonia	1st	4 × 400 m relay	3:12.34 min
2011	World Championships	Daegu, South Korea	30th (h)	400m	47.86
2012	Olympic Games	London, United Kingdom	6th (h)	400 m	46.71 s
2013	Oceania Championships	Papeete, French Polynesia	2nd	200 m	21.98 s (wind: -1.5 m/s)
2013	Oceania Championships	Papeete, French Polynesia	4th (h)^{1}	400m	49.20
2014	World Relays	Nassau, Bahamas	—	4 × 200 m relay	DQ
2014	Commonwealth Games	Glasgow, United Kingdom	45th (h)	200m	21.51 (wind: -0.5 m/s)
2014	Commonwealth Games	Glasgow, United Kingdom	32nd (h)	400m	47.60
2014	Commonwealth Games	Glasgow, United Kingdom	14th (h)	4 × 100 m relay	41.07
2014	Commonwealth Games	Glasgow, United Kingdom	10th (h)	4 × 400 m relay	3:10.30
2014	Oceania Championships	Rarotonga, Cook Islands	1st	200m	21.24 w (wind: +2.3 m/s)
2014	Oceania Championships	Rarotonga, Cook Islands	1st (h)^{1}	400m	48.38
2015	Oceania Championships	Cairns, Queensland, Australia	5th	200m	21.67 (wind: +1.6 m/s)
2015	Oceania Championships	Cairns, Queensland, Australia	3rd	400m	49.27
2015	Oceania Championships	Cairns, Queensland, Australia	2nd	4 × 100 m relay	41.70

^{1}: Did not show in the final.
