= Sosefo Panuve =

Personal information
- Born: 10 November 1987

Sport
- Country: Wallis and Futuna
- Sport: Javelin throw
Medal record
Men's Javelin throw
Representing Wallis and Futuna
Pacific Games
Bronze medal – third place	2011 Nouméa	Javelin
Gold medal – first place	2007 Apia	Javelin
Pacific Mini Games
Bronze medal – third place	2009 Rarotonga	Javelin
Arafura Games
Gold medal – first place	2007	Javelin
Silver medal – second place	2007	Shot put

Sosefo Hega Panuve (born 10 November 1987) is a Wallisian athlete who has represented Wallis and Futuna at the Pacific Games, Pacific Mini Games, and Arafura Games.

At the 2007 Pacific Games in Apia he won gold in the javelin. At the 2007 Arafura Games he won gold in the javelin and silver in the shot put. At the 2009 Pacific Mini Games in Rarotonga he won bronze in the javelin.

At the 2011 Pacific Games in Nouméa he won bronze in the javelin.
