= Arnold Sorina =

Vanuatuan middle-distance runner

Personal information
- Nationality: Vanuatu
- Born: 1 June 1988 (age 38) Port Vila, Efate, Vanuatu
- Height: 1.75 m (5 ft 9 in)
- Weight: 60 kg (132 lb)

Sport
- Sport: Athletics
Medal record
Men's Athletics
Representing Vanuatu
Pacific Games
Silver medal – second place	2011 Nouméa	800 m
Bronze medal – third place	2007 Apia	800 m
Bronze medal – third place	2007 Apia	1500 m
Bronze medal – third place	2007 Apia	4x400 m relay
Bronze medal – third place	2011 Nouméa	4x400 m relay
Pacific Mini Games
Silver medal – second place	2009 Rarotonga	800 m
Silver medal – second place	2009 Rarotonga	1500 m
Oceania Championships
Gold medal – first place	2011 Apia	800 m
Gold medal – first place	2011 Apia	4x400 m relay
Silver medal – second place	2012 Cairns	800 m
Bronze medal – third place	2006 Apia	800 m
Bronze medal – third place	2010 Cairns	800 m
Bronze medal – third place	2012 Cairns	4x400 m relay
- Updated on 29 April 2013

Arnold Sorina (born 1 June 1988 in Port Vila) is a Vanuatuan middle-distance runner. He competed in the 800 metres competition at the 2012 Summer Olympics but did not advance to the semifinals.

== Achievements ==
Year	Competition	Venue	Position	Event	Notes
Representing Vanuatu
2006	World Junior Championships	Beijing, China	—	400m	DQ
2006	Oceania Championships	Apia, Samoa	3rd	800 m	1:55.57 min
2007	Pacific Games	Apia, Samoa	3rd	800 m	1:55.40 min
2007	Pacific Games	Apia, Samoa	3rd	1500 m	4:03.20 min
2007	Pacific Games	Apia, Samoa	3rd	4 × 400 m relay	3:16.43 min
2009	Pacific Mini Games	Rarotonga, Cook Islands	2nd	800 m	1:56.39 min
2009	Pacific Mini Games	Rarotonga, Cook Islands	2nd	1500 m	4:15.11 min
2010	Oceania Championships	Cairns, Australia	3rd	800 m	1:53.37 min
2011	Oceania Championships (Regional Division West)	Apia, Samoa	1st	800 m	1:54.64 min
2011	Oceania Championships (Regional Division West)	Apia, Samoa	1st	4 × 400 m relay	3:23.23 min
2011	Pacific Games	Nouméa, New Caledonia	2nd	800 m	1:55.14 min
2011	Pacific Games	Nouméa, New Caledonia	3rd	4 × 400 m relay	3:13.94 min
2012	Oceania Championships (Regional Division West)	Cairns, Australia	2nd	800 m	1:53.33 min
2012	Oceania Championships (Regional Division West)	Cairns, Australia	3rd	4 × 400 m relay	3:32.21 min
