= Rosemary Turare =

Papua New Guinean athlete

Personal information
- Nationality: Papua New Guinean
- Born: 6 June 1964 (age 62)

Sport
- Sport: Middle-distance running
- Event: 1500 metres

Rosemary Turare-Omundsen (born 6 June 1964) is a Papua New Guinean former middle-distance runner. She competed in the women's 1500 metres at the 1992 Summer Olympics.
