= 2001 Melanesian Championships in Athletics =

I Melanesian Championships in Athletics
- Dates: April
- Host city: Suva, Fiji
- Level: Senior
- Events: 33 (20 men, 13 women)

The 2001 Melanesian Championships in Athletics took place in April, 2001. The event was held in Suva, Fiji, in conjunction with the Fiji national championships.

A total of 33 events were contested, 20 by men and 13 by women.

== Medal summary ==
Medal winners and their results were published on the Athletics Weekly webpage.

=== Men ===
Event	Gold		Silver		Bronze	
100 metres	Joseph Kembu; Papua New Guinea	10.8	Andrew Konai; Solomon Islands	10.8	Henry Ben; Papua New Guinea; Reuben Apuri; Solomon Islands	10.9
200 metres	Sailasa Koroitamana; Fiji	22.2	Reuben Apuri; Solomon Islands	22.5	Henry Ben; Papua New Guinea	22.6
400 metres	Remesio Namara; Fiji	49.4	Meli Cama; Fiji	51.2	David Thomas; Vanuatu	51.7
800 metres	Loresh Kumaran; Fiji	1:58.6	Peter Paul Enkae; Vanuatu	1:59.5	Gerard Solomon; Vanuatu	2:01.1
1500 metres	Esala Talebula; Fiji	4:22.8	Gerard Solomon; Vanuatu	4:23.6	Josaia Cavu; Fiji	5:15.4
5000 metres	Henry Foufaka; Solomon Islands	16:52.4	Aman Prasad; Fiji	17:27.1	Josaia Cavu; Fiji	18:58.8
10000 metres	Henry Foufaka; Solomon Islands	35:12.7	Bimlesh Kumar; Fiji	35:50.1	Abinesh Kumar; Fiji	36:07.4
Half Marathon	Bimlesh Kumar; Fiji	1:17:58	Parshottam Lal; Fiji	1:19:18	Abinesh Kumar; Fiji	1:20:17
3000 metres steeplechase	Esala Talebula; Fiji	10:04.9	Peter Paul Enkae; Vanuatu	11:05.0		
400 metres hurdles	Meli Cama; Fiji	57.2	Sunia Cama; Fiji	60.3		
High jump	Lorima Vunisa; Fiji	1.96m	Jone Kalouniviti; Fiji	1.93m	Robert Elder; Fiji	1.90m
Long jump	Shaun Apisai; Fiji	6.23m	Sepesa Leweniquila; Fiji	6.22m	Hendricks Tari; Vanuatu	6.15m
Triple jump	Felix Rosa; Fiji	13.37m	Simon Benari; Papua New Guinea	13.01m	Lorima Vunisa; Fiji	12.69m
Shot put	Iosefo Vuloaloa; Fiji	13.03m	Sikipio Fihaki; Fiji	11.92m	James Dominiko; Fiji	11.56m
Discus throw	Sikipio Fihaki; Fiji	44.35m	Sosefo Fonorito; Fiji	41.44m	Iosefo Vuloaloa; Fiji	34.24m
Hammer throw	Brentt Jones; Norfolk Island	51.21m	James Dominiko; Fiji	31.10m	Sosefo Fonorito; Fiji	29.51m
Javelin throw	Iosefo Vuloaloa; Fiji	58.98m	Simon Benari; Papua New Guinea	48.14m	Tomasi Gonelevu; Fiji	41.36m
20 Kilometres Road Walk	Rajeev Patel; Fiji	1:56:04				
4 x 100 metres relay	Solomon Islands	42.9	Papua New Guinea	43.0	Fiji	43.1
4 x 400 metres relay	Fiji	3:25.2	Vanuatu	3:29.6	Ratu Kadavulevu School Fiji	3:33.6

=== Women ===
Event	Gold		Silver		Bronze	
100 metres (wind: 0.7 m/s)	Mae Koime; Papua New Guinea	12.5	Vasiti Vatureba; Fiji	12.7	Nessie Ogisi; Papua New Guinea	12.9
200 metres	Makelesi Bulikiobo; Fiji	24.8	Vasiti Vatureba; Fiji	25.8	Mary Estelle Kapalu; Vanuatu	26.0
400 metres	Makelesi Bulikiobo; Fiji	58.3	Mary Estelle Kapalu; Vanuatu	59.0	Vasiti Vatureba; Fiji	60.9
800 metres	Sisilia Dauniwe; Fiji	2:24.5				
1500 metres	Jedda Fletcher; Norfolk Island	6:15.9				
400 metres hurdles	Mary Estelle Kapalu; Vanuatu	65.5	Ledua Baker; Fiji	86.2		
High jump	Tereima Rara; Fiji	1.45m	Amelia R. Fiji	1.40m		
Long jump	Vasiti Vatureba; Fiji	4.61m	Mere Gavidi; Fiji	4.56m	Melissa Moli; Vanuatu	4.48m
Shot put	Sisilia Lau; Fiji	9.62m	Sisilia Naqelo; Fiji	9.52m		
Discus throw	Venina Rokowati; Fiji	30.32m	Wila Nailatimate; Fiji	27.63m		
Javelin throw	Sisilia Lau; Fiji	41.20m	Mela Tabakiraka; Fiji	30.03m	Milika Roko; Fiji	26.26m
4 x 100 metres relay	Fiji	50.7				
4 x 400 metres relay	Fiji	4:04.2				

== Medal table (unofficial) ==
* Host nation (Fiji)

Rank	Nation	Gold	Silver	Bronze	Total
1	Fiji (FIJ)*	25	18	13	56
2	Solomon Islands (SOL)	3	2	1	6
3	Papua New Guinea (PNG)	2	3	3	8
4	Norfolk Island (NFK)	2	0	0	2
5	Vanuatu (VAN)	1	5	5	11
Totals (5 entries)		33	28	22	83
