= Kendra Hubbard =

Australian sprinter

Personal information
- Nationality: Australian
- Born: 29 September 1989 (age 36)
- Education: University of Melbourne

Sport
- Sport: Athletics
- Event: Sprinting

Kendra Hubbard (born 29 September 1989) is an Australian athlete. She qualified in the women's 4 × 400 metres relay event at the 2020 Summer Olympics held in Tokyo, Japan.
