= Leslie Copeland (athlete) =

Fijian javelin thrower

Personal information
- Full name: Leslie Arthur Copeland
- Born: 23 April 1988 (age 38) Tavua, Fiji
- Height: 1.83 m (6 ft 0 in)
- Weight: 102 kg (225 lb)

Sport
- Country: Fiji
- Sport: Athletics
- Event: Javelin
Medal record
Men's Athletics
Representing Fiji
Pacific Games
Gold medal – first place	2011 Nouméa	Javelin throw
Gold medal – first place	2015 Port Moresby	Javelin throw
Silver medal – second place	2007 Apia	Javelin throw
Pacific Mini Games
Gold medal – first place	2009 Rarotonga	Javelin throw
Gold medal – first place	2013 Mata-Utu	Javelin throw
Oceania Championships
Gold medal – first place	2006 Apia	Javelin throw
Gold medal – first place	2008 Saipan	Javelin throw
Gold medal – first place	2010 Cairns	Javelin throw
Gold medal – first place	2013 Pepeete	Javelin throw
Gold medal – first place	2014 Avarua	Javelin throw
- Updated on 23 August 2016

Leslie Arthur Copeland (born 23 April 1988) is a Fijian javelin thrower. His father died when he was nine, but his father's sister aided him in getting an education. He attended Marist Brothers High School and later became a champion thrower. He represented Fiji at the 2012 Summer Olympics. At the 2012 Olympics, he was one place away from making the final. He represented Fiji at the 2011 and 2013 World Championships. In the javelin throw event, he ranked 13th with a seasonal best mark but did not advance to the final. In 2016, he threw a personal best throw of 81.76 m in Sydney, Australia.

== Personal best ==
- Javelin throw: 81.76 m NR – Sydney, 2016

== Achievements ==
Year	Competition	Venue	Position	Event	Notes
Representing Fiji
2004	Commonwealth Youth Games	Bendigo, Australia	4th	Javelin (700g)	60.63 m
2005	World Youth Championships	Marrakesh, Morocco	22nd (q)	Javelin (700g)	60.51 m
2006	World Junior Championships	Beijing, China	7th	Javelin	73.13 m
2006	Oceania Championships	Apia, Samoa	1st	Javelin	67.28 m
2007	Universiade	Bangkok, Thailand	20th (q)	Javelin	62.57 m
2007	Pacific Games	Apia, Samoa	2nd	Javelin	69.84 m
2008	Oceania Championships	Saipan, Northern Mariana Islands	1st	Javelin	67.02 m
2009	Melanesian Championships	Gold Coast, Australia	1st	Javelin	67.99m
2009	Pacific Mini Games	Rarotonga, Cook Islands	1st	Javelin	74.92 m
2010	Oceania Championships	Cairns, Australia	1st	Javelin	75.08 m CR
2011	Universiade	Shenzhen, China	6th	Javelin	76.75 m
2011	World Championships	Daegu, South Korea	22nd (q)	Javelin	76.57 m
2011	Pacific Games	Nouméa, New Caledonia	1st	Javelin	78.41 m
2012	Olympic Games	London, United Kingdom	13th (q)	Javelin	80.19 m
2013	Oceania Championships	Papeete, French Polynesia	1st	Javelin	76.87 m
2013	World Championships	Moscow, Russia	33rd (q)	Javelin	72.30 m
2013	Pacific Mini Games	Mata-Utu, Wallis and Futuna	1st	Javelin	68.62m
2014	Oceania Championships	Rarotonga, Cook Islands	1st	Javelin	70.66m
2014	Commonwealth Games	Glasgow, United Kingdom	10th	Javelin	68.50 m
2016	Olympic Games	Rio de Janeiro, Brazil	32nd (q)	Javelin	76.04 m

== Seasonal bests by year ==
- 2006 – 73.13
- 2007 – 69.84
- 2008 – 74.40
- 2009 – 76.93
- 2010 – 76.95
- 2011 – 80.45
- 2012 – 80.19
- 2013 – 76.87
- 2014 – 76.10
- 2016 – 81.76
