= Toea Wisil =

Papua New Guinean sprinter

Toea Wisil OLY
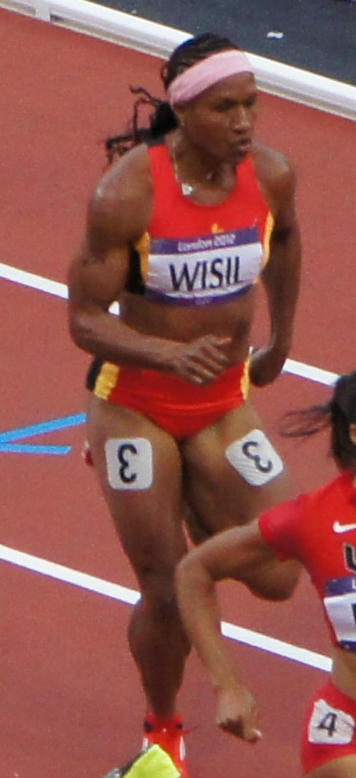
- Toea Wisil at the 2012 Summer Olympics

Personal information
- Born: 1 January 1988 (age 38) Banz, Western Highlands
- Height: 1.68 m (5 ft 6 in)
- Weight: 63 kg (139 lb)

Sport
- Country: Papua New Guinea
- Sport: Athletics
- Event: 100 metres 200 metres
Medal record
Women's Athletics
Representing Papua New Guinea
Pacific Games
Gold medal – first place	2007 Apia	4x100 m Relay
Gold medal – first place	2007 Apia	4x400 m Relay
Gold medal – first place	2011 Nouméa	100 m
Gold medal – first place	2011 Nouméa	200 m
Gold medal – first place	2011 Nouméa	400 m
Gold medal – first place	2011 Nouméa	4x100 m Relay
Gold medal – first place	2011 Nouméa	4x400 m Relay
Gold medal – first place	2015 Port Moresby	100 m
Gold medal – first place	2015 Port Moresby	200 m
Gold medal – first place	2015 Port Moresby	400 m
Gold medal – first place	2015 Port Moresby	4x400 m Relay
Gold medal – first place	2019 Apia	100 m
Gold medal – first place	2019 Apia	200 m
Gold medal – first place	2019 Apia	400 m
Gold medal – first place	2019 Apia	4x400 m Relay
Silver medal – second place	2019 Apia	4x100 m Relay
Silver medal – second place	2007 Apia	400 m
Silver medal – second place	2015 Port Moresby	4x100 m Relay
Bronze medal – third place	2007 Apia	100 m
Bronze medal – third place	2007 Apia	200 m
(South) Pacific Mini Games
Gold medal – first place	2005 Koror	4x400 m Relay
Gold medal – first place	2013 Mata-Utu	100 m
Gold medal – first place	2013 Mata-Utu	200 m
Gold medal – first place	2013 Mata-Utu	4x100 m Relay
Gold medal – first place	2013 Mata-Utu	4x400 m Relay
Gold medal – first place	2017 Vanuatu	100 m
Gold medal – first place	2022 Northern Mariana Islands	100 m
Gold medal – first place	2022 Northern Mariana Islands	200 m
Gold medal – first place	2022 Northern Mariana Islands	4x100 m Relay
Gold medal – first place	2022 Northern Mariana Islands	4x400 m Relay
Silver medal – second place	2005 Koror	400 m
Silver medal – second place	2005 Koror	4x100 m Relay
Silver medal – second place	2005 Koror	400 m
Silver medal – second place	2005 Koror	4x100 m Relay
Silver medal – second place	2013 Mata-Utu	400 m
Silver medal – second place	2013 Mata-Utu	400 m
Silver medal – second place	2017 Vanuatu	200 m
Silver medal – second place	2017 Vanuatu	4x100 m Relay
Bronze medal – third place	2005 Koror	100 m
Bronze medal – third place	2005 Koror	200 m
Oceania Championships
Gold medal – first place	2006 Apia	4x100 m Relay
Gold medal – first place	2008 Saipan	4x100 m Relay
Gold medal – first place	2010 Cairns	100 m
Gold medal – first place	2010 Cairns	200 m
Gold medal – first place	2010 Cairns	4x100 m Relay
Gold medal – first place	2013 Pepeete	100 m
Gold medal – first place	2013 Pepeete	200 m
Gold medal – first place	2014 Rarotonga	100 m
Gold medal – first place	2014 Rarotonga	4x100 m Relay
Gold medal – first place	2015 Cairns	100 m
Gold medal – first place	2015 Cairns	200 m
Gold medal – first place	2015 Cairns	4x100 m Relay
Gold medal – first place	2017 Fiji	100 m
Gold medal – first place	2017 Fiji	200 m
Silver medal – second place	2006 Apia	100 m
Silver medal – second place	2006 Apia	800 m medley Relay
Silver medal – second place	2008 Saipan	100 m
Silver medal – second place	2008 Saipan	200 m
Silver medal – second place	2015 Cairns	800 m medley Relay
Bronze medal – third place	2006 Apia	200 m
Bronze medal – third place	2006 Apia	400 m
- Updated on 23 August 2016

Toea Wisil (1 January 1988) is an athlete from Papua New Guinea who specializes in sprints. She was selected as her nation's flag bearer at the 2012 Summer Olympics Parade of Nations. In her race, she impressed American TV announcer Ato Bolden by running an eased up 11.60 into a strong headwind, the number one qualifier from the preliminary round of the 100 m. She was equally impressive in the quarter final, beating the field including Allyson Felix out of the blocks and coming within .05 of qualifying to the semi-final round, finishing ahead of athletes that did not need to run in the preliminary round. During the Pacific Games, she won a triple-triple individual gold, 100 m, 200 m and 400 m, during 3 different editions, 2011, 2015 and 2019.

== Personal life ==
Her brother Pais Wisil also holds national sprint records and represented their country at international level. Additionally, their older brother Kupun represented Papua New Guinea in the 100 metres at two Commonwealth Games.

== Personal bests ==
- 100 m: 11.29 s NR (wind: +1.9 m/s) – (Fiji) Suva, 9 July 2016
- 200 m: 23.13 s NR (wind: +1.5 m/s) – (Australia) Canberra, 12 March 2017
- 400 m: 53.19 s NR – (Australia) Gold Coast, 14 August 2010

== Achievements ==
Year	Competition	Venue	Position	Event	Notes
Representing Papua New Guinea
2004	Oceania Youth Championships	Townsville, Australia	2nd	200 m	25.91
2004	Oceania Youth Championships	Townsville, Australia	2nd	400 m	58.82
2004	Oceania Youth Championships	Townsville, Australia	2nd	800 m medley relay	1:52.04
2005	Melanesian Championships	Lae, Papua New Guinea	2nd	100m	12.42 (wind: -0.9 m/s)
2005	Melanesian Championships	Lae, Papua New Guinea	2nd	200m	25.70 (wind: -0.8 m/s)
2005	Melanesian Championships	Lae, Papua New Guinea	2nd	400m	57.28
2005	Melanesian Championships	Lae, Papua New Guinea	1st	4 × 100 m relay	49.04
2005	Melanesian Championships	Lae, Papua New Guinea	1st	4 × 400 m relay	3:57.01
2005	World Youth Championships	Marrakesh, Morocco	5th (h)	200 m	25.04 s (wind: +0.7 m/s)
2005	World Youth Championships	Marrakesh, Morocco	4th (h)	400 m	57.55 s
2005	South Pacific Mini Games	Koror, Palau	3rd	100 m	12.43 s (wind: +0.1 m/s)
2005	South Pacific Mini Games	Koror, Palau	3rd	200 m	25.65 s w (wind: +2.1 m/s)
2005	South Pacific Mini Games	Koror, Palau	2nd	400 m	57.91 s
2005	South Pacific Mini Games	Koror, Palau	2nd	4 × 100 m relay	49.16 s
2005	South Pacific Mini Games	Koror, Palau	1st	4 × 400 m relay	3:58.97 min
2006	Commonwealth Games	Melbourne, Australia	6th (h)	400m	56.72 s
2006	Commonwealth Games	Melbourne, Australia	5th	4 × 400 m relay	3:47.88 min NR
2006	World Junior Championships	Beijing, China	47th (h)	100 m	12.17 s (wind: +0.1 m/s)
2006	World Junior Championships	Beijing, China	19th (h)	4 × 100 m relay	48.40 s
2006	Oceania Championships	Apia, Samoa	2nd	100 m	12.03 s (wind: +0.2 m/s)
2006	Oceania Championships	Apia, Samoa	3rd	200 m	24.53 s (wind: +0.8 m/s)
2006	Oceania Championships	Apia, Samoa	3rd	400 m	57.26 s
2006	Oceania Championships	Apia, Samoa	1st	4 × 100 m relay	48.30 s
2006	Oceania Championships	Apia, Samoa	2nd	Mixed 800 m medley relay	1:37.95 min
2007	Melanesian Championships	Cairns, Queensland, Australia	2nd	100m	12.05 (wind: -1.8 m/s)
2007	Melanesian Championships	Cairns, Queensland, Australia	3rd	200m	24.23 (wind: +0.4 m/s)
2007	Melanesian Championships	Cairns, Queensland, Australia	1st	4 × 400 m relay	3:54.12
2007	Pacific Games	Apia, Samoa	3rd	100 m	12.00 s (wind: +0.1 m/s)
2007	Pacific Games	Apia, Samoa	3rd	200 m	24.34 s (wind: +0.3 m/s)
2007	Pacific Games	Apia, Samoa	2nd	400 m	55.15 s
2007	Pacific Games	Apia, Samoa	1st	4 × 100 m relay	45.99 s
2007	Pacific Games	Apia, Samoa	1st	4 × 400 m relay	3:40.55 min GR
2008	Oceania Championships	Saipan, Northern Mariana Islands	2nd	100 m	11.94 s (wind: -1.2 m/s)
2008	Oceania Championships	Saipan, Northern Mariana Islands	2nd	200 m	24.45 s (wind: -2.1 m/s)
2008	Oceania Championships	Saipan, Northern Mariana Islands	1st	4 × 100 m relay	47.27 s
2009	Melanesian Championships	Gold Coast, Queensland, Australia	1st	100m	11.80 (wind: -1.0 m/s)
2009	Melanesian Championships	Gold Coast, Queensland, Australia	2nd	200m	24.64 (wind: +1.6 m/s)
2010	Oceania Championships	Cairns, Australia	1st	100 m	11.85 s (wind: +1.0 m/s)
2010	Oceania Championships	Cairns, Australia	1st	200 m	23.63 s w (wind: +2.6 m/s)
2010	Oceania Championships	Cairns, Australia	4th	400 m	55.87 s
2010	Oceania Championships	Cairns, Australia	1st	4 × 100 m relay	46.86 s CR
2010	Commonwealth Games	Delhi, India	4th	100 m	11.52 s (wind: +0.2 m/s)
2010	Commonwealth Games	Delhi, India	7th	200 m	23.84 s (wind: +0.8 m/s)
2010	Commonwealth Games	Delhi, India	5th (h)	4 × 400 m relay	3:40.40 min NR
2011	Pacific Games	Nouméa, New Caledonia	1st	100 m	11.96 s (wind: +0.3 m/s)
2011	Pacific Games	Nouméa, New Caledonia	1st	200 m	24.61 s (wind: -1.1 m/s)
2011	Pacific Games	Nouméa, New Caledonia	1st	400 m	54.94 s
2011	Pacific Games	Nouméa, New Caledonia	1st	4 × 100 m relay	46.30 s
2011	Pacific Games	Nouméa, New Caledonia	1st	4 × 400 m relay	3:45.32 min
2012	Olympic Games	London, United Kingdom	4th (h)	100 m	11.27 s w (wind: +2.2 m/s)
2013	Oceania Championships	Papeete, French Polynesia	1st	100 m	11.90 s (wind: -0.7 m/s)
2013	Oceania Championships	Papeete, French Polynesia	1st	200 m	24.45 s (wind: -1.1 m/s)
2013	World Championships	Moscow, Russia	31st (h)	100m	11.61 (wind: -0.3 m/s)
2013	World Championships	Moscow, Russia	44th (h)	200m	24.23 (wind: -0.1 m/s)
2013	Pacific Mini Games	Mata-Utu, Wallis and Futuna	1st	100m	11.68 (wind: +1.5 m/s)
2013	Pacific Mini Games	Mata-Utu, Wallis and Futuna	1st	200m	24.12 (wind: +1.1 m/s)
2013	Pacific Mini Games	Mata-Utu, Wallis and Futuna	2nd	400m	57.58
2013	Pacific Mini Games	Mata-Utu, Wallis and Futuna	1st	4 × 100 m relay	46.75
2013	Pacific Mini Games	Mata-Utu, Wallis and Futuna	1st	4 × 400 m relay	3:52.82
2014	Commonwealth Games	Glasgow, United Kingdom	10th (sf)	100m	11.44 (wind: +0.1 m/s)
2014	Commonwealth Games	Glasgow, United Kingdom	21st (sf)	200m	24.48 (wind: -0.2 m/s)
2014	Commonwealth Games	Glasgow, United Kingdom	12th (h)	4 × 400 m relay	3:46.26
2015	Oceania Championships	Cairns, Queensland, Australia	1st	100m	11.41 w (wind: +2.9 m/s)
2015	Oceania Championships	Cairns, Queensland, Australia	1st	200m	23.71 (wind: +0.5 m/s)
2015	Oceania Championships	Cairns, Queensland, Australia	—	400m	DNF
2015	Oceania Championships	Cairns, Queensland, Australia	1st	4 × 100 m relay	46.31
2015	Oceania Championships	Cairns, Queensland, Australia	2nd	Mixed 800m sprint medley relay	1:36.08
2017	World Championships	London, United Kingdom	27th (h)	100 m	11.41
2017	World Championships	London, United Kingdom	42nd (h)	200 m	23.93

Olympic Games
Preceded by Ryan Pini	Flagbearer for Papua New Guinea; London 2012	Succeeded by Ryan Pini
