= Frédéric Erin =

New Caledonian long jumper

Personal information
- Born: 23 April 1980 (age 46) Nouméa, New Caledonia
- Height: 188 cm (6 ft 2 in)
- Weight: 83 kg (183 lb)
Medal record
Men's athletics
Representing New Caledonia
Pacific Games
Gold medal – first place	2011 Nouméa	Long jump
Gold medal – first place	2011 Nouméa	Triple jump
Bronze medal – third place	2011 Nouméa	4x400 m relay
Silver medal – second place	2015 Port Moresby	Long jump
Bronze medal – third place	2015 Port Moresby	Triple jump
Bronze medal – third place	2015 Port Moresby	4x400 m relay

Frédéric Erin (born 23 April 1980) is a New Caledonian retired long jumper.

He won several gold medals at small regional events such as the South Pacific Games, the South Pacific Mini Games, the Arafura Games and the Oceania Athletics Championships.

New Caledonia not being a member of all athletics governing bodies, Erin could also represent France. He competed at the 2012 European Championships without reaching the final, and also became French champion the same year. He also won the Australian and New Zealand championships.

His personal best jump was 8.12 metres, achieved in September 2011 in Nouméa. This is the New Caledonian record
