= Niko Verekauta =

Fijian sprinter (born 1987)

Personal information
- Nationality: Fiji
- Born: 16 February 1987 (age 39) Nabukelevu-i-ra, Kadavu, Fiji
- Height: 1.86 m (6 ft 1 in)
- Weight: 74 kg (163 lb)

Sport
- Sport: Athletics
Medal record
Men's athletics
Representing Fiji
Pacific Games
Gold medal – first place	2007 Apia	200 m
Gold medal – first place	2007 Apia	400 m
Gold medal – first place	2007 Apia	4x100 m relay
Gold medal – first place	2007 Apia	4x400 m relay
Silver medal – second place	2011 Nouméa	4x400 m relay
(South) Pacific Mini Games
Gold medal – first place	2009 Rarotonga	100 m
Gold medal – first place	2009 Rarotonga	200 m
Gold medal – first place	2009 Rarotonga	400 m
Gold medal – first place	2009 Rarotonga	4x100 m relay
Gold medal – first place	2009 Rarotonga	4x400 m relay
Gold medal – first place	2005 Koror	4x400 m relay
Silver medal – second place	2005 Koror	400 m
- Updated on 29 April 2013

Niko Verekauta (born 16 February 1987 in Kadavu) is a Fiji Islands sprinter.

== Biography ==
He represented Fiji in the 400m sprint at 2006 Commonwealth Games and the 400m sprint at the 2008 Summer Olympics. He also won five gold medals at the Mini South Pacific Games in 2009.

== Achievements ==
Year	Competition	Venue	Position	Event	Notes
Representing Fiji
2005	South Pacific Mini Games	Koror, Palau	2nd	400 m	49.55 s
2005	South Pacific Mini Games	Koror, Palau	1st	4 × 400 m relay	3:18.26 min
2006	World Junior Championships	Beijing, China	10th (sf)	400m	46.77
2007	Pacific Games	Apia, Samoa	1st	200 m	21.26 s (wind: +0.2 m/s) GR
2007	Pacific Games	Apia, Samoa	1st	400 m	47.18 s
2007	Pacific Games	Apia, Samoa	1st	4 × 100 m relay	40.60 s
2007	Pacific Games	Apia, Samoa	1st	4 × 400 m relay	3:10.18 min
2009	Pacific Mini Games	Rarotonga, Cook Islands	1st	100 m	10.59 s (wind: +0.9 m/s)
2009	Pacific Mini Games	Rarotonga, Cook Islands	1st	200 m	21.33 s (wind: -0.4 m/s)
2009	Pacific Mini Games	Rarotonga, Cook Islands	1st	400 m	48.83 s
2009	Pacific Mini Games	Rarotonga, Cook Islands	1st	4 × 100 m relay	41.20 s
2009	Pacific Mini Games	Rarotonga, Cook Islands	1st	4 × 400 m relay	3:20.49 min
2011	Pacific Games	Nouméa, New Caledonia	2nd	4 × 400 m relay	3:12.75 min

=== Further achievements ===
2004

Coca-Cola games 2 gold(200meters,400meters) 1 silver (relay)

2005

- Coca-Cola Games 2 gold (400m, relay)

2006

- Coca-Cola Games 2 gold (400m, relay) 1 silver(200m)
- Commonwealth Games 400m Semifinalist, Melbourne, Australia.
- World Junior Championship 400m Semifinalist, Beijing, China.
- 4*400m Oceania relay Selection team for to the world cup in Greece.

2007

- New Zealand Championship 1 bronze(400meters)
- Belgium Championship 1 Gold (400meters)
- Australia under 23 1 Silver (400meter)

2008

- New Zealand Championship 1 Gold (400meters)
- Belgium Championship 1 Gold (400meters)
- France A league Series 1 Silver (400meters)
- Europe 300m A league Placed 4th Overall
- Fiji representative to the Olympic Games in Beijing, China.

2009

- Under 23 Australian Championship 2 Gold(200m,400m)
- Represented Fiji at the World Championship in Berlin, Germany.
- Oceania Games in Gold Coast Australia 4 Gold medal(100m,200m both the relays)
