= Poro Gahekave =

Papua New Guinean middle-distance runner

Personal information
- Nationality: Papua New Guinean
- Born: Poro Michlyn Gahekave; 16 June 1993 (age 33) Kavieng, Papua New Guinea

Sport
- Sport: Middle-distance running
- Event(s): 1500 metres, 3000 m steeple-chase, 5000m
- College team: Lubbock Christian University Track & Cross Country

Poro Michlyn Gahekave (born in 1993) is a Papua New Guinean middle-distance runner.

== Career ==
Poro Gahekave competed at the Pacific Games in 2007. She (as a 14-year-old), won in Apia the inaugural gold medal of 3,000m steeplechase in 2007 and confirmed, 12 years later, this Gold medal and 2 more Gold (1500m and 5000m) again in Apia in 2019.

She also won the Silver medal in 2015 Pacific Games.
