= Salome Dell =

Papua New Guinean athlete (born 1983)

Salome Dell (born 21 March 1983) is an athlete from Papua New Guinea. She has represented her country at two Commonwealth Games and is considered Papua New Guinea's most successful middle-distance athlete.

== Life ==
Dell is from the Eastern Highlands Province of Papua New Guinea. Her athletic talent was discovered by Sean Synott, an athletic coach at Ukarumpa High School in the Aiyura Valley.

Dell first represented Papua New Guinea at the 2004 Oceania Championships. She also represented her country at the 2008 Oceania Championships, the Pacific Games (2007 and 2011), the 2006 Commonwealth Games, the 2009 World Championships in Athletics and the 2010 Commonwealth Games. In total, she won six gold medals in Pacific Games, nine individual Oceania Championships gold medals and was a runner in the four-runner relay team which won gold at the 2007 Pacific Games.
