= Papua New Guinea at the 2015 Pacific Games =

- IOC code: PNG
- National federation: Papua New Guinea Olympic Committee

4 July 2015 – 18 July 2015
- Competitors: 625 in 28 sports
- Flag bearer: Linda Pulsan
- Officials: Richard Kassman (chef de mission)
- Medals Ranked 1st: Gold 88 Silver 69 Bronze 60 Total 217

Pacific Games appearances
- 1963; 1966; 1969; 1971; 1975; 1979; 1983; 1987; 1991; 1995; 1999; 2003; 2007; 2011; 2015; 2019; 2023

Papua New Guinea competed as the host nation at the 2015 Pacific Games in Port Moresby, Papua New Guinea from 4 to 18 July 2015. Team PNG listed 625 competitors across all 28 disciplines as of 4 July 2015.

== Athletics ==
Papua New Guinea qualified 69 athletes in track and field (including parasport events) for the 2015 Games:

=== Men ===
Track and road events

Athlete	Event	Heat		Semifinal		Final	
Athlete	Event	Result	Rank	Result	Rank	Result	Rank
Wesley Logorava	100 metres	11.03	3 Q	11.15	3 Q	11.06	4
Nazmie-Lee Marai	100 metres	11.14	6 Q	11.36	6 Q	11.25	5
Kupun Wisil	100 metres	10.86	2 Q	11.08	2 Q	11.04	3rd place, bronze medalist(s)
Charles Livuan	200 metres	22.20	5 Q	22.00	5 Q	21.82	4
Theo Piniau	200 metres	22.19	2 Q	22.17	3 Q	21.37	3rd place, bronze medalist(s)
Nelson Stone	200 metres	22.33	3 Q	21.76	2 Q	21.28	2nd place, silver medalist(s)
Kaminiel Matlaun	400 metres	49.71	3 Q	—N/a		48.43	3rd place, bronze medalist(s)
Theo Piniau	400 metres	48.71	1 Q	—N/a		48.08	2nd place, silver medalist(s)
Nelson Stone	400 metres	48.79	2 Q	—N/a		47.56	1st place, gold medalist(s)
Veherney Babob	800 metres	2:01.96	9	—N/a		Did not advance	
Kaminiel Matlaun	800 metres	2:02.12	4 Q	—N/a		1:53.85	1st place, gold medalist(s)
Martin Orovo	800 metres	2:01.61	3 Q	—N/a		1:57.24	3rd place, bronze medalist(s)
Skene Kiage	1500 metres	—N/a				4:22.62	5
Martin Orovo	1500 metres	—N/a				4:20.41	3rd place, bronze medalist(s)
George Yamak	1500 metres	—N/a				4:19.38	2nd place, silver medalist(s)
Kupsy Bisamo	5000 metres	—N/a				16:06.03	4
George Yamak	5000 metres	—N/a				DNF	—N/a
Sapolai Yao	5000 metres	—N/a				16:20.60	5
Kupsy Bisamo	10,000 metres	—N/a				33:31.53	3rd place, bronze medalist(s)
Simbai Kaspar	10,000 metres	—N/a				38:44.53	8
Abel Siune	10,000 metres	—N/a				35:46.02	6
Kupsy Bisamo	Half Marathon	—N/a				1:14:11.00	1st place, gold medalist(s)
Skene Kiage	Half Marathon	—N/a				1:19:29.00	8
Sapolai Yao	Half Marathon	—N/a				1:18:50.00	6
Mowen Boino	110 metres hurdles	—N/a				14.94	2nd place, silver medalist(s)
Wala Gime	110 metres hurdles	—N/a				14.80	1st place, gold medalist(s)
Wesley Logorava	110 metres hurdles	—N/a				21.13	7
Mowen Boino	400 metres Hurdles	53.36	1 Q	—N/a		52.51	1st place, gold medalist(s)
Wala Gime	400 metres Hurdles	55.90	3 Q	—N/a		53.70	3rd place, bronze medalist(s)
Peniel Joshua	400 metres Hurdles	54.46	2 Q	—N/a		53.14	2nd place, silver medalist(s)
Andipas Georasi	3000 metres Steeplechase	—N/a				10:14.15	5
Skene Kiage	3000 metres Steeplechase	—N/a				9:47.80	2nd place, silver medalist(s)
Sapolai Yao	3000 metres Steeplechase	—N/a				9:38.89	1st place, gold medalist(s)
Theo Piniau; Nelson Stone; Wesley Logorava; Kupun Wisil	4×100 metre Relay	—N/a				40.62	1st place, gold medalist(s)
Mowen Boino; Kaminiel Matlaun; Theo Piniau; Nelson Stone	4×400 metre Relay	—N/a				3:13.86	1st place, gold medalist(s)

Field events

Athlete	Event	Final	
Athlete	Event	Distance	Position
Karo Iga	High jump	1.91	7
Conellius Pascha	High jump	1.97	4
Robson Yinambe	High jump	NM	N/A
Idau Asigau	Pole vault	NM	N/A
Karo Iga	Pole vault	3.85	2nd place, silver medalist(s)
Peniel Richard	Pole vault	3.65	4
Idau Asigau	Long jump	7.32	3rd place, bronze medalist(s)
Karo Iga	Long jump	6.75	8
Steven Morea Ray	Long jump	6.94	7
Patrick Hou	Triple jump	14.34	5
Peniel Richard	Triple jump	15.22	2nd place, silver medalist(s)
Mong Tavol	Triple jump	14.22	6
Debono Paraka	Shot put	14.96	4
Debono Paraka	Discus throw	47.13	2nd place, silver medalist(s)
Slater Karum	Javelin throw	56.34	4
Clestus Mosi	Javelin throw	52.57	6

Combined events – Decathlon

Athlete	Event	100 m	LJ	SP	HJ	400 m	110H	DT	PV	JT	1500 m	Final	Rank
Robson Yinambe	Result	11.37	6.62m	10.25m	1.93m	51.05	16.28	31.07m	3.40m	48.94m	5:00.54	6288	1st place, gold medalist(s)
Robson Yinambe	Points	780	725	501	740	767	702	486	457	573	557	6288	1st place, gold medalist(s)

Para events - Track and Field

Athlete	Event	Final	
Athlete	Event	Result	Rank
Francis Kompaon T46	100 metres Ambulatory	11.87	2nd place, silver medalist(s)
Elias Larry T37	100 metres Ambulatory	13.73	4
Samuel Nason T46	100 metres Ambulatory	12.24	3rd place, bronze medalist(s)
Athlete	Event	Final	
Athlete	Event	Distance	Position
Porua Das F56	Shot Put Secured Throw	6.52	6
Lek Kange F57	Shot Put Secured Throw	6.35	7
Iwakie Tumala F57	Shot Put Secured Throw	5.91	8
Sent Anis F42	Javelin Ambulatory	38.25	1st place, gold medalist(s)
Steven Gabriel F46	Javelin Ambulatory	37.00	5
Martin Gereo F44	Javelin Ambulatory	36.38	4

=== Women ===
Track and road events

Athlete	Event	Heat		Final	
Athlete	Event	Result	Rank	Result	Rank
Adrine Monagi	100 metres	12.55	6 Q	12.72	4
Miriam Peni	100 metres	12.49	4 Q	12.75	5
Toea Wisil	100 metres	12.08	1 Q	11.86	1st place, gold medalist(s)
Betty Burua	200 metres	25.52	4 Q	25.91	4
Shirley Vunatup	200 metres	26.01	8 q	DNS	N/A
Toea Wisil	200 metres	24.34	1 Q	24.05	1st place, gold medalist(s)
Betty Burua	400 metres	55.97	1 Q	55.21	3rd place, bronze medalist(s)
Donna Koniel	400 metres	57.82	6 Q	54.29	2nd place, silver medalist(s)
Toea Wisil	400 metres	56.84	2 Q	54.17	1st place, gold medalist(s)
Jenny Albert	800 metres	—N/a		2:15.79	2nd place, silver medalist(s)
Donna Koniel	800 metres	—N/a		2:12.78	1st place, gold medalist(s)
Tuna Tine	800 metres	—N/a		2:21.67	4
Jenny Albert	1500 metres	—N/a		4:45.47	2nd place, silver medalist(s)
Poro Gahekave	1500 metres	—N/a		4:51.72	3rd place, bronze medalist(s)
Miriam Goiye	1500 metres	—N/a		4:45.44	1st place, gold medalist(s)
Ongan Awa	5000 metres	—N/a		18:24.48	3rd place, bronze medalist(s)
Mary Kua	5000 metres	—N/a		18:38.66	4
Rama Kumilgo	5000 metres	—N/a		18:23.83	2nd place, silver medalist(s)
Ongan Awa	10,000 metres	—N/a		39.07.97	2nd place, silver medalist(s)
Miriam Goiye	10,000 metres	—N/a		40:12.02	4
Mary Kua	10,000 metres	—N/a		DQ	N/A
Miriam Goiye	Half Marathon	—N/a		1:31:22	3rd place, bronze medalist(s)
Maria Kuanduma	Half Marathon	—N/a		DNF	N/A
Bala Nicholas	Half Marathon	—N/a		1:38:48	7
Afure Adah	100 metres hurdles	—N/a		14.83	4
Sharon Kwarula	100 metres hurdles	—N/a		14.40	1st place, gold medalist(s)
Betty Burua	400 metres hurdles	—N/a		DNS	N/A
Donna Koniel	400 metres hurdles	—N/a		58.28 GR	1st place, gold medalist(s)
Sharon Kwarula	400 metres hurdles	—N/a		60.17	2nd place, silver medalist(s)
Poro Gahekave	3000 metres steeplechase	—N/a		11:31.66	2nd place, silver medalist(s)
Rama Kumilgo	3000 metres steeplechase	—N/a		11:26.51	1st place, gold medalist(s)
Carolyn Mando	3000 metres steeplechase	—N/a		12.03.32	4
Miriam Peni; Toea Wisil; Adrine Monagi; Sharon Kwarula	4 × 100 metres relay	—N/a		46.27	2nd place, silver medalist(s)
Sharon Kwarula; Donna Koniel; Afure Adah; Toea Wisil	4 × 400 metres relay	—N/a		3:45.13	1st place, gold medalist(s)

Field events

Athlete	Event	Final	
Athlete	Event	Distance	Position
Delilah Kami	High jump	1.64	3rd place, bronze medalist(s)
Rellie Kaputin	High jump	1.77	1st place, gold medalist(s)
Naomi Kerari	High jump	1.67	2nd place, silver medalist(s)
Delilah Kami	Pole vault	2.20	5
Rellie Kaputin	Long jump	5.97	1st place, gold medalist(s)
Adrine Monagi	Long jump	5.76	2nd place, silver medalist(s)
Helen Philemon	Long jump	5.64	3rd place, bronze medalist(s)
Rellie Kaputin	Triple jump	12.65	1st place, gold medalist(s)
Naomi Kerari	Triple jump	10.93	5
Annie Topal	Triple jump	11.99	3rd place, bronze medalist(s)
Kapu Kapi	Shot put	10.72	8
Jane Pulu	Shot put	10.91	7
Sharon Toako	Shot put	9.99	9
Jane Pulu	Javelin throw	40.77	4
Sharon Toako	Javelin throw	39.87	5
Kapu Kapi	Hammer throw	25.83	8
Sharon Toako	Hammer throw	29.25	7
Jacklyn Travertz	Hammer throw	35.78	6

Combined events – Heptathlon

Athlete	Event	100H	HJ	SP	200 m	LJ	JT	800 m	Final	Rank
Adrine Monagi	Result	14.99	1.71m	9.85m	25.87	5.87m	35.53m	2:38.67	5019	1st place, gold medalist(s)
Adrine Monagi	Points	843	867	520	809	810	582	588	5019	1st place, gold medalist(s)
Helen Philemon	Result	15.30	1.50m	9.77m	25.99	5.60m	25.67m	2:38.36	4451	3rd place, bronze medalist(s)
Helen Philemon	Points	802	621	514	798	729	395	592	4451	3rd place, bronze medalist(s)
Eunice Steven	Result	16.43	1.53m	9.33m	27.91	5.30m	35.9m	2:38.89	4259	5
Eunice Steven	Points	662	655	486	638	643	589	586	4259	5

Para events

Athlete	Event	Final	
Athlete	Event	Distance	Position
Regina Edward F44	Shot Put Ambulatory	8.83	2nd place, silver medalist(s)
Scholly Lukas F44	Shot Put Ambulatory	7.49	4
Vero Paul-Nime F42	Shot Put Ambulatory	6.42	3rd place, bronze medalist(s)

== Basketball ==
Papua New Guinea qualified men's and women's teams in basketball (28 athletes):

Women

- Betty Angula
- Emma Nicole Daroa
- Julie-Anne Diro
- Opa Opai Eko
- Mary Elavo
- Rosa Lausi Kairi
- Emily Koivi
- Marca Leah Muri
- Josie Vigeel Sam
- Nwster Sape
- Nape Waka
- Louisa Wallace

Men

- Moses Lune Apiko
- Gabriel Frank Elavo
- Aron Genai Farmer
- Robert Avosa Kave
- Matineng-Iakah Leahy
- Mika John Loko
- Apia Muri
- Dia Muri
- Purari Muri
- Wally Parapa
- Liam Allan Wright
- Lloyd James Wright

== Beach volleyball ==
Papua New Guinea qualified four athletes in beach volleyball:

Women

- Alice Ito
- Diane Moia

Men

- Richard Kilarupa
- Mea Moha

== Bodybuilding ==
Women

- Pau Moses
- Misa Avefa

Men

- Pascol Sabin
- Michael Mondo
- Steve Bomal
- Mark Donald
- Selen Jim
- Wilfred Kurua
- Jack Viyufa
- Donald Kaiwi

== Boxing ==
PNG qualified 13 athletes in boxing:

Women

- Debbie Baki Koare (75 kg)
- Raphaella Baki (60 kg)
- Philo Magaiva (51 kg)

Men

- Andrew Aisaga (69 kg)
- Tom Boga (64 kg)
- Robert Gabriel (81 kg)
- Thadius Katua (60 kg)
- Charles Keama (49 kg)
- Jonathan Keama (75 kg)
- Vincent Kora (91 kg)
- Lui Magaiva (52 kg)
- Henry Uming (56 kg)
- Lucas Wakore (91 kg+)

== Cricket ==
PNG qualified men's and women's teams in cricket (26 players):

Women

Women's tournament.

- Kaia Arua
- Helen Buruka
- Boni David
- Veru Kila Frank
- Kopi John
- Varoi Igo Morea
- Ravini Oa
- Konio Oala
- Norma Ovasuru
- Tanya Ruma
- Pauke Siaka
- Brenda Hoi Tau
- Mairi Tom

Men

Men's tournament.

- Christopher Ralai Amini
- Dogodo Bau
- Kohu Dai
- Kiplin Doriga
- Raymond Haoda
- Ryley Hekure
- Hiri Hiri
- Jason Kila
- Alei Nao
- Nosaina Pokana
- Raho Sam
- Joel Tom
- Vagi Morea

== Field hockey ==
Women

- Ruby Kisapai
- Rosemary Miria
- Martina Julius Dusty
- Kari Raurela
- Vanessa Perry Michael
- Alice Fred
- Jessica Kevan
- Carolyn Mulina
- Terry Kiapin

Men

- Yahie Kusunan
- Milton Kisapai
- Hussein Lowah
- Rex Loth
- Eddie Gebo
- Sapau Tapo
- Michael Pomat
- Nelson Tom
- Martin Kanamon

== Football ==
Papua New Guinea qualified men's and women's teams in football (46 athletes):

Women

– Women's tournament.

- Fidelma Watpore
- Sandra Birum
- Georgina Kaikas
- Meagen Gunemba
- Ramona Padio
- Kesai Kotome
- Dorcas Sesevo
- Lucy Maino
- Grace Steven
- Lace Kunei
- Joelyn Aimi
- Aida Alice Gerota
- Belinda Giada
- Deslyn Siniu
- Barbara Muta
- Jenisa Ulengit
- Judith Gunemba
- Carolyn Obi
- Yvonne Gabong
- Nicolla Ruth Niaman
- Talitha Irakau
- Fatima Rama
- Marie Kaipu

Men

– Men's tournament.

Head coach: (New Zealand) Ricki Herbert

No.	Pos.	Player	Date of birth (age)	Caps	Goals	Club
1	GK	Ishmael Pole	25 January 1993 (age 33)	0	0	(Papua New Guinea Football Association) Hekari United
20	GK	Charles Lepani	20 August 1994 (age 31)	0	0	(Papua New Guinea Football Association) FC Port Moresby
2	DF	Abel Redenut	27 April 1995 (age 30)	0	0	(Papua New Guinea Football Association) FC Port Moresby
3	DF	Otto Kusunan		0	0	(Papua New Guinea Football Association) Besta United PNG
4	DF	Joshua Talau	19 April 1996 (age 29)	0	0	(Papua New Guinea Football Association) Besta United PNG
5	DF	John Ray	21 January 1997 (age 29)	0	0	(Papua New Guinea Football Association) Besta United PNG
8	DF	Sammy Rufus		0	0	
15	DF	Vincent Worio	6 December 1993 (age 32)	0	0	
16	DF	Felix Komolong	6 March 1997 (age 28)	0	0	(Papua New Guinea Football Association) Madang
6	FW	Emmanuel Airem	22 November 1994 (age 31)	0	0	(Papua New Guinea Football Association) Hekari United
7	MF	Freddy Steven	4 July 1994 (age 31)	0	0	(Papua New Guinea Football Association) Besta United PNG
10	MF	Rodney Mobiha	1 February 1994 (age 32)	0	0	(Papua New Guinea Football Association) Admiralty
12	MF	Darren Steven	4 June 1994 (age 31)	0	0	
14	MF	Alwin Komolong	2 November 1994 (age 31)	0	0	(Papua New Guinea Football Association) Madang
17	MF	Jacob Sabua	25 August 1994 (age 31)	0	0	(Papua New Guinea Football Association) Oro
18	MF	Basil Jofari	1 January 1990 (age 36)	0	0	(Papua New Guinea Football Association) FC Port Moresby
21	MF	Nathan James		0	0	(Papua New Guinea Football Association) Besta United PNG
22	MF	Gimale Essacu	31 December 1997 (age 28)	0	0	(Football Australia) Canberra City
23	MF	Papalau Awele	1 February 1995 (age 31)	0	0	(Papua New Guinea Football Association) Besta United PNG
9	FW	Patrick Aisa	6 July 1994 (age 31)	0	0	(Papua New Guinea Football Association) Oro
11	FW	Emmanuel Yawi		0	0	
13	FW	Tommy Semmy	30 September 1994 (age 31)			(Papua New Guinea Football Association) Hekari United
19	FW	Pettyshen Elijah	12 July 1993 (age 32)	0	0	(Papua New Guinea Football Association) Admiralty

== Golf ==
Women

- Margaret Lavaki
- Kristine Seko
- Hazel Martin
- Margaret Lavaki
- Roslyn Taufa

Men

- Soti Dinki
- Steven George
- Wally Ilake
- Brian Taikiri

== Karate ==
Women

- Crystal Elizabeth Raka Mari
- Dorish Karomo
- Jacklyn Barney
- Lera Kose
- Catherine Wilson
- Sarah Esther Ande
- Gantianna Joseph
- Francillia Kokin
- Joancherry Gou Revui
- Gewa Bianca Rupa
- Francillia Kokin

Men

- Cosmas Walio Saliawali
- Ishmael Stanley
- Naorei Joseph
- John Besty Kajona
- Ernest Charles Nuli
- Sailas Gabriel Piskaut
- Nigel Bana
- Vincent Quentin Bougen
- Leonard Robinson Gariadi
- Eddie Martin
- Siwari Matus
- Andrew Molen
- Dominic Sipapi

== Lawn bowls ==
Women

- Ju Melissa Carlo
- Cesley Simbinali
- Mondin Tiba
- Angela Simbinali
- Catherine Wimp

Men

- Matu Matso Bazo
- Peter Juni
- Polin Senai Pomaliu
- Lucas Roika
- Anthony Nipue Yogiyo

== Netball ==
- Lua Rikis
- Herronie Hazel Daera
- Susan Makara Wellington
- Margaret Ari Eka
- Tiata Maria Baldwin
- Jacklyn Metahera Lahari
- Shanna Jennifer Dringo
- Nerrie Adula
- Raka Nope
- Kilala Sunema Owen
- Winnie Mavara
- Jeperth Tulapi

== Outrigger canoeing ==
Women

- Rhonda Davara
- Nona Gamoga
- Christina Geno
- Vavine Guria
- Mary Holland
- Taluva Iamo
- Mauri Ila
- Noeleen Kapi
- Kone Keni
- Tegana Keto
- Hane Kevau
- Vagi Kila
- Ailima Kini
- Melissa Maino
- Gloria Ogera
- Judy Claire Ovia
- Susan Paisoi
- Evanelia Boupang Peni
- Nellie Tetaga
- Beverlyn Valina

Men

- Veari Veari
- Christopher Morea

== Powerlifting ==
Women

- Hitolo Kevau
- Navillie Benson
- Linda Pulsan
- Dobi Mea
- Belinda Umang
- Meteng Wak – disqualified (WADA).
- Melissa Tikio

Men

- Vagi Henry
- Livingstone Sokoli
- Anderson Mangela
- Kenny Naime
- Henry Kelo
- Brown Bolong
- Kalau Andrew
- Alfred Mel

== Rugby league nines ==
- Stargroth Amean
- Kato Ottio
- Gahuna Silas
- Noel Zeming
- Rex Yellon
- Adex Wera
- Willie Minoga
- Henry Noki
- Thompson Teteh
- Watson Boas
- Brandy Peter
- Oti Tony Bland
- Israel Eliab
- David Lapua
- Ase Boas
- Wartovo Puara

== Rugby sevens ==
Women

– Women's tournament.

No.	Pos.	Player	Date of birth (age)	Union / Club
1	BK	Cassandra Samson (c)	November 15, 1989 (aged 25)	National Capital District
2	BK	Alice Alois	September 28, 1996 (aged 18)	National Capital District
3	FW	Amelia Kuk	July 22, 1995 (aged 19)	Queensland
4	FW	Lynette Kwarula	July 4, 1990 (aged 25)	Central
5	BK	Trisilla Rema		New Capital District
6	BK	Dulcie Bomai		New Capital District
7	BK	Menda Ipat		National Capital District
8	BK	Freda Waula		New Capital District
9	FW	Kymlie Rapilla	May 16, 1991 (aged 24)	New Capital District
10	FW	Naomi Alapi		New Capital District
11	FW	Geua Larry		Central
12	BK	Joana Lagona	January 2, 1989 (aged 26)	New Capital District

Men

4th – Men's tournament.

No.	Pos.	Player	Date of birth (age)	Union / Club
1	BK	Henry Kalua		Papua New Guinea
2	BK	Stanis Susuve		National Capital District
3	FW	Butler Morris		Papua New Guinea
4	FW	Tisa Kautu		Papua New Guinea
5	BK	Arthur Clement		Papua New Guinea
6	BK	William Rew		Queensland
7	BK	Max Vali		Morobe
8	BK	Hensley Peter		National Capital District
9	FW	Eugene Tokavai		East New Britain
10	FW	Wesley Vali		Morobe
11	FW	Jordan Tkatchenko		Queensland
12	BK	Hubert Tseraha		Black Orchids

== Sailing ==
Women

- Rose Lee Numa
- Janet Vaa

Men

- Markson Charlie
- John Numa
- Navu Gerea Buggsy Charlie
- Boisen Numa
- Upu Navu Kila
- Harry Haro

== Shooting ==
PNG qualified 13 athletes in shooting:

Women

- Carmelita de Guzman Donald
- Beatrice Bisia Geita
- Nancy Geita
- Koiogulei Henry
- Tania Mairi – 10 m air pistol female.
- Winifred Warubele Sauna

Men

- George Nicholas Constantinou
- Angus William Donald
- Darcy Leahy
- Peter Leahy
- Sibona Mairi
- Danny Wanma
- Jason Yip

== Softball ==
- Addie Lino Amos
- Anna Dick
- Annette Maradi
- Antonia Marang Kinit
- Beverly Niaweseu Pasen
- Emma Markis
- Florence Daple
- Dhiadre Mautu
- Hennie Warpin
- Judy Nauvana
- Juliet Geredah Seri
- Lisa Polum
- Nadia Bais
- Siloru Miriam Zale
- Tara Elizaberth Tomangana
- Tahillah Fong
- Tenisha Takau Kuveu
- Encie NK Simitap
- Joyce Inguba
- Lisa Malum
- Marina Millingin
- Natasha Pilak

== Squash ==
Women

- Nicole Ravu Gibbs
- Sheila Rhonda Morove
- Lynette Vai
- Eli Webb
- Imong Brooksbank

Men

- Moreaina Wei
- Kerry Walsh
- Robin Morove
- Schubert Maketu
- Suari Madako Suari Jnr
- Lokes Brooksbank

== Swimming ==
PNG announced a team of 30 swimmers in April 2015, with the open-water team yet to be selected. The final team included 32 athletes qualified for the 2015 Games in swimming:

Men

Athlete	Event	Heat		Final	
Athlete	Event	Time	Rank	Time	Rank
Leo Biggs	50 m Freestyle	24.81	13	Did not advance	
Ryan Pini	50 m Freestyle	23.21	1 Q	23.10 GR	1st place, gold medalist(s)
Samuel Seghers	50 m Freestyle	23.55	5 Q	23.78	6
Stanford Kawale	100 m Freestyle	54.63	13	Did not advance	
Ryan Pini	100 m Freestyle	51.94	5 Q	50.63	1st place, gold medalist(s)
Samuel Seghers	100 m Freestyle	51.62	2 Q	51.53	4
Bobby Akunaii	200 m Freestyle	2:10.75	14	Did not advance	
Stanford Kawale	200 m Freestyle	2:03.74	11	Did not advance	
Samuel Seghers	200 m Freestyle	1:54.58	2 Q	1:54.09	4
Holly John	400 m Freestyle	5:02.19	14	Did not advance	
Ashton Kunda	400 m Freestyle	5:05.13	17	Did not advance	
Sheldon Plummer	400 m Freestyle	4:31.66	7 q	4:37.27	7
Ashton Kunda	1500 m Freestyle	—N/a		21:07.73	10
Sheldon Plummer	1500 m Freestyle	—N/a		18:02.31	3rd place, bronze medalist(s)
Nathan Nadesalingam	50 m Backstroke	29.79	11	Did not advance	
Ryan Pini	50 m Backstroke	26.22	1 Q	26.14	1st place, gold medalist(s)
Peter Pokawin	50 m Backstroke	30.24	12	Did not advance	
Livingstone Aika	100 m Backstroke	1:07.67	11	Did not advance	
Nathan Nadesalingam	100 m Backstroke	1:06.38	9	Did not advance	
Ryan Pini	100 m Backstroke	58.94	1 Q	56.00 GR	1st place, gold medalist(s)
Nathan Nadesalingam	200 m Backstroke	2:31.85	9 Q	2:32.50	8
Peter Pokawin	200 m Backstroke	2:32.16	10	Did not advance	
Ryan Maskelyn	50 m Breaststroke	30.23	6 Q	30.45	6
Ian Nakmai	50 m Breaststroke	30.38	8	Did not advance	
Ashley Seeto	50 m Breaststroke	30.36	7 Q	30.71	7
Shannon Liew	100 m Breaststroke	1:11.90	11	Did not advance	
Ryan Maskelyne	100 m Breaststroke	1:06.17	4 Q	1:04.78	4
Ashley Seeto	100 m Breaststroke	1:07.87	5	1:08.38	7
Leonard Kalate	200 m Breaststroke	2:38.60	9	Did not advance	
Ryan Maskelyne	200 m Breaststroke	2:25.39	1 Q	2:21.22	2nd place, silver medalist(s)
Ashley Seeto	200 m Breaststroke	2:34.19	8 Q	2:31.97	7
Ryan Pini	50 m Butterfly	24.58	1 Q	23.93 GR	1st place, gold medalist(s)
Peter Pokawin	50 m Butterfly	26.41	11	Did not advance	
Samuel Seghers	50 m Butterfly	25.51	5 Q	25.50	4
Stanford Kawale	100 m Butterfly	1:00.30	9	Did not advance	
Ryan Pini	100 m Butterfly	54.21	1 Q	53.42 GR	1st place, gold medalist(s)
Samuel Seghers	100 m Butterfly	56.09	2 Q	55.49	2nd place, silver medalist(s)
Collin Akara	200 m Butterfly	—N/a		DQ	—N/a
Bobby Akunaii	200 m Butterfly	—N/a		2:26.53	4
James Runnegar	200 m Butterfly	—N/a		2:32.85	5
Livingston Aika	200 m Individual Medley	2:34.14	14	Did not advance	
Bobby Akunaii	200 m Individual Medley	2:25.88	11 Q	2:26.46	8
Stanford Kawale	200 m Individual Medley	2:22.69	10 Q	2:21.92	7
Bobby Akunaii	400 m Individual Medley	5:28.38	8 Q	5:20.72	6
Ashton Kunda	400 m Individual Medley	5:56.41	10	Did not advance	
Samuel Seghers; Leo Biggs; Stanford Kawale; Ryan Pini	4 × 100 m Freestyle relay	—N/a		3:28.02	3rd place, bronze medalist(s)
Samuel Seghers; Stanford Kawale; Shannon Liew; Ryan Pini	4 × 200 m Freestyle relay	—N/a		8:06.45	3rd place, bronze medalist(s)
Ryan Pini; Ryan Maskelyne; Samuel Seghers; Stanford Kawale	4 × 100 m Medley relay	—N/a		3:49.53	2nd place, silver medalist(s)
Angus Dubur	5 km Open Water	—N/a		59:43:37	16
Holly John	5 km Open Water	—N/a		54:04:23	11
Tony Pryke	5 km Open Water	—N/a		54:30:39	12

Women

Athlete	Event	Heat		Final	
Athlete	Event	Time	Rank	Time	Rank
Anna-Liza Mopio-Jane	50 m Freestyle				
Savannah Tkatchenko	50 m Freestyle				
Barbara Vali-skelton	50 m Freestyle				
Anna-Liza Mopio-Jane	100 m Freestyle				
Savannah Tkatchenko	100 m Freestyle				
Barbara Vali-Skelton	100 m Freestyle				
Anna-Liza Mopio-Jane	200 m Freestyle				
Jean Koupa	200 m Freestyle				
Ebony Tkatchenko	200 m Freestyle				
Millie knight	400 m Freestyle				
Jean Koupa	400 m Freestyle				
Ebony Tkatchenko	400 m Freestyle				
Millie knight	800 m Freestyle				
Ebony Tkatchenko	800 m Freestyle				
Anna-Liza Mopio-Jane	50 m Backstroke				
Britney Murray	50 m Backstroke				
Shanice Paraka	50 m Backstroke				
Anna-Liza Mopio-Jane	100 m Backstroke				
Shanice Paraka	100 m Backstroke				
Savannah Tkatchenko	100 m Backstroke				
Anna-Liza Mopio-Jane	200 m Backstroke				
Ebony Tkatchenko	200 m Backstroke				
Savannah Tkatchenko	200 m Backstroke				
Tegan McCarthy	50 m Breaststroke				
Savannah Tkatchenko	50 m Breaststroke				
Barbara Vali-Skelton	50 m Breaststroke				
Jocelyn Flynn	100 m Breaststroke				
Savannah Tkatchenko	100 m Breaststroke				
Barbara Vali-Skelton	100 m Breaststroke				
Tegan McCarthy	200 m Breaststroke				
Savannah Tkatchenko	200 m Breaststroke				
Tegan McCarthy	50 m Butterfly				
Anna-Liza Mopio-Jane	50 m Butterfly				
Britney Murray	50 m Butterfly				
Tegan McCarthy	100 m Butterfly				
Anthea Murray	100 m Butterfly				
Georgia-Leigh Vele	100 m Butterfly				
Tegan McCarthy	200 m Butterfly				
Anthea Murray	200 m Butterfly				
Georgia-Leigh Vele	200 m Butterfly				
Ebony Tkatchenko	200 m Individual Medley				
Savannah Tkatchenko	200 m Individual Medley				
Barbara Vali-Skelton	200 m Individual Medley				
Jocelyn Flynn	400 m Individual Medley				
Jean Koupa	400 m Individual Medley				
Britney Murray	400 m Individual Medley				
Savannah Tkatchenko; Ebony Tkatchenko; Barbara Vali-Skelton; Anna-Liza Mopio-Jane	4 × 100 m Freestyle relay	—N/a		4:11.52	3rd place, bronze medalist(s)
Millie knight Jocelyn Flynn; Jean Koupa; Anna-Liza Mopio-Jane	4 × 200 m Freestyle relay	—N/a		9:12.16	3rd place, bronze medalist(s)
Shanice Paraka; Savannah Tkatchenko; Tegan McCarthy; Anna-Liza Mopio-Jane	4 × 100 m Medley relay	—N/a		4:38.31	2nd place, silver medalist(s)
	3 km Open Water	—N/a			

Mixed

Athlete	Event	Final	
Athlete	Event	Time	Rank
Anna-Liza Mopio-Jane; Samuel Seghers; Savannah Tkatchenko; Ryan Pini	4 × 50 m Freestyle relay	1:40.20 GR	1st place, gold medalist(s)
Ryan Pini; Barbara Vali-Skelton; Samuel Seghers; Anna-Liza Mopio-Jane	4 × 50 m Medley relay	1:52.04	2nd place, silver medalist(s)

== Table tennis ==
Papua New Guinea qualified 11 athletes in table tennis (including parasport events) for the 2015 Games:

Men

- Haoda Agari
- Jackson Morea Kariko
- David Rea Loi
- Geoffrey Loi
- Gasika Sepa
- David Thomas

Women

- Idau Boni Chris
- Geru Lohia
- Gagina Mape
- Dia Isi Morea
- Maryanne Robert Loi

== Taekwondo ==
PNG qualified 14 athletes in taekwondo:

Women

- Rose Tona (46 kg)
- Theresa Tona (53 kg)
- Doris David (53 kg)
- Stephanie Kombo (63 kg)
- Samantha Kassman (67 kg)
- Noelyn Hetana (67 kg)

Men

- Bobby Willie (54 kg)
- Max Kassman (63 kg)
- Rainner Peni(68 kg)
- Henry Ori (74 kg)
- Jonathan Paskalis (80 kg)
- Colland Kokin (87 kg)
- Ivan Kassman(87 kg)
- Sam Ware(87 kg)
- Steven Tommy (Reserve)(68 kg)

== Tennis ==
=== Singles ===
Event	Competitor	Round of 32	Round of 16	Quarter Final	Semi Final	Final	Rank
Event	Competitor	Opposition Results	Opposition Result	Opposition Result	Opposition Result	Opposition Result	Rank
Men	Lochlan Kitchen	(Fiji) Daneric Hazelman (FIJ); L 4–6 0–6	Did not advance				
Men	Eddie Mera	(Kiribati) Tebatibunga Tito (KIR); L 4–6 3–6	Did not advance				
Men	Matthew Stubbings	(Fiji) Devashkar Reddy (FIJ); W 6–2 6–2	(Vanuatu) Aymeric Mara (VAN); L 1–6 6–0 4–6	Did not advance			
Women	Patricia Apisah	(French Polynesia) Naia Guitton (TAH); W 6–1 6–1	(American Samoa) Kalani Soli (ASA); L 4–6 2–6	Did not advance			
Women	Violet Apisah	BYE	(Tonga) Sisilia Teu (TGA); W 6–0 6–0	(New Caledonia) Lysiane Moto (NCL); W 6–1 6–4	(New Caledonia) Yaelle Honakoko (NCL); L 3–6 7–6 4–6	(New Caledonia) Anaeve Pain (NCL); L 4–6 6–1 4–6	4
Women	Abigail Tere-Apisah	BYE	(Vanuatu) Lorraine Banimataku (VAN); W 6–1 6–0	(French Polynesia) Mayka Zima (TAH); W 6–4 6–1	(New Caledonia) Anaeve Pain (NCL); W 6–1 7–5	(New Caledonia) Yaelle Honakoko (NCL); W 6–3 2–6 7–6	Gold medal
Women	Marcia Tere-Apisah	(Solomon Islands) Vinda Teally (SOL); W 6–1 6–0	(French Polynesia) Estelle Tehau (TAH); W 6–1 6–1	(New Caledonia) Anaeve Pain (NCL); L 3–6 6–1 1–6	Did not advance		

=== Doubles ===
Event	Competitor	Round of 16	Quarter Final	Semi Final	Final	Rank
Event	Competitor	Opposition Results	Opposition Result	Opposition Result	Opposition Result	Rank
Men	Mark Gibbons; Matthew Stubbings	(Fiji) Devashkar Reddy; Raynal Singh (FIJ); W 6–4 6–4	(French Polynesia) Heve Kelly; Angelo Yersin (TAH); L 6–2 5–7 10–6	Did not advance		
Men	Lochlan Kitchen; Eddie Mera	(Vanuatu) Cyril Jacobe; Aymeric Mara (VAN); L 1–6 1–6	Did not advance			
Women	Abigail Tere-Apisah; Marcia Tere-Apisah	BYE	(American Samoa) Florence Wasko; Kalani Soli (ASA); W 6–3 6–0	(French Polynesia) Estelle Tehau; Mayka Zima (TAH); W 6–3 6–0	(Papua New Guinea) Patricia Apisah; Violet Apisah (PNG); W 6–3 6–3	Gold medal
Women	Patricia Apisah; Violet Apisah	BYE	(Solomon Islands) Vinda Teally; Geojimah Row (SOL); W 6–1 6–0	(New Caledonia) Lysiane Moto; Lindsey Nekiriai (NCL); W 6–2 4–6 14–12	(Papua New Guinea) Abigail Tere-Apisah; Marcia Tere-Apisah (PNG); L 3–6 3–6	Silver medal
Mixed	Violet Apisah; Matthew Stubbings	(Tonga) Matavao Fanguna; Kendra Paea (TGA); W 6–3 6–3	(New Caledonia) Yaelle Honakoko; Guillaume Monot (NCL); W 7–5 7–5	(New Caledonia) Nickolas Ngodrela; Anaeve Pain (NCL); W 6–3 6–2	(Papua New Guinea) Abigail Tere-Apisah; Mark Gibbons (PNG); L 3–6 5–7	Silver medal
Mixed	Patricia Apisah; Lochlan Kitchen	(New Caledonia) Julien Delaplane; Lindsey Nekiriai (NCL); L 3–6 4–6	Did not advance			
Mixed	Abigail Tere-Apisah; Mark Gibbons	(Tonga) Semisi Fanguna; Sisilia Teu (TGA); W 6–1 6–0	(American Samoa) Kevin Maukoloa; Kalani Soli (ASA); W 6–1 6–2	(New Caledonia) Julien Delaplane; Lindsey Nekiriai (NCL); W 6–3 6–3	(Papua New Guinea) Violet Apisah; Matthew Stubbings (PNG); W 6–3 7–5	Gold medal

== Touch rugby ==
Papua New Guinea qualified men's and women's teams in touch rugby (38 athletes, maximum 14 per team):

Men

– Men's tournament.

- Ronald Bibiken
- Kora Simon Kora David
- Eugene Miro Eka
- Paul Latoro Kasisie
- Harry Kea
- William Ken
- Kele Lessy
- Diallo Honasan Luana
- Paul Matuta
- Uari Sarufa Saea
- Bobby Vavona
- Samuel Henao Vetu
- Elison Waluka
- Francis Alu
- Jerry Borg
- Philip Frank
- Fitzerald Jee
- Charlie Rupa
- Marlon Heistar Steven
- Norman Vavona
- Morris Walter

Women

– Women's tournament.

- Maria Alu
- Pauline Margaret Arazi
- Patiyoko Apiganasa Bernard
- Jenny Carol
- Grace Angela Harriette Kouba
- Natalie Naomi Kuper
- Margaret Luke
- Marie Max Tuu
- Nadya Taubuso
- Monica Teite
- Joylyne Tikot
- Diane Vetu
- Angelena Watego
- Vavine Markie Yore
- Rose Eva
- Doris Koraea
- Velma Tsang

== Triathlon ==
Women

- Rosemary Arua Ralfe
- Rachel Sapery James

Men

- Mairi Karl Feeger
- Casmer Kapali Kamangip
- Troy David Kua

== Volleyball ==
Women

- Zoe Stella Sarea Awadu
- Kemmy Manoni
- Clear Vele
- Leontine Tina Ono
- Jayna Bernard
- Aileen Gima
- Perpetua Awadu
- Isa Hicks
- Emily Afali Bae
- Luana Travertz
- Michelle Shirley Walo
- Lois Garena
- Bibina Sina Paloa

Men

== Weightlifting ==
Papua New Guinea entered 15 weightlifters (8 men and 7 women) in 13 categories. The athletes won a total of 21 medals, 13 of them gold.

Men

Athlete	Event	Snatch	Rank	Clean & Jerk	Rank	Total	Rank
Raygori Lolo	56 kg	75	7	108	4	183	5
Andrew Sire	56 kg	78	4	107	5	185	4
Morea Baru	62 kg	121	1st place, gold medalist(s)	155	2nd place, silver medalist(s)	276	1st place, gold medalist(s)
Ignatius Morea	69 kg	95	12	105	12	200	13
Fred Oala	69 kg	110	5	154	3rd place, bronze medalist(s)	264	4
Toua Udia	77 kg	130	2nd place, silver medalist(s)	172	1st place, gold medalist(s)	302	1st place, gold medalist(s)
Matagu Gaba	85 kg	115	9	152	7	267	7
Steven Kari	94 kg	140	2nd place, silver medalist(s)	204	1st place, gold medalist(s)	344	1st place, gold medalist(s)

Women

Athlete	Event	Snatch	Rank	Clean & Jerk	Rank	Total	Rank
Thelma Toua	48 kg	70	1st place, gold medalist(s)	90	1st place, gold medalist(s)	160	1st place, gold medalist(s)
Dika Toua	53 kg	NL	—N/a	110	1st place, gold medalist(s)	110	6
Doreen Ovia	58 kg	60	6	80	5	140	5
Sandra Ako	63 kg	80	3rd place, bronze medalist(s)	103	1st place, gold medalist(s)	183	2nd place, silver medalist(s)
Guba Hale	69 kg	83	1st place, gold medalist(s)	105	2nd place, silver medalist(s)	188	1st place, gold medalist(s)
Eden Kambi	75 kg	83	3rd place, bronze medalist(s)	100	4	183	4
Loraine Harry	+75 kg	83	7	107	6	190	6
