= Athletics at the 2015 Pacific Games =

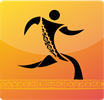
- Athletics pictogram for the Games
- Dates: July 13–18
- Host city: Port Moresby, Papua New Guinea
- Venue: Sir John Guise Stadium
- Level: Senior
- Events: 48 (including 4 para events)
- Participation: 273 athletes from 20 nations
- Records set: 6 games records

Athletics at the 2015 Pacific Games was held in Port Moresby, Papua New Guinea on July 13–18, 2015. Four parasport events were also included.

== Participating nations ==
Twenty countries competed at the 2015 Pacific Games in athletics:

- Cook Islands (2)
- Federated States of Micronesia (6)
- Fiji (40)
- Guam (1)
- Kiribati (6)
- Marshall Islands (1)
- Nauru (11)
- New Caledonia (42)
- Niue (1)
- Norfolk Island (1)
- Northern Mariana Islands (2)
- Palau (5)
- Papua New Guinea (69)
- Samoa (6)
- Solomon Islands (15)
- Tahiti (25)
- Tonga (18)
- Tuvalu (6)
- Vanuatu (14)
- Wallis and Futuna (2)

Note: The number of athletes registered for the 2015 Pacific Games to represent each country is shown in brackets.

== Medal summary ==
=== Medal table ===
* Host nation (Papua New Guinea)

Rank	Nation	Gold	Silver	Bronze	Total
1	Papua New Guinea (PNG)*	23	21	18	62
2	New Caledonia (NCL)	10	12	10	32
3	Fiji (FIJ)	7	6	7	20
4	Solomon Islands (SOL)	4	2	1	7
5	Tahiti (TAH)	2	1	6	9
6	Samoa (SAM)	1	2	3	6
7	Cook Islands (COK)	1	1	0	2
8	Wallis and Futuna (WLF)	0	1	1	2
9	Norfolk Island (NFK)	0	1	0	1
9	Palau (PLW)	0	1	0	1
11	Tonga (TGA)	0	0	2	2
Totals (11 entries)		48	48	48	144

=== Men's results ===
Event	Gold		Silver		Bronze		Refs
100 m	Banuve Tabakaucoro (FIJ)	10.55	Rodman Teltull (PLW)	10.98	Kupun Wisil (PNG)	11.04	
100 m Ambulant	Sylvain Bova (NCL)	12.34 (F/T11)	Francis Kompaon (PNG)	11.87 (T46)	Samuel Nason (PNG)	12.24 (T46)	
200 m	Banuve Tabakaucoro (FIJ)	20.53 GR	Nelson Stone (PNG)	21.28	Theo Piniau (PNG)	21.37	
400 m	Nelson Stone (PNG)	47.56	Theo Piniau (PNG)	48.08	Kaminiel Matlaun (PNG)	48.43	
800 m	Kaminiel Matlaun (PNG)	1:53.85	Adrien Kela (NCL)	1:53.87	Martin Orovo (PNG)	1:57.24	
1500 m	Adrien Kela (NCL)	4:19.00	George Yamak (PNG)	4:19.38	Martin Orovo (PNG)	4:20.21	
5000 m	Nordine Benfodda (NCL)	15:54.55	Rosefelo Siosi (SOL)	15:58.04	Loïc Mevel (TAH)	15:59.06	
10000 m	Rosefelo Siosi (SOL)	33:06.03	Nordine Benfodda (NCL)	33:24.22	Kupsy Bisamo (PNG)	33:31.53	
Half Marathon	Kupsy Bisamo (PNG)	1:14:11	Georges Richmond (TAH)	1:14:23	Avikash Lal (FIJ)	1:15:07	
110 m Hurdles	Wala Gime (PNG)	14.80	Mowen Boino (PNG)	14.94	Tutaia Galoiola (SAM)	15.50	
400 m Hurdles	Mowen Boino (PNG)	52.51	Peniel Joshua (PNG)	53.14	Wala Gime (PNG)	53.70	
3000 m Steeplechase	Sapolai Yao (PNG)	9:38.89	Skene Kiage (PNG)	9:47.80	Ashneel Nand (FIJ)	9:57.08	
4 × 100 m Relay	Papua New Guinea; Theo Piniau; Nelson Stone; Wesley Logorava; Kupun Wisil	40.62	Fiji; Albert Miller Jr; Vilisoni Rarasea; Aaron Powell; Banuve Tabakaucoro	41.06	New Caledonia; Thomas Kartotaroeno; Frédéric Erin; Eric Creugnet; Davd Alexandrine	42.90	
4 × 400 m Relay	Papua New Guinea; Mowen Boino; Kaminiel Matlaun; Theo Piniau; Nelson Stone	3:13.86	Fiji; Anasa Kaito; Ratutira Narara; Vilisoni Rarasea; Banuve Tabakaucoro	3:15.35	Solomon Islands; Moses Ohai'ihi; Alwin Muha; Mathew Sukulu; Emmanuel Tautaumae	3:28.32	
Long Jump	Raihau Maiau (TAH)	8.14m +4.5	Frédéric Erin (NCL)	7.78m +4.9	Idau Asigau (PNG)	7.32m +2.7	
Triple Jump	Eugene Vollmer (FIJ)	15.27m	Peniel Richard (PNG)	15.22m	Frédéric Erin (NCL)	14.97m	
High Jump	Rajendra Prasad (FIJ)	2.03m	Ogun Robert (NCL)	2.03m	Sailasa Kalouniviti (FIJ)	1.97m	
Pole Vault	Éric Reuillard (NCL)	4.60m	Karo Iga (PNG)	3.85m	Jean-Bernard Harper (NCL)	3.80m	
Shot Put	Tumatai Dauphin (TAH)	19.14m	Alexander Rose (SAM)	16.58m	Mustafa Fall (FIJ)	15.78m NR	
Shot Put Secured	Thierry Cibone (NCL)	9.37m (F/34)	Marcelin Walico (NCL)	10.23m (F/57)	Christian Chee Ayee (TAH)	8.38m (F56)	
Discus Throw	Alex Rose (SAM)	56.40m	Debono Paraka (PNG)	47.13m	Erwan Cassier (NCL)	45.01m	
Hammer Throw	Erwan Cassier (NCL)	61.52m	Alexander Rose (SAM)	58.66m NR	Eutesio Toto (NCL)	55.96m	
Javelin Throw	Leslie Copeland (FIJ)	70.31	Vahaafenua Tipotio (WLF)	65.41	Erwan Cassier (NCL)	61.14	
Javelin Ambulant	Sent Anis (PNG)	38.25m (F42)	Thierry Washetine (NCL)	47.80m (F/T20)	Lutovico Halagahu (WLF)	41.34m (F44)	
Decathlon	Robson Yinambe (PNG)	6,288	Lilian Garçon (NCL)	6,182	Soape Polutele (TGA)	5,102	

=== Women's results ===
Event	Gold		Silver		Bronze		Refs
100 m	Toea Wisil (PNG)	11.86	Younis Bese (FIJ)	12.27	Sisilia Seavula (FIJ)	12.55	
200 m	Toea Wisil (PNG)	24.05	Younis Bese (FIJ)	25.21	Sisilia Seavula (FIJ)	25.41	
400 m	Toea Wisil (PNG)	54.17	Donna Koniel (PNG)	54.29	Betty Burua (PNG)	55.21	
800 m	Donna Koniel (PNG)	2:12.78	Jenny Albert (PNG)	2:15.79	Solenne Kerleguer (NCL)	2:20.68	
1500 m	Miriam Goiye (PNG)	4:45.44	Jenny Albert (PNG)	4:45.47	Poro Gahekave (PNG)	4:51.72	
5000 m	Sharon Firisua (SOL)	18:20.09 GR, NR	Rama Kumilgo (PNG)	18:23.83	Ongan Awa (PNG)	18:24.48	
10000 m	Sharon Firisua (SOL)	38:33.04 NR	Ongan Awa (PNG)	39:07.97	Elodie Menou (TAH)	39:32.38	
Half Marathon	Sharon Firisua (SOL)	1:29:26 NR	Dianah Matekali (SOL)	1:30:24	Miriam Goiye (PNG)	1:31:22	
100 m Hurdles	Sharon Kwarula (PNG)	14.40	Lucie Turpin (NCL)	14.53	Manuella Gavin (NCL)	14.68	
400 m Hurdles	Donna Koniel (PNG)	58.28 GR	Sharon Kwarula (PNG)	60.17	Ana Baleveicau (FIJ)	61.89	
3000 m Steeplechase	Rama Kumilgo (PNG)	11:26.51	Poro Gahekave (PNG)	11:31.66	Heiata Brinkfield (TAH)	12:01.09	
4 × 100 m Relay	Fiji; Sisilia Seavula; Makelesi Tumalevu; Elenoa Sailosi; Younis Bese	46.17	Papua New Guinea; Miriam Peni; Toea Wisil; Adrine Monagi; Sharon Kwarula	46.27	New Caledonia; Jeanne Watha; Fiona Wawasse; Manuella Gavin; Esther Wejieme	49.53	
4 × 400 m Relay	Papua New Guinea; Sharon Kwarula; Donna Koniel; Afure Adah; Toea Wisil	3:45.13	Fiji; Makereta Naulu; Elenani Tinai; Adi Rayawa; Ana Baleveicau	3:46.26	New Caledonia; Esther Wejieme; Solenne Kerleguer; Gaelle Rossignol; Peggy Paulmin	4:10.22	
Long Jump	Rellie Kaputin (PNG)	5.97m NR	Adrine Monagi (PNG)	5.76m	Helen Philemon (PNG)	5.64m	
Triple Jump	Rellie Kaputin (PNG)	12.65m NR	Milika Tuivanuavou (FIJ)	12.05m	Annie Topal (PNG)	11.99m	
High Jump	Rellie Kaputin (PNG)	1.77m NR	Naomi Kerari (PNG)	1.67m	Delilah Kami (PNG)	1.64m	
Pole Vault	Pascale Gacon (NCL)	3.70 m GR	Keona Legoff (NCL)	2.80 m	Teumere Tepea (TAH)	2.70 m	
Shot Put	Miliki Tuivanuavou (FIJ)	14.59 m	Tereapii Tapoki (COK)	14.31 m	ʻAta Maama Tuutafaiva (TGA)	13.03 m	
Shot Put Ambulant	Rose Welepa (NCL)	11.07m (F/12)	Regina Edward (PNG)	8.83m	Vero Paul Nime (PNG)	6.42m	
Discus Throw	Tereapii Tapoki (COK)	48.70m	Anastasia Takosi (NCL)	41.49m	Kasandra Vegas (SAM)	40.23m	
Hammer Throw	Elise Takosi (NCL)	52.51m GR	Brianna Stephens (NFK)	42.77m	Kasandra Vegas (SAM)	41.99m	
Javelin Throw	Linda Selui (NCL)	47.72m	Bina Ramesh (NCL)	46.32m	Gwoelani Patu (TAH)	41.99m	
Heptathlon	Adrine Monagi (PNG)	5,019	Lucie Turpin (NCL)	4,832	Helen Philemon (PNG)	4,451	

== See also ==
- Athletics at the Pacific Games
