= 2014 Oceania Athletics Championships =

XIV Oceania Athletics Championships
- Dates: June 24–26
- Host city: Avarua, Rarotonga, Cook Islands
- Venue: BCI Stadium
- Level: Senior
- Events: 39 (19 men, 19 women, 1 mixed)
- Participation: 155 athletes from 21 nations

The 2014 Oceania Athletics Championships were held at the BCI Stadium in Avarua, Rarotonga, Cook Islands, between June 24–26, 2014. The event was held jointly with the 2014 Oceania Junior Athletics Championships, and there were also exhibition events for masters, and athletes with a disability (parasports). Detailed reports on a day by day basis were given.

In the senior category, a total of 39 events were contested, 19 by men, 19 by women and 1 mixed medley relay.

== Medal summary ==
Complete results can be found on the Oceania Athletics Association webpage.

=== Men ===
Event	Gold		Silver		Bronze	
100 metres (wind: -0.2 m/s)	Banuve Tabakaucoro; Fiji	10.30 CR	Kupun Wisil; Papua New Guinea	10.80	Eddie Herene Magele; Samoa	10.85
200 metres (wind: +2.3 m/s)	Nelson Stone; Papua New Guinea	21.24 w	Theo Piniau; Papua New Guinea	21.79 w	David Elliott; New Zealand	22.52 w
400 metres	Theo Piniau; Papua New Guinea	48.89	Siologa Viliamu; Samoa	49.93	Leigh Bennett; Australia	50.41
800 metres	Tom Fawthorpe; Australia	1:51.23	Kaminiel Matlaun; Papua New Guinea	1:52.81	Epeli Batisila; Fiji	1:54.66
1500 metres	Tom Fawthorpe; Australia	3:54.55	Napu Castro; Guam	4:21.13	Thomas Briggs; Australia	4:22.68
5000 metres	Hamish MacDonald; Australia	15:55.88	Scott Mitchell; Australia	16:27.89	Jesen Kelep; Marshall Islands	20:47.14
10000 metres	Hamish MacDonald; Australia	33:22.40	Roland Neurerer; Cook Islands	39:16.87		
110 metres hurdles (wind: -2.2 m/s)	Wala Gime; Papua New Guinea	14.80	Tyler Heron; Australia	15.47		
400 metres hurdles	Leigh Bennett; Australia	52.52	Wala Gime; Papua New Guinea	53.47	Siologa Viliamu; Samoa	57.83
High jump	Jason Strano; Australia	2.00m	James Jeffery; Australia	1.94m	Peniel Richard; Papua New Guinea	1.87m
Long jump	Tim McGuire; Australia	7.58m w (wind: +2.4 m/s)	Dausoko Waisale; Fiji	7.22m (wind: +1.4 m/s)	Brandon Clark; Australia	6.95m w (wind: +3.2 m/s)
Triple jump	Eugene Vollmer; Fiji	15.60m w (wind: +2.3 m/s)	Tim McGuire; Australia	14.99m (wind: +1.8 m/s)	Patrick Hou; Papua New Guinea	13.90m w (wind: +2.9 m/s)
Shot put	Jacko Gill; New Zealand	20.70m CR	Emanuele Tusitatino; Samoa	18.49m	Dale Pritchard; New Zealand	16.07m
Discus throw	Dale Pritchard; New Zealand	47.76m	Emanuele Tusitatino; Samoa	41.77m	Brody James; Australia	40.68m
Hammer throw	Emanuele Tusitatino; Samoa	45.33m	Dale Pritchard; New Zealand	35.98m	Shaka Sola; Samoa	34.23m
Javelin throw	Leslie Copeland; Fiji	70.66m	John Crandell; Australia	64.51m		
Octathlon	Viliami Siale; Tonga	4852 pts	Cletus Mosi; Papua New Guinea	4579 pts	Robson Yinambe; Papua New Guinea	4280 pts
4 x 100 metres relay	Fiji; Eugene Vollmer; Apolosi Ratumudu; Lepani Naivalu; Banuve Tabakaucoro	41.61	Papua New Guinea; Ruwan Gunasinghe; Wala Gime; Junior Saio Avefa; Kupun Wisil	42.18	Tonga; Li'ekina Kaufusi; Peauope Suli Fifita; Siueni Filimone; Heamatangi Tuivai	42.35
4 x 400 metres relay	Papua New Guinea; Kaminiel Matlaun; Wala Gime; Peniel Joshua; Theo Piniau	3:16.72	Fiji; Banuve Tabakaucoro; Epeli Batisila; Apolosi Ratumudu; Batinisavu Uluiyata	3:19.13	Vanuatu; Bernard Kapalu; Paul Wilson Nalau; Dicky Terry Mael; George Molisingi	3:34.61

=== Women ===
Event	Gold		Silver		Bronze	
100 metres (wind: +0.7 m/s)	Toea Wisil; Papua New Guinea	11.57 CR	Younis Bese; Fiji	12.24	Patricia Taea; Cook Islands	12.34
200 metres (wind: +2.2 m/s)	Younis Bese; Fiji	25.04 w	Alexandra Bartholomew; Australia	25.16 w	Kayla Montagner; Australia	25.60 w
400 metres	Alexandra Bartholomew; Australia	55.56	Alicia Keir; Australia	55.84	Donna Koniel; Papua New Guinea	56.57
800 metres	Alicia Keir; Australia	2:16.10	Donna Koniel; Papua New Guinea	2:18.52		
5000 metres	Sharon Firisua; Solomon Islands	18:59.07	Elodie Mevel; French Polynesia	19:38.21	Louise Michelle Wittwer; Cook Islands	27:28.42
10000 metres	Sharon Firisua; Solomon Islands	39:06.25 CR	Elodie Mevel; French Polynesia	40:21.00		
3000 metres steeplechase	Nikki Hiscock; Australia	11:56.02	Cassie Dege; Australia	12:09.87		
100 metres hurdles (wind: -2.6 m/s)	Sharon Kwarula; Papua New Guinea	14.43	Kimberley Watton; Australia	14.54	Helen Philemon; Papua New Guinea	15.81
400 metres hurdles	Sharon Kwarula; Papua New Guinea	59.82	Lauren McAdam; Australia	61.95	Donna Koniel; Papua New Guinea	62.06
High jump	Anna Staib; Australia	1.63m	Rellie Kaputin; Papua New Guinea	1.57m	Mihiatea Gooding; French Polynesia	1.54m
Long jump	Catherine Hannell; Australia	5.58m w (wind: +4.5 m/s)	Rellie Kaputin; Papua New Guinea	5.56m w (wind: +3.3 m/s)	Helen Philemon; Papua New Guinea	5.32m w (wind: +4.1 m/s)
Triple jump	Anna Thomson; New Zealand	11.81m (wind: +0.0 m/s)	Atipa Mabonga; New Zealand	11.38m (wind: +0.0 m/s)	Rellie Kaputin; Papua New Guinea	11.35m (wind: +1.3 m/s)
Shot put	ʻAta Maama Tuutafaiva; Tonga	13.64m	Rebecca Direen; Australia	12.91m	Brianna Bortolanza; Australia	12.19m
Discus throw	Ariana Blackwood; New Zealand	41.44m	Atanasia Takosi; New Caledonia	40.07m	Kasandra Vegas; Samoa	36.27m
Hammer throw	Jacinta Faint; Australia	49.00m	Rebecca Direen; Australia	48.97m	Kasandra Vegas; Samoa	46.74m
Javelin throw	Eunice Steven; Papua New Guinea	34.96m	Samantha Lockington; Cook Islands	34.09m		
Heptathlon	Elana Withnall; Australia	4329 pts	Eunice Steven; Papua New Guinea	4203 pts	Ariana Blackwood; New Zealand	3586 pts
4 x 100 metres relay	Papua New Guinea; Helen Philemon; Toea Wisil; Donna Koniel; Sharon Kwarula	47.88	Australia; Kimberley Watton; Alexandra Bartholomew; Alicia Keir; Elana Withnall	48.98	(Northern Territory) / (Queensland) North Australia; Catherine Hannell; Ashleigh Jones; Sarah Busby; Kayla Montagner	49.26
4 x 400 metres relay	Australia; Lauren McAdam; Nikki Hiscock; Alexandra Bartholomew; Alicia Keir	3:51.49	Papua New Guinea; Donna Koniel; Raylyne Kanam; Eunice Steven; Sharon Kwarula	3:59.52		

=== Mixed ===
Event	Gold		Silver		Bronze	
Mixed 800m sprint medley relay	Australia; Kimberley Watton; Nicholas Bate; Georgia Winkcup; Joshua Kentwell	1:41.11	Papua New Guinea; Helen Philemon; Junior Saio Avefa; Donna Koniel; Wala Gime	1:41.17	New Zealand; Rosie Elliott; David Elliott; Georgia Hulls; Dhruv Raman	1:41.41

== Medal table (unofficial) ==
* Host nation (Cook Islands)

Rank	Nation	Gold	Silver	Bronze	Total
1	Australia	13	12	4	29
2	Papua New Guinea	9	12	8	29
3	Fiji	5	3	1	9
4	New Zealand	4	2	4	10
5	(Northern Territory) / (Queensland) North Australia	3	1	3	7
6	Tonga	2	0	1	3
7	Solomon Islands	2	0	0	2
8	Samoa	1	3	5	9
9	Cook Islands*	0	2	2	4
10	French Polynesia	0	2	1	3
11	Guam	0	1	0	1
11	New Caledonia	0	1	0	1
13	Marshall Islands	0	0	1	1
13	Vanuatu	0	0	1	1
Totals (14 entries)		39	39	31	109

== Participation ==
According to an unofficial count, 155 athletes from 21 countries participated in the senior category. As in the years before, there was also a "Regional Australia Team" (dubbed "RAT" in the results list) including athletes with "their normal place of residence in Northern Australia (defined as comprising the Northern Territory and any parts of Western Australia and Queensland, north of 26th parallel south latitude)."

- Australia (28)
- Cook Islands (10)
- Fiji (9)
- French Polynesia (6)
- Guam (7)
- Kiribati (4)
- Marshall Islands (1)
- Federated States of Micronesia (1)
- Nauru (6)
- New Caledonia (1)
- New Zealand (11)
- Niue (4)
- Norfolk Island (1)
- (Northern Territory) / (Queensland) North Australia (17)
- Northern Mariana Islands (1)
- Palau (5)
- Papua New Guinea (21)
- Samoa (5)
- Solomon Islands (5)
- Tonga (7)
- Vanuatu (5)
