= 2015 Oceania Athletics Championships =

XV Oceania Athletics Championships
- Dates: May 8–10
- Host city: Cairns, Australia
- Venue: Barlow Park
- Level: Senior
- Events: 47
- Participation: 215 + 2 guest athletes from 20 + 2 nations

The 2015 Oceania Athletics Championships were held at Barlow Park in Cairns, Australia, between May 8–10, 2015. The event was held jointly with the 2015 Oceania Youth Athletics Championships and the 2015 Oceania Combined Events Championships. Moreover, there were also exhibition events for masters and athletes with a disability (parasports), as well as school events for age groups 5 to 15 years. Detailed reports on a day by day basis were given.

Initially, a total of 48 events were scheduled. However, results for women's pole vault could not be retrieved. The event was most probably cancelled resulting in a total of 47 contested events, 24 by men, 22 by women, and 1 mixed.

== Medal summary ==
Complete results can be found on the Oceania Athletics Association webpage.

=== Men ===
Event	Gold		Silver		Bronze	
100 metres (wind: -0.1 m/s)	Banuve Tabakaucoro; Fiji	10.22 CR	Jeremy Dodson; Samoa	10.36	Michael Konomamyi; Australia	10.71
200 metres (wind: +1.6 m/s)	Jeremy Dodson; Samoa	20.57 CR	Banuve Tabakaucoro; Fiji	20.68	Michael Goldie; New Zealand	21.46
400 metres	Uluiyata Batinisavu; Fiji	48.22	Jayden Barmby; Australia	48.69	Nelson Stone; Papua New Guinea	49.27
800 metres	Sam Russell; Australia	1:54.02	Martin Orovo; Papua New Guinea	1:57.12	Veherney Babob; Papua New Guinea	1:58.11
1500 metres^{1.)}	Sam Russell; Australia	4:05.76	Martin Orovo; Papua New Guinea	4:08.06	Skene Kiage; Papua New Guinea	4:12.23
5000 metres	Joshua Torley; Australia	15:34.31	Sapolai Yao; Papua New Guinea	15:44.47	Anthony Craig (Northern Territory) / (Queensland) Northern Australia	16:15.42
10,000 metres	Matthew Dryden; New Zealand	34:18.41	Loïc Mevel; French Polynesia	34:32.18	Rosefelo Siosi; Solomon Islands	37:00.71
3000 metres steeplechase	Sapolai Yao; Papua New Guinea	9:39.74	Harry Ewing; New Zealand	9:50.68	Skene Kiage; Papua New Guinea	9:50.99
110 metres hurdles (wind: +1.4 m/s)	Jack Conway; Australia	14.40	Cedric Dubler; Australia	14.72	Mowen Boino; Papua New Guinea	14.92
400 metres hurdles	Michael Cochrane; New Zealand	50.69 CR	Mowen Boino; Papua New Guinea	52.19	Alexander Schaffer; Australia	53.01
High jump	John Dodds (Northern Territory) / (Queensland) Northern Australia	2.15m	Jason Strano; Australia	2.15m	Matt Nicholls; New Zealand	2.10m
Pole vault^{2.)}	Triston Vincent (Northern Territory) / (Queensland) Northern Australia	4.10m			Peniel Richard; Papua New Guinea	3.60m
Long jump	Waisale Dausoko; Fiji	7.51m w (wind: +4.5 m/s)	Tim McGuire; Australia	7.47m (wind: +1.4 m/s)	Idau Asigau; Papua New Guinea	6.64m w (wind: +2.5 m/s)
Triple jump	Tim McGuire; Australia	14.97m w (wind: +5.0 m/s)	Alex Ypinazar (Northern Territory) / (Queensland) Northern Australia	14.88m w (wind: +2.6 m/s)	Peniel Richard; Papua New Guinea	14.81m w (wind: +3.4 m/s)
Shot put	Alexander Rose; Samoa	16.89m	Albert Karo (Northern Territory) / (Queensland) Northern Australia	13.53m	Joseph Dabana; Nauru	13.11m
Discus throw	Alexander Rose; Samoa	60.95m CR	Marshall Hall; New Zealand	59.87m	Justin Andre; Guam	41.55m
Hammer throw	Warren Button; New Zealand	58.14m	Alexander Rose; Samoa	53.29m	Justin Andre; Guam	48.29m
Javelin throw	John Crandell; Australia	64.35m	Liam Spannenburg (Northern Territory) / (Queensland) Northern Australia	55.85m	Mahio Patu; French Polynesia	54.09m
Octathlon	Siologa Viliamu; Samoa	4395				
Decathlon	Brent Newdick; New Zealand	7140	Aaron Booth; New Zealand	6183	Alex Mander; New Zealand	5919
5000 metres walk	Jarad Free; New Zealand	24:18.39	Ignacio Jimenez (Australia) Australian Masters Athletics	25:09.28		
10,000 metres walk	Jarad Free; New Zealand	46:17.0 (ht)	Ignacio Jimenez (Australia) Australian Masters Athletics	51:29.0 (ht)		
4 × 100 metres relay	Fiji; Waisale Dausoko; Vilisoni Rarasea; Uluiyata Batinisavu; Banuve Tabakaucoro	40.98	Papua New Guinea; Charles Livuan; Nazmie-Lee Marai; Nelson Stone; Wesley Logorava	41.70	Australia; Benjamin Hayward; Jack Conway; John Crandell; Michael Konomamyi	41.86
4 × 400 metres relay	Australia; Alexander Schaffer; Sam Russell; Matthew Crowe; Jayden Barmby	3:15.55	Fiji; Banuve Tabakaucoro; Shane Tuvusa; Poasa Satoqi; Uluiyata Batinisavu	3:22.16	New Zealand; Harry Ewing; Jonty Morrison; Alex Mander; Matthew Dryden	3:32.77

^{1.)} In the 1500m event, George Yamak, Papua New Guinea, finished 3rd in 4:11.07 competing as a guest.
^{2.)} The pole vault event was won by Peter Hollenbeck, Athletics North Queensland, Australia, in 4.50m competing as a guest.

=== Women ===
Event	Gold		Silver		Bronze	
100 metres (wind: +2.9 m/s)	Toea Wisil; Papua New Guinea	11.41 w	Christine Wearne; Australia	11.52 w	Younis Bese; Fiji	11.89 w
200 metres (wind: +0.5 m/s)	Toea Wisil; Papua New Guinea	23.71 CR	Betty Burua; Papua New Guinea	23.74	Louise Jones; New Zealand	24.22
400 metres	Betty Burua; Papua New Guinea	54.32	Louise Jones; New Zealand	54.63	Donna Koniel; Papua New Guinea	54.89
800 metres	Donna Koniel; Papua New Guinea	2:09.58	Holly Campbell; Australia	2:12.17	Talia Horgan; New Zealand	2:15.24
1500 metres	Coreena Cleland; Australia	4:27.36 CR	Holly Campbell; Australia	4:29.25	Maudie Skyring; Australia	4:46.76
5000 metres	Sharon Firisua; Solomon Islands	18:35.51	Ongan Awa; Papua New Guinea	18:55.39	Mary Kua; Papua New Guinea	19:23.09
10,000 metres	Mary Kua; Papua New Guinea	40:39.52	Miriam Goiye; Papua New Guinea	40:57.79		
3000 metres steeplechase	Rama Kumilgo; Papua New Guinea	11:10.48 CR	Coreena Cleland; Australia	11:20.89	Sharon Firisua; Solomon Islands	11:27.42
100 metres hurdles (wind: +0.5 m/s)	Fiona Morrison; New Zealand	13.57	Lucie Turpin; New Caledonia	14.44	Emma Walker; New Zealand	15.15
400 metres hurdles	Betty Burua; Papua New Guinea	59.10	Lauren McAdam; Australia	62.55	Lucie Turpin; New Caledonia	65.76
High jump	Ashleigh Reid; Australia	1.80m CR	Kimberley Jenner (Northern Territory) / (Queensland) Northern Australia	1.75m	Abigail Rothery; Australia	1.75m
Pole vault	Most probably cancelled					
Long jump	Catherine Hannell (Northern Territory) / (Queensland) Northern Australia	5.82m w (wind: +3.7 m/s)	Ashleigh Jones (Northern Territory) / (Queensland) Northern Australia	5.64m w (wind: +4.6 m/s)	Helen Philemon; Papua New Guinea	5.59m w (wind: +3.0 m/s)
Triple jump	Milika Tuivanuavou; Fiji	12.29m w (wind: +3.3 m/s)	Atipa Mabonga; New Zealand	11.98m (wind: +2.0 m/s)	Alexandra Kanowski (Northern Territory) / (Queensland) Northern Australia	11.95m w (wind: +2.3 m/s)
Shot put	Milika Tuivanuavou; Fiji	14.35m	Patsy Mckenzie; Samoa	13.83m	ʻAta Maama Tuutafaiva; Tonga	13.65m
Discus throw	Siositina Hakeai; New Zealand	56.06m	Tereapii Tapoki; Cook Islands	50.83m	Adrienne Worth (Northern Territory) / (Queensland) Northern Australia	43.20m
Hammer throw	Kaysanne Hockey; Australia	54.01m	Laura Herbert; Australia	50.29m	Kasandra Vegas; Samoa	45.59m
Javelin throw	Laura Overton; New Zealand	45.87m	Patsy Mckenzie; Samoa	45.05m	Tianah List; Australia	41.52m
Heptathlon	Sarah Wood (Northern Territory) / (Queensland) Northern Australia	5052	Tori West (Northern Territory) / (Queensland) Northern Australia	4841	Merissa Colledge (Northern Territory) / (Queensland) Northern Australia	4186
5000 metres walk	Zoe Hunt; Australia	25:28.75	Jayde Hill; Australia	27:41.22		
10,000 metres walk	Zoe Hunt; Australia	50:21.0 (ht)				
4 × 100 metres relay	Papua New Guinea; Toea Wisil; Betty Burua; Helen Philemon; Miriam Peni	46.31	Australia; Tess Nelson; Lauren O'Sullivan; Kiara Chambers; Christine Wearne	46.87	New Zealand; Emma Walker; Louise Jones; Livvy Wilson; Fiona Morrison	47.34
4 × 400 metres relay	Papua New Guinea; Betty Burua; Donna Koniel; Tuna Tine; Miriam Peni	3:52.66	Australia; Lauren McAdam; Maudie Skyring; Coreena Cleland; Beth Vanderwaal	3:53.99	New Zealand; Louise Jones; Olivia Bryce; Livvy Wilson; Talia Horgan	3:55.55

=== Mixed ===
Event	Gold		Silver		Bronze	
Mixed 800m sprint medley relay	Fiji; Younis Bese; Banuve Tabakaucoro; Sisilia Seavula; Uluiyata Batinisavu	1:35.32	Papua New Guinea; Betty Burua; Nazmie-Lee Marai; Toea Wisil; Peniel Joshua	1:36.08	Australia; Christine Wearne; Michael Konomamyi; Ashleigh Reid; Alexander Moore	1:40.12

=== Masters (exhibition) ===
Event	Gold		Silver		Bronze
Mixed 1500 metres Race Walk	Ignacio Jimenez	9:36.99	Lynne Schickert	11:01.75	

== Medal table (unofficial) ==
* Host nation (Australia)

Rank	Nation	Gold	Silver	Bronze	Total
1	Australia*	12	13	7	32
2	Papua New Guinea	10	9	11	30
3	New Zealand	9	5	9	23
4	Fiji	7	2	1	10
5	(Northern Territory) / (Queensland) Northern Australia	4	6	4	14
6	Samoa	4	4	1	9
7	Solomon Islands	1	0	2	3
8	(Australia) Australian Masters Athletics	0	2	0	2
9	French Polynesia	0	1	1	2
9	New Caledonia	0	1	1	2
11	Cook Islands	0	1	0	1
12	Guam	0	0	2	2
13	Nauru	0	0	1	1
13	Tonga	0	0	1	1
Totals (14 entries)		47	44	41	132

== Participation (unofficial) ==
According to an unofficial count, 215 athletes (+ 2 guests) from 20 countries and territories participated. There were two additional teams: one athlete represented Australian Masters Athletics (dubbed "AMA" in the result lists). As in the years before, there was also a "Regional Australia Team" Northern Australia (dubbed "RAT" in the results list) comprising Australian athletes who "either have their normal place of residence (defined as being a place where an athlete is resident and/or educated) in an "athletically remote area" of Australia (defined as a being a place more than 300 km from any centre at which track and field competition is held on a regular basis i.e. basically weekly or fortnightly during the track season) or "Northern Australia" (defined as comprising the Northern Territory and any parts of Western Australia and North Queensland, north of 26th parallel south latitude)".

- American Samoa (1)
- Australia (33 + 1 guest)
- (Australia) Australian Masters Athletics (1)
- Cook Islands (2)
- Fiji (11)
- French Polynesia (8)
- Guam (9)
- Kiribati (7)
- Marshall Islands (2)
- Micronesia (5)
- Nauru (7)
- New Caledonia (2)
- New Zealand (27)
- Norfolk Island (1)
- (Northern Territory) / (Queensland) Northern Australia (36)
- Northern Mariana Islands (2)
- Palau (5)
- Papua New Guinea (29 + 1 guest)
- Samoa (7)
- Solomon Islands (2)
- Tonga (9)
- Vanuatu (9)
