= 2012 Oceania Athletics Championships =

- Dates: June 27–29
- Host city: Cairns, Australia
- Venue: Barlow Park
- Level: Senior
- Events: 40 (20 men, 20 women)
- Participation: 20/21 nations

The 2012 Oceania Athletics Championships were held at the Barlow Park in Cairns, Queensland, Australia, between June 27–29, 2012.

Medals are awarded in the two regional divisions "East" and "West".

A total of 40 events were contested, 20 by men and 20 by women. Moreover, a mixed 8x100 metres relay, as well as exhibition events for local athletes with disabilities, masters athletes and school age athletes were included.

Athletics Northern Territory and Athletics North Queensland sent a Combined "North Australia" Team including athletes who have not been chosen in the official Australian Team. The status of these athletes (e.g., eligibility for winning medals or guest status) could not be determined. However, one source verifies the win of a medal for an athlete representing Northern Australia.

Complete results can be found on the webpages of Oceania Athletics Association and of Queensland Athletics.

== Regional Division East ==
=== Medal summary ===
==== Men ====
Event	Gold		Silver		Bronze	
100 metres (wind: +1.6 m/s)	Isaac Tatoa (NZL)	10.65	David Alexandrine (NCL)	10.87	Matthew Wyatt (NZL)	11.19
200 metres (wind: +0.3 m/s)	Roy Ravana (FIJ)	21.66	David Alexandrine (NCL)	22.02	Epeli Ika (TGA)	23.19
400 metres	Liam Mitchell (NZL)	48.83	Ratutira Narara (FIJ)	49.34		
800 metres	Adrien Kela (NCL)	1:55.82	Emosi Bure (FIJ)	2:02.06	Penetekoso Fale (SAM)	2:13.60
1500 metres	Adrien Kela (NCL)	4:04.53	Theo Houdret (NCL)	4:15.20	Emosi Bure (FIJ)	4:27.01
5000 metres	Nordine Benfodda (NCL)	15:57.90	Gilles Brouillaud (NCL)	16:52.43	Sébastien Guesdon (NCL)	17:03.92
3000 metres steeplechase	Theo Houdret (NCL)	10:13.80	Gilles Brouillaud (NCL)	10:47.19		
High jump	Raihau Maiau (PYF)	1.85m	Daniel Griffiths (NFK)	1.74m		
Long jump	Raihau Maiau (PYF)	7.42m (wind: +2.2 m/s) w	Matthew Wyatt (NZL)	6.81m (wind: +1.5 m/s)		
Triple jump	Scott Thomson (NZL)	14.74m (wind: +0.4 m/s)				
Shot put	Emanuele Fuamatu (SAM)	18.26m	Jerram Huston (NZL)	14.89m	Damian Smuts (NZL)	14.62m
Discus throw	Alex Rose (SAM)	56.29m	Marshall Hall (NZL)	50.43m	Damian Smuts (NZL)	41.02m
Hammer throw	Alex Rose (SAM)	51.10m	Damian Smuts (NZL)	49.58m		
4 x 100 metres relay	New Zealand; Isaac Tatoa; Liam Mitchell; Blair Grant; Matthew Wyatt	41.91	Tonga; Sione Talanoa; Leveni Hu'Avi; Siueni Filimone; Epeli Ika	43.16		
4 x 400 metres relay	New Zealand; William Cowper; Matthew Wyatt; Phillip Wyatt; Liam Mitchell	3:23.28	French Polynesia; Raihau Maiau; Teiva Brinkfield; Namataiki Tevenino; Gregory Bradai	3:32.30		

==== Women ====
Event	Gold		Silver		Bronze	
100 metres (wind: +0.4 m/s)	Larissa Dyke (NZL)	12.32	Zoe Ballantyne (NZL)	12.46	Nneka Okpala (NZL)	12.58
200 metres (wind: +0.8 m/s)	Zoe Ballantyne (NZL)	24.97	Suliana Batirau Gusuivalu (FIJ)	25.35	Larissa Dyke (NZL)	25.85
400 metres	Suliana Batirau Gusuivalu (FIJ)	57.14				
1500 metres	Christina Taylor (NZL)	4:40.21				
5000 metres	Elodie Mevel (PYF)	20:27.63	Isabelle Oblet (NCL)	20:46.84		
10000 metres	Elodie Mevel (PYF)	42:43.71				
3000 metres steeplechase	Christina Taylor (NZL)	11:21.94	Isabelle Oblet (NCL)	13:11.12		
100 metres hurdles (wind: +0.0 m/s)	Zoe Ballantyne (NZL)	14.51				
400 metres hurdles	Zoe Ballantyne (NZL)	61.63				
High jump	Vianca du Toit (NZL)	1.71m				
Triple jump	Nneka Okpala (NZL)	12.85m (wind: +1.9 m/s)	Greer Alsop (NZL)	12.38m (wind: +2.6 m/s) w		
Shot put	Alexaraee Toeaina (ASA)	11.44m	Atana Takosi (NCL)	10.93m		
Discus throw	Alexaraee Toeaina (ASA)	48.99m	Claire Morgan (ASA)	44.91m	Atana Takosi (NCL)	40.78m
Hammer throw	Rebecca Hodgson (NZL)	47.78m	Alexaraee Toeaina (ASA)	41.98m		
Javelin throw	Tori Peeters (NZL)	42.21m	Claire Morgan (ASA)	34.20m		
5000 metres Walk	Roseanne Robinson (NZL)	24:34.24				
10000 metres Walk	Roseanne Robinson (NZL)	49.43				
4 x 100 metres relay	Fiji; Mereseini Naidau; Suliana Batirau Gusuivalu; Elenoa Sailosi; Miriama Senokonoko	49.72				
4 x 400 metres relay	Fiji; Suliana Batirau Gusuivalu; Mereseini Naidau; Elenoa Sailosi; Miriama Senokonoko	3:59.33	New Zealand; Zoe Ballantyne; Katelyn Matthews; Ashleigh Sando; Maggie Unternahrer	4:00.71		

=== Medal table East (unofficial) ===
Rank	Nation	Gold	Silver	Bronze	Total
1	New Zealand (NZL)	17	7	5	29
2	New Caledonia (NCL)	4	8	2	14
3	Fiji (FIJ)	4	3	1	8
4	French Polynesia (PYF)	4	1	0	5
5	Samoa (SAM)	3	0	1	4
6	American Samoa (ASA)	2	3	0	5
7	Tonga (TON)	0	1	1	2
8	Norfolk Island (NFK)	0	1	0	1
Totals (8 entries)		34	24	10	68

=== Participation East (unofficial) ===
The participation of athletes from 10 countries could be determined. Tuvalu sent only athletes for the U-20 championships. East regional division:

- American Samoa
- Cook Islands
- Fiji
- French Polynesia
- New Caledonia
- New Zealand
- Niue
- Norfolk Island
- Samoa
- Tonga

== Regional Division West ==
=== Medal summary ===
==== Men ====
Event	Gold		Silver		Bronze	
100 metres (wind: +1.2 m/s)	Joe Matmat (PNG)	11.06	Reginald Worealevi (PNG)	11.08	Kendy Kenneth (VAN)	11.28
200 metres (wind: +1.1 m/s)	James Grimm (AUS)	21.57	Paul Pokana (PNG)	22.13	Luke Grimley (AUS); Joe Matmat (PNG)	22.14
400 metres	Ethan Millward (AUS)	47.54	Jackson Mallory (AUS)	47.87	Kevin Kapmatana (PNG)	48.65
800 metres	Harris Scouller (AUS)	1:52.76	Arnold Sorina (VAN)	1:53.33	Derek Mandell (GUM)	1:56.51
1500 metres	Derek Mandell (GUM)	4:02.81	Michael Ryde (AUS)	4:12.47	(Northern Territory) / (Queensland) Billy Bragg (NAUS)	4:14.94
5000 metres	(Northern Territory) / (Queensland) Darren Peacock (NAUS)	16:13.19	Christopher Magtoto (GUM)	16:26.54	(Northern Territory) / (Queensland) Paulo Dejesus (NAUS)	17:12.91
10000 metres	Christopher Magtoto (GUM)	34:17.44	Tony Gordon (AUS)	36:37.82		
3000 metres steeplechase	Anthony Lynch (AUS)	10:43.68				
110 metres hurdles (wind: +1.9 m/s)	Greg Eyears (AUS)	14.69	Sean Kweifio-Okai (AUS)	15.77	Michael Herreros (GUM)	17.32
400 metres hurdles	Jeofry Limtiaco (GUM)	57.57	Nathan McConchie (AUS)	58.22	Michael Herreros (GUM)	65.85
High jump^{1.)}	(Northern Territory) / (Queensland) Blake Acton (NAUS)	1.96m	David Jessem (PNG)	1.93m	Joel Mason (AUS)	1.90m
Long jump	Scott Crowe (AUS)	7.44m (wind: +1.9 m/s)	Robert Stevens (AUS)	7.12m (wind: +2.0 m/s)	Anthony Di Quinzio (AUS)	6.67m (wind: +2.2 m/s) w
Triple jump	Alex Lorraway (AUS)	15.32m (wind: +0.4 m/s)	Daniel Pagnoccolo (AUS)	14.20m (wind: -0.4 m/s)	Anthony Di Quinzio (AUS)	14.09m (wind: -0.3 m/s)
Shot put	Joseph Dabana (NRU)	13.53m	Michael Day (AUS)	12.88m	Raobu Tarawa (KIR)	12.35m
Discus throw	Michael Day (AUS)	40.16m	Joseph Dabana (NRU)	38.99m	Raobu Tarawa (KIR)	38.03m
Hammer throw	Joseph Dabana (NRU)	27.21m				
Javelin throw	Calumn Hockey (AUS)	46.70m				
5000 metres Walk	Brandon Dewar (AUS)	21:39.81	Nicholas Dewar (AUS)	22:24.31		
10000 metres Walk (Exhibition)	(Northern Territory) / (Queensland) Dane Bird-Smith (NAUS)	40.21	Nicholas Dewar (AUS)	44.09	Brandon Dewar (AUS)	46.04
4 x 100 metres relay^{2.)}	Papua New Guinea; Reginald Worealevi; Kevin Kapmatana; Solomon Kaiap; Joe Matmat	42.30	Australia; Sean Kweifio-Okai; James Grimm; Luke Grimley; Greg Eyears	42.50	Vanuatu; Daniel Philimon; Kendy Kenneth; George Vingaria Molisingi; Westly Faerua	45.37
4 x 400 metres relay^{3.)}	Australia; Ethan Millward; Luke Grimley; James Grimm; Jackson Mallory	3:12.56	Papua New Guinea; Paul Pokana; John Rivan; Joe Matmat; Kevin Kapmatana	3:15.60	Vanuatu; Arnold Sorina; Tony Lulu; Westly Faerua; Kendy Kenneth	3:32.21

^{1.)}: The high jump event was won by Jason Strano from Australia in 2.00m competing as a guest.
^{2.)}: The 4 x 100 metres relay event was won by Australia "B" (Anthony Alozie, Isaac Ntiamoah, Andrew McCabe, Josh Ross) in 39.45 running as guests.
^{3.)}: The 4 x 400 metres relay event was won by Japan (Kei Takase, Yuzo Kanemaru, Yoshihiro Azuma, Hiroyuki Nakano) in 3:06.90 running as guests. Australia "B" (Jordan Gusman, Harris Scouller, Nathan McConchie, Vaughn Harber) came in 4th in 3:24.69 also running a guests.

==== Women ====
Event	Gold		Silver		Bronze	
100 metres (wind: +1.3 m/s)	Chrissa Detanamo (NRU)	12.28	Larissa Chambers (AUS)	12.29	Yvonne Bennet (NMI)	13.20
200 metres (wind: +0.8 m/s)	Larissa Chambers (AUS)	24.70	(Northern Territory) / (Queensland) Amanda Morris (NAUS)	25.98	Yvonne Bennet (NMI)	27.04
400 metres	Donna Koniel (PNG)	56.17	Tamara Tisdall (AUS)	57.14	Sarah Salmon (AUS)	57.89
800 metres	(Northern Territory) / (Queensland) Kate Johnston (NAUS)	2:12.38	Haley Nemra (MHL)	2:16.04	Donna Koniel (PNG)	2:16.41
1500 metres	(Northern Territory) / (Queensland) Kate Johnston (NAUS)	4:32.16	Olivia Lucas (AUS)	4:47.15	Amy Atkinson (GUM)	4:57.76
5000 metres	Hilda Mabe (SOL)	22:03.24				
400 metres hurdles	Donna Koniel (PNG)	61.54	Sarah Salmon (AUS)	66.37	Kristy Hirschausen (AUS)	84.09
High jump	Kristen Smith (AUS)	1.68m	Anneke Turner (AUS)	1.68m	(Northern Territory) / (Queensland) Teagan Harris (NAUS)	1.65m
Triple jump	Allison Nankivell (AUS)	13.31m (wind: +2.2 m/s) w	Rachael Smalley (AUS)	11.38m (wind: +1.8 m/s)		
Shot put	Rebecca Direen (AUS)	12.87m				
Discus throw^{1.)}	Claudia Steiner (AUS)	38.81m	Phoebe Sloane (AUS)	37.46m		
Hammer throw	Jacinta Faint (AUS)	47.76m	(Northern Territory) / (Queensland) Madeleine MacFarlane (NAUS)	41.55m	Codie Hockey (AUS)	37.64m
5000 metres Walk	Claire Tallent (AUS)	21:57.48	Kelly Ruddick (AUS)	23:09.62		
10000 metres Walk	Claire Tallent (AUS)	44.19	Tanya Holliday (AUS)	45.23	Kelly Ruddick (AUS)	48.39
4 x 100 metres relay^{2.)}	Australia; Tamara Tisdall; Allison Nankivell; Courtney Geraghty; Larissa Chambers	49.55	Papua New Guinea; Adrine Monagi; Donna Koniel; Tehilah Womola; Priscilla Samuel	50.65	Northern Mariana Islands; Reylynn Sapong; Rachel Abrams; Liamwar Rangamar; Yvonne Bennet	53.79
4 x 400 metres relay	Australia; Sarah Salmon; Zoe Bogiatzis; Nicole Gusman; Tamara Tisdall	4:00.81	Papua New Guinea; Donna Koniel; Poro Gahekave; Tehilah Womola; Tuna Tine	4:01.77		

^{1.)}: The discus throw event was won by Dani Samuels from Australia in 56.70m competing as a guest.
^{2.)}: The 4 x 100 metres relay event wa won by Japan (Anna Doi, Momoko Takahashi, Chisato Fukushima, Yumeka Sano) in 44.39 competing as guests.

=== Medal table West (unofficial) ===
* Host nation (Australia)

Rank	Nation	Gold	Silver	Bronze	Total
1	Australia (AUS)*	21	19	8	48
2	Papua New Guinea (PNG)	4	6	3	13
3	(Northern Territory) / (Queensland) North Australia	4	2	3	9
4	Guam (GUM)	3	1	4	8
5	Nauru (NRU)	3	1	0	4
6	Solomon Islands (SOL)	1	0	0	1
7	Vanuatu (VAN)	0	1	3	4
8	Marshall Islands (MHL)	0	1	0	1
9	Northern Mariana Islands (NMI)	0	0	3	3
10	Kiribati (KIR)	0	0	2	2
Totals (10 entries)		36	31	26	93

=== Participation West (unofficial) ===
The participation of athletes from 10 countries could be determined. In addition, a combined Northern Australia team including athletes from the Northern Territory and North Queensland participated. There were no athletes from Palau.

- Australia
- Guam
- Kiribati
- Marshall Islands
- Federated States of Micronesia
- Nauru
- Northern Mariana Islands
- Papua New Guinea
- Solomon Islands
- Vanuatu
- (Northern Territory) / (Queensland) North Australia
