= Oceania Cross Country Championships =

Competition in international cross country running

- Status: active
- Genre: sports event
- Frequency: biennial
- Location: various
- Inaugurated: 2008
- Most recent: 2022 Oceania Cross Country Championships
- Next event: 2024 Oceania Cross Country Championships
- Organiser: Oceania Athletics

The Oceania Cross Country Championships are a biennial international cross country running competition. Organised by the Oceania Athletics Association, it is the area championships for the region and participation is for its member federations.

The championships were inaugurated in 2008 in Saipan and the venue for the championships changes every two years. It was initially conceived as an annual event; however, after the third edition in 2010, the championships changed to a biennial event.

Unlike the World Championships for the sport, the Oceania Cross Country Championships consists of races in age categories, with separate senior, under-20, and under-18 races for both male and female athletes.

== Editions ==
Edition	Year	City	Country	Date	Venue	No. of Countries	No. of Athletes	Ref
1st	2008	Saipan	Northern Mariana Islands	25 June	Laolao Bay Golf Resort			
2nd	2009	Christchurch, Canterbury	New Zealand	1 August				
3rd	2010	Brisbane	Australia	21 August				
4th	2012	Hamilton, Waikato	New Zealand	4 August				
5th	2014	Tumon, Tamuning	Guam	16 October				
6th	2016	Auckland	New Zealand	7 August				
7th	2018	Maleny	Australia	25 August	Maleny Golf Course			
8th	2022	Mangilao	Guam	25 June	George Washington High School			

== Results ==
=== Men's Results ===
Year	Gold		Silver		Bronze	
2008 (6 km)	Aunese Curreen; Samoa	21:05	Brendan Whelan; Australia	21:09	Lavi Sam; Vanuatu	21:14
2009 (12 km)	Timothy Rowe; Australia	38:13	Andrew Davidson; New Zealand	38:13	Edwin Henshaw; New Zealand	38:25
2010 (12 km)	Martin Dent; Australia	36:49	Liam Adams; Australia	37:05	Jeffrey Hunt; Australia	37:20
2012 (12 km) ^{†}	James Nipperess; Australia	39:05	Samuel Wreford; New Zealand	39:36	Alex Parlane; New Zealand	40:29
2014 (12 km)	Nicholas Wightman; Australia	41:13	Callan Moody; New Zealand	41:34	Simbai Casper; Papua New Guinea	42:56
2016 (10 km)	Nicholas Wightman; Australia	33:00	Jonathon Jackson; New Zealand	33:05	Daniel Balchin; New Zealand	33:12
2018 (10 km)	Andrew Buchanan; Australia	32:15.00	Riley Cocks; Australia	32:29.00	Edward Goddard; Australia	32:48.00
2022 (10 km)	Ryan Matienzo; Guam	34:41.80	Arthur Toves; Guam	35:08.63	Derek Mandell; Guam	35:30.42

^{†}: Edwin Kaitany from Kenya running as guest was 1st in 38:54.

=== Women's Results ===
Year	Gold		Silver		Bronze	
2008 (3 km)	Salome Dell; Papua New Guinea	11:08	Marie Benito; Guam	12:20	Nicole Layson; Guam	12:31
2009 (8 km)	Melinda Vernon; Australia	28:52	Fiona Crombie; New Zealand	29:07	Kellie Palmer; New Zealand	30:10
2010 (8 km)	Jessica Trengove; Australia	28:00	Clare Geraghty; Australia	28:28	Tamara Carvolth; Australia	28:38
2012 (8 km)	Celia Sullohern; Australia	29:33	Mikayla Nielsen; New Zealand	29:37	Nicki McFadzien; New Zealand	29:43
2014 (8 km)	Courtney Powell; Australia	28:55	Rachel Kingsford; New Zealand	29:37	Elodie Mevel; French Polynesia	33:25
2016 (10 km)	Laura Nagel; New Zealand	38:08	Rosa Flanagan; New Zealand	38:28	Karinna Fyfe; Australia	39:02
2018 (10 km)	Madeline Hills; Australia	37:32	Caitlin Adams; Australia	38:49	Lara Hamilton; Australia	39:23
2022 (10 km)	Ongan Awa; Papua New Guinea	41:55	Denise Meyers; Northern Mariana Islands	43:45	Ayuri Sugahara; Guam	50:54

=== Under-20 Men's Results ===
Year	Gold		Silver		Bronze	
2008						
2009 (8 km)	Aaron Pulford; New Zealand	26:11	Alex Parlane; New Zealand	26:31	Michael Banks; New Zealand	26:38
2010 (8 km)	Ethan Heywood; Australia	25:18	David Ricketts; Australia	25:22	Rhys Jones; Australia	25:24
2012 (8 km)	Matt Baxter; New Zealand	26:20	Antoine Bonnet; New Zealand	26:30	Michael Sutton; New Zealand	26:45
2014 (8 km)	Avikash Lal; Fiji	29:22	Ravnil Kumar; Fiji	31:11	Magdano Marquez; Federated States of Micronesia	33:55
2016 (8 km)	Cameron Avery; New Zealand	26:51	Matt Prest; New Zealand	27:09	Harry Ewing; New Zealand	27:13
2018 (8 km)	Haftu Strintzos; Australia	26:42	Chekole Getenet; Australia	27:04	Jackson Sharp; Australia	27:20
2022 (6 km)	Hugh Kent; Guam	20:20.00	Rynier DiRamos; Guam	21:07.10	Alexander Clark; Guam	21:07.30

=== Under-20 Women's Results ===
Year	Gold		Silver		Bronze	
2008						
2009 (6 km)	Hannah Newbould; New Zealand	21:35	Danielle Trevis; New Zealand	21:44	Olivia Burne; New Zealand	22:25
2010 (6 km)	Danielle Trevis; New Zealand	21:00	Grace Musgrove; Australia	21:42	Celia Sullohern; Australia	21:59
2012 (6 km)	Kara MacDermid; New Zealand	22:42	Georgie Grgec; New Zealand	23:28	Grace McConnochie; New Zealand	23:36
2014 (6 km)	Jenny Albert; Papua New Guinea	25:16	Aria Perez-Theisen; Guam	29:35	Mika Rosario; Guam	30:17
2016 (6 km)	Hannah Miller; New Zealand	23:49	Grace Wood; New Zealand	23:57	Jess Kikstra; New Zealand	24:09
2018 (6 km)	Ella Heeney; Australia	23:07	Brielle Erbacher; Australia	23:15	Rose Davies; Australia	23:26
2022 (6 km)	Jordan Baden; Guam	24:05	Patricia Miclat; Guam	28:06	Bekah Tavarez; Guam	28:13

=== Under-18 Boy's Results ===
Year	Gold		Silver		Bronze	
2008 (3 km)	Gregory Fosailafu; Solomon Islands	10:16	Christopher Magtoto; Guam	10:30	Jeofry Limitaco; Guam	10:54
2009						
2010						
2012						
2014						
2016 (6 km)	Isaiah Priddey; New Zealand	20:25	Kalani Sheridan; New Zealand	20:31	Trent Dodds; New Zealand	20:38
2018 (6 km)	Murdoch McIntyre; New Zealand	20:14	Matthew Rankin; Australia	20:27	Jude Thomas; Australia	20:30
2022						

=== Under-18 Girl's Results ===
Year	Gold		Silver		Bronze	
2008 (3 km)	Laura Nagel; New Zealand	10:49	Danielle Trevis; New Zealand	11:30	Jackie Gatland; Norfolk Island	12:06
2009						
2010						
2012						
2014						
2016 (4 km)	Hannah O'Connor; New Zealand	14:48	Tessa Webb; New Zealand	15:26	Liliana Braun; New Zealand	15:38
2018 (4 km)	Nikita Moore; Australia	14:40	Keely Small; Australia	14:55	Kirstie Rae; New Zealand	14:59
2022						
