= Waisale Dausoko =

Fijian long jumper

Personal information
- Born: 29 October 1996 (age 29)

Sport
- Country: Fiji
- Sport: Track and field
- Event: Long jump

Achievements and titles
- Personal best: Long jump: 7.20 m

Waisale Mateo Dausoko (born 29 October 1996) is an athlete representing Fiji. He participated in the qualification round in long jump at the World Championship in Athletics 2015 in Beijing.

His personal best in the event is 7.20 metres (23 ft 7 in) set in Suva in 2015.

== Competition record ==
Year	Competition	Venue	Position	Event	Notes
Representing Fiji
2014	Oceania Junior Championships	Avarua, Cook Islands	2nd	Long jump	6.94 m
2015	Oceania Championships	Cairns, Australia	1st	4x100 m relay	40.98 s
2015	Oceania Championships	Cairns, Australia	1st	Long jump	7.51 m (w)
2015	World Championships	Beijing, China	28th (q)	Long jump	6.89 m
