= Sharon Firisua =

Solomon Islands track and field athlete

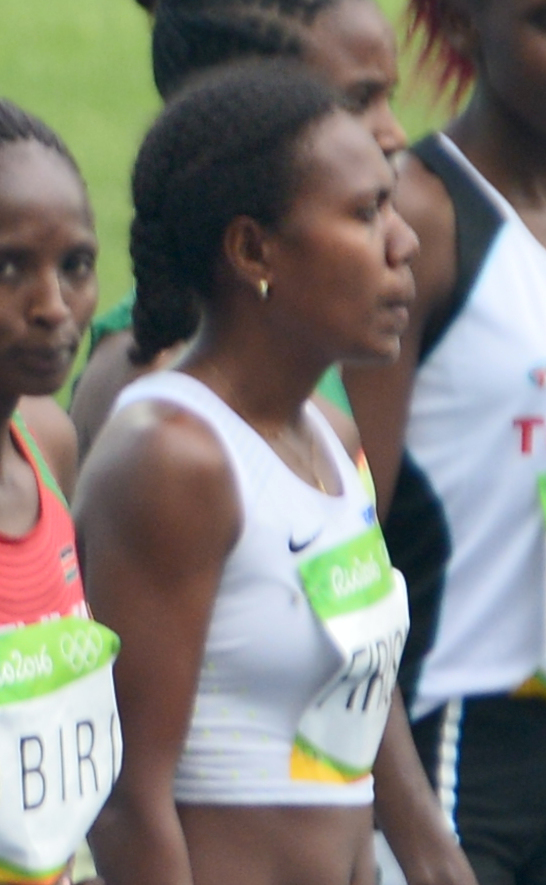
- Firisua at the 2016 Olympics

Personal information
- Nationality: Solomon Islands
- Born: 15 December 1993 (age 32) Malu'u, Solomon Islands
- Height: 1.52 m (5 ft 0 in)
- Weight: 50 kg (110 lb)

Sport
- Sport: Athletics
- Events: 1500 m, 5000 m, steeplechase
- Club: Glenhuntly Athletic Club
- Coached by: Trevor Vincent

Achievements and titles
- Personal bests: 1500 m – 4:58.45 (2013); 3000 mS – 11:50.31 (2015); 5000 m – 18:01.62(2016)
Medal record
Representing Solomon Islands
Pacific Games
Gold medal – first place	2015 Port Moresby	5000 m
Gold medal – first place	2015 Port Moresby	10,000 m
Gold medal – first place	2015 Port Moresby	Half marathon
Gold medal – first place	2019 Apia	10,000 m
Oceania Championships
Gold medal – first place	2013 Papeete	5000 m
Gold medal – first place	2014 Avarua	5000 m
Gold medal – first place	2014 Avarua	10,000 m
Gold medal – first place	2015 Cairns	5000 m
Silver medal – second place	2013 Papeete	3000 m steeplechase
Bronze medal – third place	2015 Cairns	3000 m steeplechase
- Updated on 23 August 2016

Sharon Kikini Firisua (born 15 December 1993) is a Solomon Islands track and field athlete. At the 2016 Summer Olympics she competed in the 5000 m event. At the 2020 Summer Olympics, she competed in the Women's marathon.

== Career ==
Firisua is from Loina on the island of Malaita. In 2013 she was named the Solomon Islands Sportswoman of the Year. She started training seriously in 2010 and at her second Pacific Games in 2015 she took two gold medals at 5000 and 10,000m and another in the half marathon in Port Moresby, Papua New Guinea.

Firisua represented the Solomon Islands in the women's 100 metres event at the 2024 Summer Olympics. She ran a personal best time of 14.31 seconds during the preliminary round and finished last in her heat. At the 2024 Summer Olympics closing ceremony, Firisua carried the flag of the Solomon Islands.
