= Sisilia Seavula =

Fijian sprinter

Personal information
- Born: Sisilia Seavula; November 15, 1995 (age 30)

Sport
- Country: Fiji
- Sport: Athletics
- Event: Sprint

Achievements and titles
- Personal best: 11.98secs (100m)
Medal record
Women's Athletics
Representing Fiji
Pacific Games
Gold medal – first place	2015 Port Moresby	4x100 m relay
Silver medal – second place	2011 Nouméa	100 m
Bronze medal – third place	2011 Nouméa	4x100 m relay
Bronze medal – third place	2015 Port Moresby	100 m
Bronze medal – third place	2015 Port Moresby	200 m
Oceania Championships
Gold medal – first place	2015 Cairns	800 m medley relay
Silver medal – second place	2013 Pepeete	800 m medley relay
- Updated on 23 August 2016

Sisilia Seavula (born November 15, 1995) is a Fijian sprinter. She competed at the 2016 Summer Olympics in the Women's 100 metres event. She progressed from the first preliminary round with a time of 12.34 seconds. In the quarterfinal round, Seavula finished with a time of 12.48 seconds. She did not advance to the semifinals. She attended St Joseph's Secondary School, Fiji where she won the blue ribbon event in the 100m.

== Personal Bests ==
Event	Result	Wind	Venue	Date
55 metres	7.50		Lamoni (USA)	15.01.2016
60 metres	8.05	8.55	Pella (USA)	05.12.2015
100 metres	12.27	+1.0	Suva (FIJ)	07.07.2016
200 metres	25.41	-3.6	Port Moresby (PNG)	17.07.2015
200m ind.	26.20		Lincoln (USA)	06.02.2016
4 × 100 m	46.17		Port Moresby (PNG)	17.07.2015
4 × 400 m	4:00.90		Brisbane (AUS)	14.01.2012
