= Raihau Maiau =

French Polynesian-born athlete

Personal information
- Born: 8 January 1992 (age 34) Moorea-Maiao, French Polynesia
- Education: Paul Sabatier University
- Height: 184 cm (6 ft 0 in)
- Weight: 74 kg (163 lb)

Sport
- Country: France / French Polynesia
- Sport: Athletics
- Event: Long jump
- Coached by: Dominique Hernandez

Raihau Maiau (born 8 January 1992 in Moorea-Maiao) is a French Polynesian athlete competing in the long jump. He won the gold medal at the 2017 Jeux de la Francophonie and the bronze at the 2017 Summer Universiade.

== International competitions ==
Year	Competition	Venue	Position	Event	Notes
Representing French Polynesia
2009	Polynesian Championships	Gold Coast, Australia	2nd	High jump	1.87 m
2009	Polynesian Championships	Gold Coast, Australia	1st	Long jump	6.73 m
2009	Polynesian Championships	Gold Coast, Australia	1st	Triple jump	13.76 m
2009	Pacific Mini Games	Rarotonga, Cook Islands	2nd	High jump	1.92 m
2009	Pacific Mini Games	Rarotonga, Cook Islands	2nd	Long jump	7.45 m
2009	Pacific Mini Games	Rarotonga, Cook Islands	3rd	Triple jump	13.69 m
2010	Oceania Championships	Cairns, Australia	2nd	Long jump	7.64 m (w)
2010	Oceania Junior Championships	Cairns, Australia	4th	Long jump	6.31 m (w)
2010	Oceania Junior Championships	Cairns, Australia	1st	Triple jump	14.07 m
2011	Oceania Championships	Apia, Samoa	1st	High jump	2.02 m
2011	Oceania Championships	Apia, Samoa	1st	Long jump	7.58 m
2011	Oceania Championships	Apia, Samoa	2nd	Triple jump	14.29 m
2011	Pacific Games	Nouméa, New Caledonia	2nd	Long jump	7.54 m
2012	World Indoor Championships	Istanbul, Turkey	38th (h)	Long jump	7.18 s
2012	Oceania Championships	Cairns, Australia	–	100 m	DNF
2012	Oceania Championships	Cairns, Australia	2nd	4 × 400 m relay	3:32.30
2012	Oceania Championships	Cairns, Australia	1st	High jump	1.85 m
2012	Oceania Championships	Cairns, Australia	1st	Long jump	7.42 m (w)
2015	Pacific Games	Port Moresby, Papua New Guinea	1st	Long jump	8.14 m (w)
Representing France
2017	Jeux de la Francophonie	Abidjan, Ivory Coast	1st	Long jump	7.90 m (w)
2017	Universiade	Taipei, Taiwan	3rd	Long jump	7.91 m
Representing French Polynesia
2025	World Indoor Championships	Nanjing, China	40th (h)	60 m	6.85 s
2025	World Championships	Tokyo, Japan	26th (q)	Long jump	7.75 m

== Personal bests ==
Outdoor

- 100 metres – 10.58 (+0.7 m/s, Toulouse 2014)
- Long jump – 7.98 (+1.7 m/s, Marseille 2015)

Indoor

- 60 metres – 6.72 (Nantes 2016)
- Long jump – 8.02 (Nantes 2016)
