= Adrien Kela =

New Caledonian middle distance athlete

Personal information
- Nationality: New Caledonian (French)
- Born: 23 July 1991 (age 35)

Sport
- Sport: Track and field
- Event: 800m

Achievements and titles
- Personal bests: 200 m: 22.85 (+0.6 wind) (2011); 400 m: 49.84 (2013); 800 m: 1:49.80 (2011); 1000 m: 2:26.08 (2010); 1500 m: 3:57.20 (2011)
Medal record
Men's Athletics
Representing New Caledonia
Pacific Games
Gold medal – first place	2011 Nouméa	800 m
Gold medal – first place	2011 Nouméa	1500 m
Oceania Athletics Championships
Gold medal – first place	2012 Cairns	800 m
Gold medal – first place	2012 Cairns	1500 m
Gold medal – first place	2013 Papeete	800 m
Silver medal – second place	2013 Papeete	1500 m
Pacific Mini Games
Gold medal – first place	2013 Mata-Utu	800 m
Gold medal – first place	2013 Mata-Utu	1500 m

Adrien Kela (born 23 July 1991) is a New Caledonian middle distance athlete whose main event is the 800 metres. Kela currently holds two of New Caledonia's national records (800m and 1000m). In 2011 Adrien competed in the 2011 Pacific Games receiving two first places in the 800 metres and the 1500 metres events.

== International competitions ==
Year	Competition	Venue	Position	Notes
Representing New Caledonia
2011	Pacific Games	Nouméa, New Caledonia	1st	800 m
2011	Pacific Games	Nouméa, New Caledonia	1st	1500 m
2012	Oceania Athletics Championships	Cairns, Australia	1st	800 m
2012	Oceania Athletics Championships	Cairns, Australia	1st	1500 m
2013	Oceania Athletics Championships	Papeete, French Polynesia	1st	800 m
2013	Oceania Athletics Championships	Papeete, French Polynesia	2nd	1500 m
2013	Pacific Mini Games	Mata-Utu, Wallis & Futuna	1st	800 m
2013	Pacific Mini Games	Mata-Utu, Wallis & Futuna	1st	1500 m
2015	Pacific Games	Port Moresby, Papua New Guinea	2nd	800 m
2015	Pacific Games	Port Moresby, Papua New Guinea	1st	1500 m

== Personal bests ==
Event	Wind	Time	Date	Location
200m	+0.6	22.85	4 March 2011	Nouméa
400m		49.84	21 June 2013	Nouméa
800m		1:49.80	15 April 2011	Melbourne
1000m		2:26.08	16 October 2010	Nouméa
1500m		3:57.20	15 October 2011	Nouméa
