= Maudie Skyring =

Australian athlete (born 1997)

Personal information
- Nationality: Australian
- Born: 9 April 1997 (age 29)

Sport
- Country: Australia
- Sport: Athletics
- Event(s): Middle-distance running, Cross country running
Medal record
Women's athletics
Representing AUS
Oceania Championships
Silver medal – second place	2015 Cairns	4x400m relay
Bronze medal – third place	2015 Cairns	1500 m
Bronze medal – third place	2024 Suva	5000 m

Maudie Skyring (born 9 April 1997) is an Australian middle-distance and cross country runner. She represented Australia at the 2026 World Athletics Cross Country Championships.

== Biography ==
From Mangerton, a suburb of Wollongong in New South Wales, Skyring was initially a field hockey player. Skyring started in athletics relatively late as a 15 year-old. She ran her first races in New South Wales in 2013 for Club Kembla Joggers. That year, she appeared at her first national cross country championships in Launceston running for the New South Wales team, placing 21st in the U18 race. The following year, she placed 14th at the cross country nationals.

When she was 18 years-old she made her Australia debut, placing third over 1500 metres at the 2015 Oceania Athletics Championships in Cairns, also winning a silver medal in the women’s 4 x 400 metres relay. She later joined Florida State University in the United States, competing in the NCAA.

In 2023, Skyring joined the On Athletics Club in Oceania, running under running coach Craig Mottram. Skyring won the bronze medal at the 2024 Oceania Athletics Championships in Suva, Fiji, in June 2024. Skyring competed in the 2025 Diamond League in Xiamen, running 14:55.93 in the 5000 metres in April 2025.

Skyring represented Australia at the 2026 World Athletics Cross Country Championships in Tallahassee, Florida. Competing at the 2026 Maurie Plant Meet in Melbourne in March, she placed second over 3000 metres in 8:47.05, behind compatriot Rose Davies and ahead of Georgia Griffith. The following month, she placed third overall in the 5000 m at the Australian Championships and went on to compete over 5000 m at the 2026 Shanghai Diamond League.
