= Kasandra Vegas =

Samoan athlete

Personal information
- Born: 1 March 1991 (age 35)

Sport
- Country: Samoa
- Sport: Discus throw / Hammer throw
Medal record
Women's discus / hammer throw
Representing Samoa
Pacific Games
Bronze medal – third place	2015 Port Moresby	Discus
Bronze medal – third place	2015 Port Moresby	Hammer throw
Oceania Championships
Bronze medal – third place	2015 Cairns	Hammer throw
Bronze medal – third place	2014 Rarotonga	Discus
Bronze medal – third place	2014 Rarotonga	Hammer throw

Kasandra Salamasina Le Tafa’ifa Vegas (born 1 March 1991) is a Samoan American athlete who has represented Samoa at the Pacific Games.

Vegas is from Honolulu, Hawaii, and was educated at Kamehameha High School and Northern Arizona University, where she majored in sports medicine and exercise science. In 2013 she was named a finalist for the National Collegiate Athletic Association women of the year award. She later studied for a master's degree in international public health at the University of Sydney in Australia.

She represented Samoa at the 2014 Oceania Athletics Championships in Rarotonga, winning bronze in both the discus and hammer throw. She won another bronze at the 2015 championships in Cairns. At the 2015 Pacific Games in Port Moresby, Papua New Guinea she won bronze in both the discus and hammer throw. She had hoped to be selected for the Samoan team for the 2016 Summer Olympics in Rio de Janeiro, Brazil, but failed to qualify.
