= Rosefelo Siosi =

Solomon Islands track and field athlete (born 1996)

Personal information
- Nationality: Solomon Islands
- Born: 23 August 1996 (age 29)

Sport
- Sport: Athletics
- Event: Long Distance
Medal record
Men's Athletics
Representing Solomon Islands
Pacific Games
Gold medal – first place	2015 Port Moresby	10000 m
Silver medal – second place	2015 Port Moresby	5000 m
Oceania Championships
Bronze medal – third place	2015 Cairns	10000 m
- Updated on 23 August 2016

Rosefelo Siosi (born 23 August 1996) is a Solomon Islands track and field athlete.

At the 2016 Summer Olympics he competed in the men's 5000 m. He finished in 48th place in a personal best time after he crossed the finish line in 15:47.76.

Siosi received a huge crowd ovation at the 2022 Commonwealth Games in Birmingham on 6 August 2022 when he completed the 5,000m race alone, 4 minutes after event winner Jacob Kiplimo who was completing his lap of honour as Siosi continued to run his race. Comparisons were drawn with Eric Moussambani, nicknamed ‘Eric the Eel’ and ski jumper Eddie the Eagle who similarly captured the hearts of spectators with endeavour rather than achievement at major competitions. Siosi’s time in Birmingham of 17:28.93 was a season's best for him. Following the race, he said he hoped his nation would soon get a synthetic running track to help his training. After finishing his studies, he aimed to run well at the 2023 Pacific Games before aiming for the Paris Olympics in 2024.
