= 2013 Oceania Athletics Championships =

Athletic competition

XIII Oceania Athletics Championships
- Dates: June 3-5
- Host city: Papeete, French Polynesia
- Venue: Stade Pater Te Hono Nui
- Level: Senior
- Events: 44 (21 men, 22 women. 1 mixed)

The 2013 Oceania Athletics Championships were held at the Stade Pater Te Hono Nui in Papeete, French Polynesia, between June 3–5, 2013. The event was held jointly with the 2013 Oceania Youth Athletics Championships, and there were also exhibition events for masters, athletes with a disability and children. Detailed reports on a day by day basis were given.

The event was overshadowed by the death of New Zealand racewalker Lesley Cantwell. She collapsed while waiting for the medal ceremony after winning the gold medal in the 5000 metres race walk event, and was taken to Papeete Hospital on life support. However, she died a few days later.

In the open division, a total of 44 events were contested, 21 by men and 22 by women, as well as 1 mixed medley relay.

== Medal summary ==
Complete results can be found on the Oceania Athletics Association webpage.

=== Men ===
Event	Gold		Silver		Bronze	
100 metres (wind: -1.0 m/s)	Banuve Tabakaucoro; Fiji	10.65	Siueni Filimone; Tonga	11.17	William Smart; New Zealand	11.17
200 metres (wind: -1.5 m/s)	Banuve Tabakaucoro; Fiji	21.08	Nelson Stone; Papua New Guinea	21.98	William Smart; New Zealand	22.32
400 metres	Robert Jopp; New Zealand	48.44	Tom Symes; New Zealand	49.59	Theo Piniau; Papua New Guinea	49.70
800 metres	Adrien Kela; New Caledonia	1:52.81	Alex Beddoes; Cook Islands	1:54.10	Jack Bruce; Australia	1:55.91
1500 metres	Jack Bruce; Australia	4:01.18	Adrien Kela; New Caledonia	4:05.19	(Northern Territory) / (Queensland) Thomas Briggs (NAUS)	4:05.39
5000 metres	Josh Maisey; New Zealand	15:33.90	(Northern Territory) / (Queensland) Anthony Craig (NAUS)	15:38.74	Sapolai Yao; Papua New Guinea	15:43.03
10000 metres	Josh Maisey; New Zealand	32:31.31	(Northern Territory) / (Queensland) Anthony Craig (NAUS)	33:35.39	Sapolai Yao; Papua New Guinea	33:44.20
3000 metres steeplechase	Sapolai Yao; Papua New Guinea	9:49.67	(Northern Territory) / (Queensland) Hamish MacDonald (NAUS)	9:56.49	Winsy Tama; French Polynesia	9:59.03
110 metres hurdles (wind: +0.1 m/s)	Tyler Heron; Australia	15.57	Michael Herreros; Guam	16.64	Nicholas Raval; Guam	16.87
400 metres hurdles	Mowen Boino; Papua New Guinea	51.97	Leigh Bennett; Australia	52.08	David Benjimen; Vanuatu	54.14
High jump	Jordan Peters; New Zealand	2.06m	Cedric Dubler; Australia	2.06m	Isikeli Waqa; Fiji	2.03m
Pole vault	Cedric Dubler; Australia	4.50m	Brandon Ricou; French Polynesia	3.80m		
Long jump	Cedric Dubler; Australia	7.24m w (wind: +3.4 m/s)	Simione Isimeli; Fiji	6.95m w (wind: +3.6 m/s)	William Cowper; New Zealand	6.71m w (wind: +2.4 m/s)
Triple jump	Scott Thomson; New Zealand	14.91m (wind: +0.0 m/s)	Todd Swanson; New Zealand	14.57m (wind: +0.0 m/s)	Mong Tavol; Papua New Guinea	14.18m (wind: +0.0 m/s)
Shot put	Alexander Rose; Samoa	17.22m	Loïc Tuaira; French Polynesia	14.86m	Steven Lasei; Samoa	14.76m
Discus throw	Alexander Rose; Samoa	56.05m	Steven Lasei; Samoa	45.66m	Loïc Tuaira; French Polynesia	42.05m
Hammer throw	Alexander Rose; Samoa	55.49m	Steven Lasei; Samoa	31.05m		
Javelin throw	Leslie Copeland; Fiji	76.87m	John Crandell; Australia	59.46m	/Jacky Tuakoifenua; Wallis and Futuna	57.97m
Decathlon	Nick Gerrard; New Zealand	6807	Andrew Hodges; Australia	6573	Aaron Page; Australia	5861
4 x 100 metres relay	Tonga; Lars Fa'apoi; Heamatangi Tu'ivai; Siosaia Teumohenga; Siueni Filimone	43.27	Kiribati; El-Jay Neneia; Kiatau Cama; Tealava Lotolua; Nooa Takooa	44.46	Tahiti; Laurent Coia; Rainui Taraufau; Rony Chang Yuk Shan; Ahonui Beauval-Tahi	44.48
4 x 400 metres relay	New Zealand; William Smart; William Cowper; Robert Jopp; Tom Symes	3:21.26	Australia; Andrew Broadbent; Leigh Bennett; Aaron Page; Tyler Heron	3:28.15	Vanuatu; George Vingaria Molisingi; David Benjamin; Tom Joe; George Wes Faerua	3:31.18

=== Women ===
Event	Gold		Silver		Bronze	
100 metres (wind: -0.7 m/s)	Toea Wisil; Papua New Guinea	11.90	Patricia Taea; Cook Islands	12.57	Simone Small; New Zealand	12.63
200 metres (wind: -1.1 m/s)	Toea Wisil; Papua New Guinea	24.45	Louise Jones; New Zealand	24.75	Madeleine Powell; Australia	25.56
400 metres	Alicia Keir; Australia	55.07	Louise Jones; New Zealand	55.51	Naomi Blaz; Guam	61.99
800 metres	Alicia Keir; Australia	2:08.05	Kerry White; New Zealand	2:08.14	Pippa Trevella; New Zealand	2:10.29
1500 metres	Pippa Trevella; New Zealand	4:33.36	Kerry White; New Zealand	4:38.24	Mereseini Naidau; Fiji	4:57.75
5000 metres	Sharon Firisua; Solomon Islands	19:41.23	Sophie Bouchonnet; French Polynesia	19:49.95	Nathalie Marguerit; French Polynesia	19:50.26
10000 metres	Elodie Mevel; French Polynesia	41:04.47	Sophie Gardon; French Polynesia	41:13.85	Hina Louison-Grepin; French Polynesia	41:38.74
3000 metres steeplechase	Stephanie Kondogonis; Australia	11:18.08	Sharon Firisua; Solomon Islands	12:20.57		
100 metres hurdles (wind: -0.7 m/s)	Natalie Booth; New Zealand	16.16				
400 metres hurdles	Madeleine Powell; Australia	63.17	Takina Bernadino; French Polynesia	65.63	Naomi Blaz; Guam	66.65
High jump	Timeri Lamorelle; French Polynesia	1.52m				
Pole vault	Lucie Tepea; French Polynesia	2.70m				
Long jump	Emma Knight; Australia	5.74m (wind: +0.0 m/s)	(Northern Territory) / (Queensland) Catherine Hannell (NAUS)	5.44m (wind: -1.4 m/s)	Timeri Lamorelle; French Polynesia	5.14m (wind: -0.4 m/s)
Triple jump	Jenni Scott; New Zealand	11.64m (wind: NWI)	Anna Thomson; New Zealand	11.60m (wind: NWI)	Timeri Lamorelle; French Polynesia	11.05m (wind: NWI)
Shot put	Tereapii Tapoki; Cook Islands	14.17m	Rebecca Direen; Australia	12.74m	Alexaraee Toeaina; American Samoa	11.33m
Discus throw	Christie Chamberlain; Australia	50.68m	Tereapii Tapoki; Cook Islands	49.98m	Alexaraee Toeaina; American Samoa	43.72m
Hammer throw	Rebecca Direen; Australia	48.17m	Danielle Botha; New Zealand	46.82m	Montaya Wharehinga; New Zealand	45.06m
Javelin throw	Laura Overton; New Zealand	41.98m	/Emilie Falelavaki; Wallis and Futuna	41.93m	Ruby Cochrane; New Zealand	34.42m
Heptathlon	Elana Withnall; Australia	4348	Mafi Mapa; Tonga	3000	Ana Katiloka; Tonga	2625
5000 metres Walk	Lesley Cantwell; New Zealand	25:39.79				
4 x 100 metres relay	New Zealand; Simone Small; Ellie McCleery; Rosy Hogben; Kerry White	49.07	(Northern Territory) / (Queensland) North Australia; Catherine Hannell; Amanda Morris; Chloe Botella; Rita Fontaine	51.58	Guam; Aria Perez-Theisen; Naomi Blaz; Regine Tugade; Raquel Walker	52.35
4 x 400 metres relay	New Zealand; Louise Jones; Ellie McCleery; Pippa Trevella; Kerry White	3:52.38	Australia; Tayla-Paige Billington; Emma Knight; Elana Withnall; Alicia Keir	4:01.93		

=== Mixed ===
Event	Gold		Silver		Bronze	
800 Sprint Medley relay	New Zealand; Simone Small; Austen Heuvel; Louise Jones; Bailey Stewart	1:36.31	Fiji; Sisilia Seavula; Banuve Tabakaucoro; Mereseini Naidau; Simione Isimeli	1:38.95	French Polynesia; HerEani Manate; Namataiki Tevenino; Timeri Lamorelle; Gregory Bradai	1:42.87

== Medal table (unofficial) ==
* Host nation (French Polynesia)

Rank	Nation	Gold	Silver	Bronze	Total
1	New Zealand	15	8	7	30
2	Australia	12	7	3	22
3	Papua New Guinea	4	1	4	9
4	Fiji	3	2	2	7
5	Samoa	3	2	1	6
6	French Polynesia*	2	5	5	12
7	Cook Islands	1	3	0	4
8	Tonga	1	2	1	4
9	New Caledonia	1	1	0	2
9	Solomon Islands	1	1	0	2
11	French Polynesia	1	0	3	4
12	(Northern Territory) / (Queensland) North Australia	0	5	1	6
13	Guam	0	1	4	5
14	/Wallis and Futuna	0	1	1	2
15	Kiribati	0	1	0	1
16	American Samoa	0	0	2	2
16	Vanuatu	0	0	2	2
Totals (17 entries)		44	40	36	120

== Participation (unofficial) ==
The participation of 480 athletes representing 24 teams from 22 countries was published. The list comprises also the U-18 athletes, some of them competed in both the open and the youth event, especially in the relays.

20 of the participating teams were OAA members, one team an associate OAA member, only Niue was absent.

In addition, there was a team from Wallis and Futuna, which is no OAA member, and two regional teams: A local team dubbed "Tahiti West Coast" (TWC in the results list, here dubbed TAH) and a "Regional Australia Team" (RAT in the results list, here dubbed NAUS) including athletes with "their normal place of residence in Northern Australia (defined as comprising the Northern Territory and any parts of Western Australia and Queensland, north of 26th parallel south latitude)."

- American Samoa (5)
- Australia (42)
- Cook Islands (5)
- Fiji (6)
- French Polynesia (29)
- Guam (9)
- Kiribati (4)
- Marshall Islands (2)
- Federated States of Micronesia (5)
- Nauru (5)
- New Caledonia (7)
- New Zealand (51)
- Norfolk Island (1)
- (Northern Territory) / (Queensland) North Australia (16)
- Northern Mariana Islands (5)
- Palau (4)
- Papua New Guinea (8)
- Samoa (4)
- Solomon Islands (4)
- (French Polynesia) Tahiti West Coast (42)
- Tonga (6)
- Tuvalu (3)
- Vanuatu (6)
- /Wallis and Futuna (6)
