= Loïc Mevel =

French Polynesian athlete (born 1997)

Sport
- Country: French Polynesia
- Sport: Athletics
Medal record
Men's Athletics
Representing Tahiti
Polynesian Athletics Championships
Gold medal – first place	2016 Papeete	5,000m
Gold medal – first place	2016 Papeete	10,000m
Pacific Games
Bronze medal – third place	2015 Port Moresby	5,000m
Oceania Athletics Championships
Silver medal – second place	2015 Cairns	10,000m

Loïc Mevel (born 31 August 1997) is a French Polynesian long-distance runner who has represented French Polynesia at the Pacific Games. He is the son of long-distance runner Elodie Menou.

At the 2015 Oceania Athletics Championships in Cairns he won silver in the 10,000 meters. At the 2015 Pacific Games in Port Moresby he won bronze in the 5,000 meters. At the 2016 Polynesian Championships in Athletics in Papeete he won gold in both the 5,000 meters and 10,000 meters.
