= Alex Rose (discus thrower) =

Samoan and American athletics competitor

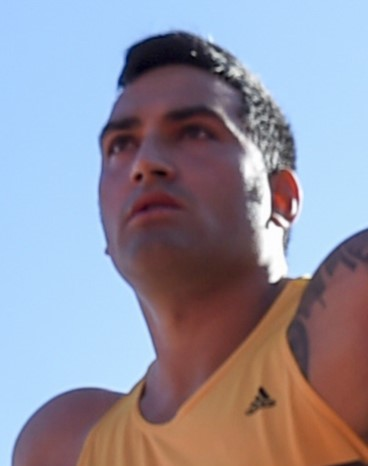

Personal information
- Born: 17 November 1991 (age 34) West Branch, Michigan, U.S.
- Education: Central Michigan University
- Height: 6 ft 2 in (188 cm)
- Weight: 280 lb (127 kg)

Sport
- Country: Samoa
- Sport: Track and field
- Events: Discus throw, shot put, hammer throw
- College team: Central Michigan Chippewas
Medal record
Men's Athletics
Representing Samoa
World Championships
Bronze medal – third place	2025 Tokyo	Discus throw
Pacific Games
Gold medal – first place	2015 Port Moresby	Discus
Silver medal – second place	2015 Port Moresby	Shot Put
Silver medal – second place	2015 Port Moresby	Hammer
Oceania Championships
Gold medal – first place	2012 Cairns	Discus
Gold medal – first place	2012 Cairns	Hammer
Gold medal – first place	2013 Papeete	Shot Put
Gold medal – first place	2013 Papeete	Discus
Gold medal – first place	2013 Papeete	Hammer
Gold medal – first place	2015 Cairns	Shot Put
Gold medal – first place	2015 Cairns	Discus
Silver medal – second place	2015 Cairns	Hammer
Gold medal – first place	2017 Suva	Discus
- Updated on 21 September 2025

Alexander Melei Rose (born 17 November 1991) is a Samoan and American athlete, competing in the discus throw. He won a bronze medal at the 2025 World Championships, becoming the first Samoan to win a medal at the World Athletics Championships. He represented Samoa at the 2016, 2020, and 2024 Summer Olympics.

== Life ==
Although born in the United States, Rose holds dual citizenship with Samoa, since his father was born there and emigrated to the US as a 19-year-old. He threw for Central Michigan University.

He represented Samoa in the 2013 World Championships in Athletics and the 2015 World Championships in Athletics, failing to qualify for the final on both occasions. He's had great success at the Oceania Athletics Championships, with eight gold medals and a silver in three different throwing events—Discus, Shot Put & Hammer Throw—over four different games from 2021 to 2017.

At the 2022 World Athletics Championships he made the final, coming 8th in the world. Rose competed for Samoa at the 2022 Commonwealth Games in Birmingham where he finished 4th with a best throw of 64.56 m, just 2 cm off third place.

His personal best in the discus was 66.91 metres (Claremont, California, 19 July 2019), until he improved his national record to 67.4 8m at the University of Arizona on 22 May 2021, and then, in 2023, Rose threw 70.39 m at the Oklahoma Throws Series on 16 April 2023, setting a new Oceania Area Record.

At the 2024 Olympics he became the first Pacific islander to make it to an Olympic track and field final.

Rose won the bronze medal with a throw of 66.96m at the 2025 World Athletics Championships in Tokyo. It was Samoa's first ever medal at a World Championship event.

== Competition record ==
Year	Competition	Venue	Position	Event	Notes
Representing the United States
2010	World Junior Championships	Moncton, Canada	22nd (q)	Discus throw (1.75 kg)	53.46 m
Representing Samoa
2012	Oceania Championships	Cairns, Australia	1st	Discus throw	56.29 m
2012	Oceania Championships	Cairns, Australia	1st	Hammer throw	51.10 m
2013	Oceania Championships	Papeete, French Polynesia	1st	Shot put	17.22 m
2013	Oceania Championships	Papeete, French Polynesia	1st	Discus throw	56.05 m
2013	Oceania Championships	Papeete, French Polynesia	1st	Hammer throw	55.49 m
2013	Universiade	Kazan, Russia	7th	Discus throw	58.64 m
2013	World Championships	Moscow, Russia	29th (q)	Discus throw	56.19 m
2015	Oceania Championships	Cairns, Australia	1st	Shot put	16.89 m
2015	Oceania Championships	Cairns, Australia	1st	Discus throw	60.95 m
2015	Oceania Championships	Cairns, Australia	2nd	Hammer throw	53.29 m
2015	Pacific Games	Port Moresby, Papua New Guinea	2nd	Shot put	16.58 m
2015	Pacific Games	Port Moresby, Papua New Guinea	1st	Discus throw	56.40 m
2015	Pacific Games	Port Moresby, Papua New Guinea	2nd	Hammer throw	58.66 m
2015	World Championships	Beijing, China	25th (q)	Discus throw	59.07 m
2016	Olympic Games	Rio de Janeiro, Brazil	29th (q)	Discus throw	57.24 m
2017	Oceania Championships	Suva, Fiji	1st	Discus throw	61.12m CR
2017	World Championships	London, United Kingdom	19th (q)	Discus throw	61.62 m
2018	Commonwealth Games	Gold Coast, Australia	8th	Discus throw	59.56 m
2019	World Championships	Doha, Qatar	21st (q)	Discus throw	61.80 m
2021	Olympic Games	Tokyo, Japan	18th (q)	Discus throw	61.72 m
2022	World Championships	Eugene, United States	8th	Discus throw	65.57 m
2022	Commonwealth Games	Birmingham, England	4th	Discus throw	64.56 m
2023	World Championships	Budapest, Hungary	12th	Discus throw	61.69 m
2024	Olympic Games	Paris, France	12th	Discus throw	61.89 m
2025	World Championships	Tokyo, Japan	3rd	Discus throw	66.96 m
2026	Commonwealth Games	Glasgow, United Kingdom	4th	Discus throw	63.32 m

== Personal bests ==
Outdoor

- Shot put – 17.22 (Papeete 2013)
- Discus throw – 71.48 (Allendale, Michigan 2024) NR, AR
- Hammer throw – 58.66 (Port Moresby 2015) NR

Indoor

- Shot put – 17.75 (Bowling Green 2011)
- Weight throw – 19.73 (Chicago 2016) NR
