= Sapolai Yao =

Papua New Guinean long-distance runner

Personal information
- Born: 15 September 1982 (age 43)

Sport
- Country: Papua New Guinea
- Sport: Track and field
- Event: 3000 metres steeplechase
Medal record
Men's Athletics
Representing Papua New Guinea
Pacific Games
Gold medal – first place	2007 Apia	3000 m Steeplechase
Gold medal – first place	2015 Port Moresby	3000 m Steeplechase
Silver medal – second place	2007 Apia	10000 m
Silver medal – second place	2007 Apia	Half Marathon
Silver medal – second place	2011 Nouméa	3000 m Steeplechase
Bronze medal – third place	2007 Apia	5000 m
Oceania Championships
Gold medal – first place	2010 Cairns	3000 m Steeplechase
Gold medal – first place	2013 Papeete	3000 m Steeplechase
Gold medal – first place	2015 Cairns	3000 m Steeplechase
Silver medal – second place	2006 Apia	3000 m Steeplechase
Silver medal – second place	2006 Apia	Half Marathon
Silver medal – second place	2015 Cairns	5000 m
Bronze medal – third place	2013 Papeete	5000 m
Bronze medal – third place	2013 Papeete	10000 m

Sapolai Yao (born 15 September 1982) is a Papua New Guinean long-distance runner. He competed in the 3000 metres steeplechase at the 2015 World Championships in China without reaching the final.

== Competition record ==
Year	Competition	Venue	Position	Event	Notes
Representing Papua New Guinea
1999	Oceania Youth Championships	Santa Rita, Guam	4th	1500 m	4:20.30
1999	Oceania Youth Championships	Santa Rita, Guam	2nd	3000 m	9:28.67
2001	Pacific Mini Games	Middlegate, Norfolk Island	2nd	5000 m	15:54.71
2003	Melanesian Championships	Lae, Papua New Guinea	1st	1500 m	4:04.8
2003	Melanesian Championships	Lae, Papua New Guinea	3rd	5000 m	15:49.2
2005	Melanesian Championships	Lae, Papua New Guinea	1st	5000 m	16:00.29
2005	Melanesian Championships	Lae, Papua New Guinea	1st	10,000 m	34:25.10
2005	Melanesian Championships	Lae, Papua New Guinea	1st	3000 m s'chase	9:50.5
2005	Pacific Mini Games	Koror, Palau	1st	5000 m	15:59.72
2005	Pacific Mini Games	Koror, Palau	1st	10,000 m	33:49.40
2006	Commonwealth Games	Melbourne, Australia	19th	5000 m	15:29.80
2006	Commonwealth Games	Melbourne, Australia	13th	3000 m s'chase	9:40.79
2006	Oceania Championships	Apia, Samoa	2nd	Half marathon	1:14:48
2006	Oceania Championships	Apia, Samoa	2nd	3000 m s'chase	9:49.56
2007	Melanesian Championships	Cairns, Australia	2nd	1500 m	4:05.25
2007	Melanesian Championships	Cairns, Australia	1st	5000 m	15:46.95
2007	Melanesian Championships	Cairns, Australia	1st	3000 m s'chase	9:43.07
2007	Pacific Games	Apia, Samoa	3rd	5000 m	15:45.09
2007	Pacific Games	Apia, Samoa	2nd	10,000 m	34:06.22
2007	Pacific Games	Apia, Samoa	2nd	Half marathon	1:13:49.5
2007	Pacific Games	Apia, Samoa	1st	3000 m s'chase	9:41.48
2010	Oceania Championships	Cairns, Australia	1st	3000 m s'chase	10:00.07
2010	Commonwealth Games	Delhi, India	21st	5000 m	16:21.88
2010	Commonwealth Games	Delhi, India	–	3000 m s'chase	DQ
2011	Pacific Games	Nouméa, New Caledonia	2nd	3000 m s'chase	9:53.33
2013	Oceania Championships	Papeete, French Polynesia	3rd	5000 m	15:43.03
2013	Oceania Championships	Papeete, French Polynesia	3rd	10,000 m	33:44.20
2013	Oceania Championships	Papeete, French Polynesia	1st	3000 m s'chase	9:49.67
2013	Pacific Mini Games	Mata-Utu, Wallis and Futuna	2nd	Half marathon	1:17:33
2013	Pacific Mini Games	Mata-Utu, Wallis and Futuna	2nd	3000 m s'chase	9:57.35
2015	Oceania Championships	Cairns, Australia	2nd	5000 m	15:44.47
2015	Oceania Championships	Cairns, Australia	1st	3000 m s'chase	9:39.74
2015	Pacific Games	Port Moresby, Papua New Guinea	1st	3000 m s'chase	9:38.89
2015	World Championships	Beijing, China	38th (h)	3000 m s'chase	9:51.09

== Personal bests ==
- 1500 metres – 4:11.48 (Brisbane 2004)
- 3000 metres – 8:45.55 (Brisbane 2006)
- 5000 metres – 15:28.94 (Brisbane 2006)
- 3000 metres steeplechase – 9:28.00 (Adelaide 2007)
