= Theo Piniau =

Papua New Guinean sprinter

Personal information
- Nationality: Papua New Guinea
- Born: 8 June 1993 (age 33) Kokopo
- Height: 1.72 m (5 ft 8 in)
- Weight: 61 kg (134 lb)

Sport
- Sport: Athletics
- Event: Sprints
Medal record
Men's Athletics
Representing Papua New Guinea
Pacific Games
Gold medal – first place	2015 Port Moresby	4x400 m relay
Silver medal – second place	2015 Port Moresby	400 m
Bronze medal – third place	2015 Port Moresby	200 m
Bronze medal – third place	2019 Apia	200 m
Oceania Championships
Gold medal – first place	2014 Avarua	400 m
Gold medal – first place	2014 Avarua	4x400 m
Silver medal – second place	2014 Avarua	200 m
Bronze medal – third place	2013 Papeete	400 m
- Updated on 23 August 2016

Theo Piniau (born 8 June 1993) is a Papua New Guinean track and field athlete. At the 2016 Summer Olympics he competed in the Men's 200 m.
