= Ongan Awa =

Papua New Guinean long-distance runner (born 2000)

Personal information
- Nationality: Papua New Guinean
- Born: Ongan Awa; 30 October 2000 (age 25) Goroka, Papua New Guinea

Sport
- Country: Papua New Guinea
- Sport: Athletics
- Event(s): Track, road and cross-country long-distance running

Achievements and titles
- Personal bests: 5000 m: 18:24.48 (Port Moresby 2015); 10,000 m: 39:07.97 (Port Moresby 2015); Cross-country; 10 km: 41:55.59 (Mangilao 2022)
Medal record
Women's athletics
Representing Papua New Guinea
Oceania Championships
Silver medal – second place	2015 Cairns	5000 m
Bronze medal – third place	2022 Mackay	5000 m
Pacific Games
Silver medal – second place	2015 Port Moresby	10000 m
Bronze medal – third place	2015 Port Moresby	5000 m
Oceania Cross Country Championships
Gold medal – first place	2022 Mangilao	Senior race

Ongan Awa (born 30 October 2000) is a Papua New Guinean long-distance runner. In track running, she is a two-time Oceania championship medalist in the 5000 metres. She won gold at the 2022 Oceania Cross Country Championships in Mangilao, Guam.
