= Donna Koniel =

Papua New Guinean athlete (born 1992)

Personal information
- Born: 20 August 1992 (age 33) East New Britain, Papua New Guinea

Sport
- Sport: Track and field
- Event(s): 400 m, 800 m, 400 metres hurdles
Medal record
Women's Athletics
Representing Papua New Guinea
Pacific Games
| Gold medal – first place | 2011 Nouméa | 4x400 m relay |
| Gold medal – first place | 2015 Port Moresby | 800 m |
| Gold medal – first place | 2015 Port Moresby | 400 m hurdles |
| Gold medal – first place | 2015 Port Moresby | 4x400 m relay |
| Gold medal – first place | 2019 Apia | 400 m hurdles |
| Gold medal – first place | 2019 Apia | 4x400 m |
| Silver medal – second place | 2011 Nouméa | 800 m |
| Silver medal – second place | 2015 Port Moresby | 400 m |
| Silver medal – second place | 2019 Apia | 800 m |
| Bronze medal – third place | 2011 Nouméa | 400 m hurdles |
Oceania Championships
| Gold medal – first place | 2012 Cairns | 400 m |
| Gold medal – first place | 2012 Cairns | 400 m hurdles |
| Gold medal – first place | 2014 Avarua | 4x100 m relay |
| Gold medal – first place | 2015 Cairns | 800 m |
| Gold medal – first place | 2015 Cairns | 4x400 m relay |
| Silver medal – second place | 2012 Cairns | 4x100 m relay |
| Silver medal – second place | 2012 Cairns | 4x400 m relay |
| Silver medal – second place | 2014 Avarua | 800 m |
| Silver medal – second place | 2014 Avarua | 4x400 m relay |
| Bronze medal – third place | 2012 Cairns | 800 m |
| Bronze medal – third place | 2014 Avarua | 400 m |
| Bronze medal – third place | 2014 Avarua | 400 m hurdles |
| Bronze medal – third place | 2015 Cairns | 400 m |
- Updated on 9 August 2019

Donna Koniel (born 20 August 1992) is an athlete from Papua New Guinea competing primarily in the 400 and 800 metres. She represented her country at the 2015 World Championships in Beijing without advancing from the first round.

In 2019, at the 2019 Pacific Games held in Samoa, she won the silver medal in the women's 800 metres event.

== Competition record ==
| Year | Competition | Venue | Position | Event | Notes |
Representing Papua New Guinea
| 2010 | Oceania Junior Championships | Cairns, Australia | 5th | 400 m | 60.69 |
| 2010 | Oceania Junior Championships | Cairns, Australia | 3rd | 800 m | 2:22.79 |
| 2010 | Oceania Junior Championships | Cairns, Australia | 4th | 400 m hurdles | 80.93 |
| 2011 | Pacific Games | Nouméa, New Caledonia | 2nd | 800 m | 2:16.80 |
| 2011 | Pacific Games | Nouméa, New Caledonia | 3rd | 400 m hurdles | 70.62 |
| 2011 | Pacific Games | Nouméa, New Caledonia | 1st | 4 × 400 m relay | 3:45.32 |
| 2012 | Oceania Championships | Cairns, Australia | 1st | 400 m | 56.17 |
| 2012 | Oceania Championships | Cairns, Australia | 3rd | 800 m | 2:16.41 |
| 2012 | Oceania Championships | Cairns, Australia | 1st | 400 m hurdles | 61.54 |
| 2012 | Oceania Championships | Cairns, Australia | 2nd | 4 × 100 m relay | 50.65 |
| 2012 | Oceania Championships | Cairns, Australia | 2nd | 4 × 400 m relay | 4:01.77 |
| 2013 | Pacific Mini Games | Mata-Utu, Wallis and Futuna | 2nd | 400 m hurdles | 61.37 |
| 2014 | Oceania Championships | Avarua, Cook Islands | 3rd | 400 m | 56.57 |
| 2014 | Oceania Championships | Avarua, Cook Islands | 2nd | 800 m | 2:18.52 |
| 2014 | Oceania Championships | Avarua, Cook Islands | 3rd | 400 m hurdles | 62.06 |
| 2014 | Oceania Championships | Avarua, Cook Islands | 1st | 4 × 100 m relay | 47.88 |
| 2014 | Oceania Championships | Avarua, Cook Islands | 2nd | 4 × 400 m relay | 3:59.52 |
| 2014 | Commonwealth Games | Glasgow, United Kingdom | 33rd (h) | 400 m | 58.40 |
| 2014 | Commonwealth Games | Glasgow, United Kingdom | 26th (h) | 800 m | 2:14.56 |
| 2015 | Oceania Championships | Hamilton, Bermuda | 3rd | 400 m | 54.89 |
| 2015 | Oceania Championships | Hamilton, Bermuda | 1st | 800 m | 2:09.58 |
| 2015 | Oceania Championships | Hamilton, Bermuda | 1st | 4 × 400 m relay | 3:52.66 |
| 2015 | Pacific Games | Port Moresby, Papua New Guinea | 2nd | 400 m | 54.29 |
| 2015 | Pacific Games | Port Moresby, Papua New Guinea | 1st | 800 m | 2:12.78 |
| 2015 | Pacific Games | Port Moresby, Papua New Guinea | 1st | 400 m hurdles | 58.22 |
| 2015 | Pacific Games | Port Moresby, Papua New Guinea | 1st | 4 × 400 m relay | 3:45.13 |
| 2015 | World Championships | Beijing, China | 42nd (h) | 800 m | 2:12.51 |

== Personal bests ==
Outdoor

- 200 metres – 25.58 (+0.5 m/s, Brisbane 2015)
- 400 metres – 54.29 (Port Moresby 2015)
- 800 metres – 2:08.77 (Gold Coast 2015)
- 400 metres hurdles – 58.28 (Port Moresby 2015)
