= Younis Bese =

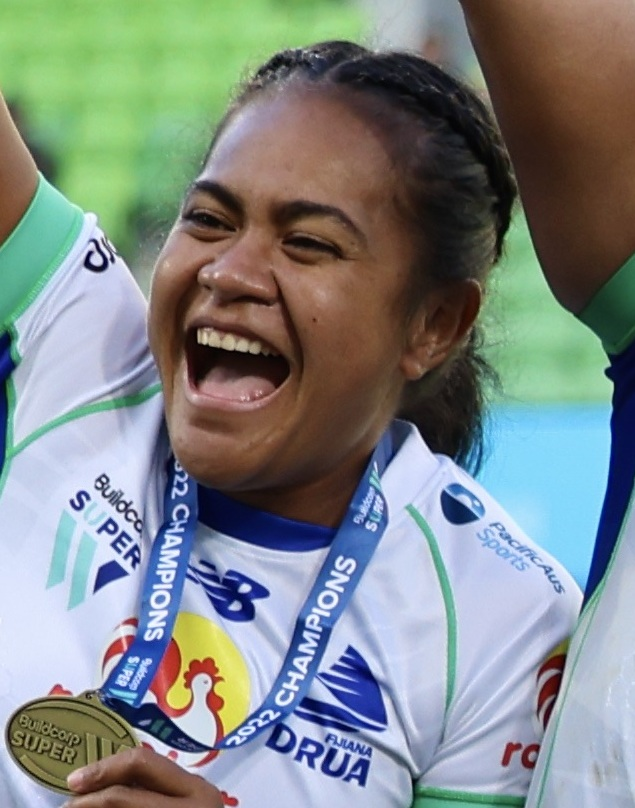
- Born: 7 July 1996 (age 30) Suva, Fiji

Rugby union career
- Position: Wing
Senior career
Years	Team	Apps	(Points)
2022	Fijiana Drua	2	(0)
International career
Years	Team	Apps	(Points)
2022	Fiji	1	(5)
- Sports career
- Sport: Athletics
- Events: 100 metres 200 metres

Sports achievements and titles
- Personal bests: 100m: 12.10s 200m: 25.02s
Medal record
Women's athletics
Representing Fiji
Oceania Championships
Silver medal – second place	2014 Rarotonga	100 m
Gold medal – first place	2014 Rarotonga	200 m
Pacific Games
Silver medal – second place	2015 Port Moresby	100 m
Silver medal – second place	2015 Port Moresby	200 m

Younis Bese (born 7 July 1996) is a Fijian rugby union player and former sprinter.

== Athletics career ==
Bese won a gold medal in the 200m at the 2014 Oceania Athletics Championships in the Cook Islands. She was then runner-up to Papua New Guinea's Toea Wisil in the 100m.

Bese competed at the 2014 Commonwealth Games in Glasgow, Scotland. She represented Fiji in the women's 100m and 200m events. She finished in 7th place in the 100m heats and in 6th place in the 200m heats.

Bese then won two silver medals for Fiji at the 2015 Pacific Games in the 100m and 200m events.

== Rugby career ==
In 2022, Bese was one of two replacement players that was called into the Fijiana Drua squad for round five of the Super W competition. She made her Super W debut off the bench against the Waratahs. She then made the starting line up against the Brumbies in the final round.

Bese was named in the Fijiana squad for two test matches against Australia and Japan in May 2022. She made her international debut for Fiji against Japan and scored a try.
