= Elodie Menou =

French Polynesian long-distance runner

Personal information
- Born: 9 March 1971 Paris, France

Sport
- Country: French Polynesia
- Sport: Athletics
Medal record
Women's Athletics
Representing Tahiti
Pacific Games
Bronze medal – third place	2015 Port Moresby	10,000m
Pacific Mini Games
Bronze medal – third place	2013 Mata Utu	Half-marathon
Oceania Athletics Championships
Silver medal – second place	2014 Rarotonga	5,000m
Silver medal – second place	2014 Rarotonga	10,000m
Gold medal – first place	2013 Papeete	10,000m

Elodie Menou (born 9 March 1971), also known as Elodie Mevel, is a French Polynesian long-distance runner who has represented French Polynesia at the Pacific Games and Pacific Mini Games. She is the mother of runner Loïc Mevel.

Menou was born in Paris, and moved to French Polynesia in the 2000s. She works as a freelance translator.

She won the 10,000 metres at the Polynesian Championships in 2015 and 2016. In 2017 she won the half-marathon.

At the 2013 Oceania Athletics Championships in Papeete she won gold in the 10,000 metres and set a new championship record. At the 2013 Pacific Mini Games in Mata Utu she won bronze in the half-marathon. At the 2015 Pacific Games in Port Moresby, Papua New Guinea, she won bronze in the 10,000 metres after Papua New Guinea's Marie Kua was disqualified.
