= Sharon Kwarula =

Papua New Guinean hurdler

Sharon Kwarula (born 8 June 1987) is an athlete from Papua New Guinea. She represented her country at the 2014 Commonwealth Games in hurdles and the women's relay and won the gold medal in hurdles at the 2015 Pacific Games.

== Life ==
Kwarula was born in Port Moresby, Papua New Guinea. She is a graduate of West Texas A&M University. In 2017 she returned to Papua New Guinea to work in sports. She continues with post-graduate study in international business at the University of New Mexico.
