= Helen Philemon =

Helen Philemon (born 28 August 1980) is a track and field athlete from Papua New Guinea. She represented her country at the 2010 Commonwealth Games and the 2014 Commonwealth Games.

== Life ==
Philemon was born in East New Britain Province. She represented Papua New Guinea at the 2010 Commonwealth Games in 100 metres and was a member of the 4 x 400 metre women's relay team. In 2014 she represented her country at the Commonwealth Games in 100 metres, 4 x 100 metre relay and 4 x 400 metre relay.
