= 2005 Melanesian Championships in Athletics =

III Melanesian Championships in Athletics
- Dates: April 22–24
- Host city: Lae, Morobe Province, Papua New Guinea
- Venue: Sir Ignatius Kilage Stadium
- Level: Senior
- Events: 31 (18 men, 13 women)

The 2005 Melanesian Championships in Athletics took place between April 22–24, 2005. The event was held at the Sir Ignatius Kilage Stadium in Lae, Papua New Guinea, in conjunction with the Papua New Guinea National Athletics Championships. Detailed reports were given for the OAA.

A total of 31 events were contested, 18 by men and 13 by women.

== Medal summary ==
Medal winners and their results were published on the Athletics Weekly webpage. Complete results can be found on the Athletics Papua New Guinea and for the first two days on the Oceania Athletics Association webpages.

=== Men ===
Event	Gold		Silver		Bronze	
100 metres (wind: -0.6 m/s)	Otis Gowa; Australia	10.81	Wally Kirika; Papua New Guinea	10.87	Anton Lui; Papua New Guinea	11.05
200 metres (wind: -0.9 m/s)	Otis Gowa; Australia	21.94	Waisea Finau; Fiji	22.10	Fabian Nuilai; Papua New Guinea	22.45
400 metres	Waisea Finau; Fiji	48.98	Fabian Nuilai; Papua New Guinea	49.22	Peter Tuccandidgee; Australia	49.43
800 metres	Isireli Naikelekelevesi; Fiji	1:53.5 CR	Chris Bais; Papua New Guinea	1:53.9	Joe Sipo; Papua New Guinea	1:55.2
1500 metres	Isireli Naikelekelevesi; Fiji	4:08.47	Russel Hasu; Papua New Guinea	4:09.04	Joe Sipo; Papua New Guinea	4:09.24
5000 metres	Sapolai Yao; Papua New Guinea	16:00.29	Rodney Gabirongo; Solomon Islands	17:21.60	Skene Kiage; Papua New Guinea	18:05.86
10000 metres	Sapolai Yao; Papua New Guinea	34:25.10	Chris Votu; Solomon Islands	36:09.10	Aimo Marave; Papua New Guinea	40:09.20
3000 metres steeplechase	Sapolai Yao; Papua New Guinea	9:50.5 CR	Rodney Gabirongo; Solomon Islands	10:13.5	Russel Hasu; Papua New Guinea	10:16.4
110 metres hurdles (wind: +0.7 m/s)	Ivan Wakit; Papua New Guinea	16.71	Diat Passinghan; Papua New Guinea	17.80	Jack Iroga; Solomon Islands	21.01
400 metres hurdles	John Wainiqolo; Fiji	54.87	Ivan Wakit; Papua New Guinea	54.97	Diat Passinghan; Papua New Guinea	62.61
High jump	Hapo Maliaki; Papua New Guinea; Rajendra Prasad; Fiji	2.00m CR			Sandy Katusele; Papua New Guinea	1.85m
Long jump	Eroni Tuivanuavou; Fiji	7.07m CR	Sandy Katusele; Papua New Guinea	6.52m	Timon George; Papua New Guinea	6.30m
Triple jump	Sandy Katusele; Papua New Guinea	13.61m CR	Noel Tamtu; Papua New Guinea	13.14m	Timon George; Papua New Guinea	12.52m
Shot put	Iosefo Vuloaloa; Fiji	13.58m CR	Chris Johns; Papua New Guinea	10.10m		
Discus throw	Iosefo Vuloaloa; Fiji	36.42m	Jack Iroga; Solomon Islands	24.87m	Chris Johns; Papua New Guinea	21.32m
Javelin throw	Iosefo Vuloaloa; Fiji	57.40	Simon Benari; Papua New Guinea	54.16	Chris Johns; Papua New Guinea	45.16
4 x 100 metres relay	Papua New Guinea; Wally Kirika; Anton Lui; Edward Buidal; Emmanuel Jarim	41.69	Fiji; Waisea Finau; Isireli Naikelekelevesi; Eroni Tuivanuavou; John Wainiqolo	41.94	Solomon Islands; Jack Iroga; Nelson Kabitana; Francis Manioru; Wycliff Osoa	42.68
4 x 400 metres relay	Fiji; Waisea Finau; Isireli Naikelekelevesi; Eroni Tuivanuavou; John Wainiqolo	3:17.40 CR	Solomon Islands; William Taloga; Jonah Hone; Wycliff Osoa; Nelson Kabitana	3:25.97	Vanuatu; Jean Marie Nikau; Rinnie Tarie Thomas; Jean Yves Kakasi; Sam Kaiapam	3:30.25

=== Women ===
Event	Gold		Silver		Bronze	
100 metres (wind: -0.7 m/s)	Mae Koime; Papua New Guinea	11.96	Toea Wisil; Papua New Guinea	12.42	Litiana Miller; Fiji	12.64
200 metres (wind: -0.8 m/s)	Mae Koime; Papua New Guinea	24.99	Toea Wisil; Papua New Guinea	25.70	Ulamila Racule; Fiji	26.07
400 metres	Mae Koime; Papua New Guinea	56.52	Toea Wisil; Papua New Guinea	57.28	Maria Kaupa; Papua New Guinea	58.05
800 metres	Salome Dell; Papua New Guinea	2:20.0 CR	Cecilia Kumalalamene; Papua New Guinea	2:21.9	Miriam Goiye; Papua New Guinea	2:23.9
1500 metres	Salome Dell; Papua New Guinea	5:05.97 CR	Miriam Goiye; Papua New Guinea	5:12.68	Merolyn Auga; Papua New Guinea	5:14.45
400 metres hurdles	Ledua Baker; Fiji	69.33				
Long jump	Soko Salaqiqi; Fiji	5.38m CR	Serah Dowara; Papua New Guinea	4.62m	Rachel Surab; Papua New Guinea	4.51m
Triple jump	Soko Salaqiqi; Fiji	11.48m CR	Betty Burua; Papua New Guinea	11.00m	Rachel Surab; Papua New Guinea	9.72m
Shot put	Winnifred Gela; Papua New Guinea	9.20m	Maggie George; Papua New Guinea	8.51m	Elizabeth Gaobata; Solomon Islands	7.83m
Discus throw	Winnifred Gela; Papua New Guinea	18.42m	Maggie George; Papua New Guinea	18.39m		
Javelin throw	Anike Gibson; Papua New Guinea	19.63m	Maggie George; Papua New Guinea	17.60m		
4 x 100 metres relay	Papua New Guinea A Joyline Nason; Mae Koime; Jancinta Lange; Toea Wisil	49.04	Papua New Guinea B	51.31	Papua New Guinea; Lae Team	51.32
4 x 400 metres relay	Papua New Guinea A Maria Kaupa; Toea Wisil; Salome Dell; Cecelia Kumalalamene	3:57.01 CR	Papua New Guinea; Simbu Team	4:01.85	Papua New Guinea B	4:11.54

== Medal table (unofficial) ==
* Host nation (Papua New Guinea)

Rank	Nation	Gold	Silver	Bronze	Total
1	Papua New Guinea*	17	20	18	55
2	Fiji	13	2	2	17
3	Australia	2	0	1	3
4	Solomon Islands	0	5	3	8
5	Vanuatu	0	0	1	1
Totals (5 entries)		32	27	25	84
