= 2006 Oceania Athletics Championships =

VIII Oceania Athletics Championships
- Dates: December 12–16
- Host city: Apia, Samoa
- Venue: Apia Park
- Level: Senior
- Events: 38 (20 men, 17 women, 1 mixed)
- Participation: 20 nations
- Records set: 4

The 2006 Oceania Athletics Championships were held at the Apia Park in Apia, Samoa, between December 12–16, 2006.

A total of 38 events were contested, 20 by men, 17 by women, and 1 mixed relay.

Except javelin thrower Victor Dao, athletes from New Caledonia were listed as guests, although they were reported as medal winners on the webpage of the Ligue de Nouvelle Calédonie Athlétisme (resulting in a total 7 medals in the open category, 3 gold, 1 silver, and 1 bronze).

== Medal summary ==
Key to tables: Results not published on Oceania Athletics results document for 2006 Championships

Complete results can be found on the webpages of the Oceania Athletics Association, and Athletics Samoa. Athletics PNG, and Athletics Samoa.

=== Men ===
Event	Gold		Silver		Bronze	
100 metres (wind: -0.3 m/s)	Henry Ben; Papua New Guinea	10.75	Moses Kamut; Vanuatu; Wally Kirika; Papua New Guinea	10.82		
200 metres (wind: +1.6 m/s)	Peter Tuccandidgee; Australia	21.65	Moses Kamut; Vanuatu	21.73	Gabirieli Muatavola; Fiji; Daniel Natusch; New Zealand	21.81
400 metres	Sam Rapson; New Zealand	48.03	Chris Walasi; Solomon Islands	48.62	Fabian Niulai; Papua New Guinea	49.16
800 metres	Aunese Curreen; Samoa	1:52.65	Isireli Naikelekelevesi; Fiji	1:55.30	Arnold Sorina; Vanuatu	1:55.57
1500 metres	Aunese Curreen; Samoa	4:04.09	Anthony McCourt; Australia	4:05.54	Derek Mandell; Guam	4:06.35
5000 metres	Brendan Whelan; Australia	16:01.97	Derek Mandell; Guam	16:18.83	Lavi Sam; Vanuatu	16:44.24
Half Marathon	Brendan Whelan; Australia	1:12:40	Sapolai Yao; Papua New Guinea	1:14:48	Philip Nausien; Vanuatu	1:16:57
3000 metres steeplechase	Tim Hodge; New Zealand	9:34.59	Sapolai Yao; Papua New Guinea	9:49.56	Om Halliday; Australia	9:55.16
110 metres hurdles (wind: -0.9 m/s)	Mowen Boino; Papua New Guinea	15.02	Avele Tanielu; Samoa	15.10	Inoke Finau; Tonga	16.72
400 metres hurdles	Mowen Boino; Papua New Guinea	51.62	Wala Gime; Papua New Guinea	53.17	Nick Kalivati; New Zealand	53.70
High jump	William Crayford; New Zealand; Joshua Hall; Australia	2.07m =CR			Rajendra Prasad; Fiji	1.95m
Long jump^{1.)}	Daniel Natusch; New Zealand	7.14m (wind: NWI)	Jay Stone; Australia	6.88m (wind: NWI)	Nathaniel Franklin; Australia	6.84m (wind: NWI)
Triple jump^{2.)}	Charles Nicholson; New Zealand	13.56m (wind: NWI)	Kuripitone Betham; Samoa	13.38m (wind: NWI)	Buraieta Yeeting; Kiribati	13.30m (wind: NWI)
Shot put	Stephen Lasei; Samoa	14.39m	Justin Andre; Guam	13.76m	Tim Rozborski; Guam	13.18m
Discus throw	Stephen Lasei; Samoa	45.75m	Marshall Hall; New Zealand	43.48m	Jerrod Avegalio; American Samoa	43.41m
Hammer throw	Justin Andre; Guam	50.03m	Brentt Jones; Norfolk Island	49.25m	Gilles Valdenaire; French Polynesia	41.02m
Javelin throw	Leslie Copeland; Fiji	67.28m	Victor Dao; New Caledonia	59.15m	Jerrod Avegalio; American Samoa	52.13m
Octathlon	Nathan Baart; Australia	5131pts	Rabangaki Nawai; Kiribati	4992pts	Inoke Finau; Tonga	4311pts
4 x 100 metres relay	Fiji; Matavesi Telawa; Jone Wainiqolo; Gabirieli Muatavola; Filipo Delai	41.73	Papua New Guinea; Fabian Niulai; Wally Kirika; Henry Ben; Anton Lui	42.01	Australia; Lars Hansen; Otis Gowa; Peter Tuccandidgee; Daley Duan	42.11
6km Cross Country	Om Halliday; Australia	26:48	Brendan Whelan; Australia	27:07	Derek Mandell; Guam	27:12

^{1.)}: The long jump event was won by Frédéric Erin from New Caledonia (listed as guest athlete) in 7.55m.
^{2.)}: The triple jump event was won by Frédéric Erin from New Caledonia (listed as guest athlete) in 15.77m.

=== Women ===
Event	Gold		Silver		Bronze	
100 metres (wind: 0.2 m/s)	Mae Koime; Papua New Guinea	11.79 CR	Toea Wisil; Papua New Guinea	12.03	Latai Sikuvea; Tonga	12.28
200 metres (wind: 0.8 m/s)	Monique Williams; New Zealand	23.72	Mae Koime; Papua New Guinea	24.29	Toea Wisil; Papua New Guinea	24.53
400 metres	Monique Williams; New Zealand	55.21	Mae Koime; Papua New Guinea	56.75	Toea Wisil; Papua New Guinea	57.26
800 metres	Betty Burua; Papua New Guinea	2:18.35	Cecilia Kumalalamene; Papua New Guinea	2:19.05	Salome Dell; Papua New Guinea	2:21.68
1500 metres	Lucy van Dalen; New Zealand	4:40.64				
5000 metres	Holly van Dalen; New Zealand	18:27.90	Faye Ondelacy; American Samoa	23:19.45		
Half Marathon	Faye Ondelacy; American Samoa	1:19.35	Patricia Gauquelin; French Polynesia	1:52.52		
100 metres hurdles (wind: -1.2 m/s)	Terani Faremiro; French Polynesia	16.08	Monique Lafaialii; Samoa	18.66	Melina Malatai; Samoa	20.91
400 metres hurdles	Chloe Butler; Australia	1:03.37	Alyssa Taylor; Australia	1:06.47	Gemma Radford; New Zealand	1:07.37
High jump	Marissa Pritchard; New Zealand; Casey Narrier; Australia	1.70m			Véronique Boyer; French Polynesia	1.61m
Long jump	Soko Salaniqiqi; Fiji	5.59m (wind: NWI)	Terani Faremiro; French Polynesia	5.52m (wind: NWI)	Margaret Teiti; Cook Islands	5.18m (wind: NWI)
Triple jump	Nneka Okpala; New Zealand	12.29m (wind: NWI)	Marissa Pritchard; New Zealand	11.69m (wind: NWI)	Soko Salaniqiqi; Fiji	11.66m (wind: NWI)
Shot put	Ana Po'uhila; Tonga	16.57m CR	Tereapii Tapoki; Cook Islands	14.81m	Margaret Satupai; Samoa	14.40m
Discus throw^{1.)}	Tereapii Tapoki; Cook Islands	52.83m	Ana Po'uhila; Tonga	52.48m	Margaret Satupai; Samoa	43.72m
Hammer throw^{2.)}	Jessica Charlesworth; New Zealand	43.70m	Siniva Marsters; Cook Islands	41.51m	Anna Harvey; New Zealand	38.64m
Javelin throw	Tereapii Tapoki; Cook Islands	45.85m	Tammy Baart; Australia	40.40m	Vanessa Wanai; French Polynesia	36.32m
4 x 100 metres relay	Papua New Guinea; Betty Burua; Mae Koime; Cecilia Kumalalamene; Toea Wisil	48.30	Australia; Sarah Busby; Sarah Mackaway; Bessie Hayes; Jennifer Tagney	48.64	New Zealand; Gemma Radford; Nicola Hely; Nneka Okpala; Monique Williams	48.94

^{1.)}: Glenda Polelei from New Caledonia (listed as guest athlete) was 3rd in the discus throw event in 45.70m.
^{2.)}: The hammer throw event was won by Elise Takosi from New Caledonia (listed as guest athlete) in 46.19m.

=== Mixed ===
Event	Gold		Silver		Bronze	
800 metres Medley relay	New Zealand; Nicola Hely; Daniel Natusch; Monique Williams; Sam Rapson	1:35.62	Papua New Guinea; Cecilia Kumalalamene; Levi Albert; Toea Wisil; Wala Gime	1:37.95	Tonga; Patiola Pahulu; Aisea Tohi; Latai Sikuvea; Uikelotu Ki Onehunga Palu	1:38.06

== Medal table (unofficial) ==
* Host nation (Samoa)

Rank	Nation	Gold	Silver	Bronze	Total
1	New Zealand (NZL)	13	2	5	20
2	Australia (AUS)	7	5	3	15
3	Papua New Guinea (PNG)	6	10	4	20
4	Samoa (SAM)*	4	3	3	10
5	Fiji (FIJ)	3	1	3	7
6	Cook Islands (COK)	2	2	1	5
7	French Polynesia (PYF)	1	2	3	6
8	Guam (GUM)	1	2	2	5
9	Tonga (TON)	1	1	4	6
10	American Samoa (ASA)	1	1	2	4
11	Vanuatu (VAN)	0	2	3	5
12	Kiribati (KIR)	0	1	1	2
13	New Caledonia (NCL)	0	1	0	1
13	Norfolk Island (NFK)	0	1	0	1
13	Solomon Islands (SOL)	0	1	0	1
Totals (15 entries)		39	35	34	108

== Participation (unofficial) ==
The participation of athletes from 20 countries could be determined from the published results.

- American Samoa
- Australia
- Cook Islands
- Fiji
- French Polynesia
- Guam
- Kiribati
- Marshall Islands
- Federated States of Micronesia
- Nauru
- New Caledonia
- New Zealand
- Norfolk Island
- Northern Mariana Islands
- Palau
- Papua New Guinea
- Samoa
- Solomon Islands
- Tonga
- Vanuatu
