= ʻAna Poʻuhila =

Tongan athletics competitor

Personal information
- Nationality: Tongan
- Born: October 18, 1979 (age 46) Neiafu, Tongatapu
- Height: 1.82 m (6 ft 0 in)
- Weight: 96 kg (212 lb)

Sport
- Country: Tonga
- Sport: Athletics
- Event: Shot put
- Club: Bays Cougars (New Zealand)
- Coached by: Didier Poppe
Medal record
Women's Athletics
Representing Tonga
(South) Pacific Games
Gold medal – first place	2011 Nouméa	Shot put
Gold medal – first place	2007 Apia	Shot put
Gold medal – first place	2003 Suva	Shot put
Silver medal – second place	2011 Nouméa	Discus throw
Silver medal – second place	2007 Apia	Discus throw
Silver medal – second place	2003 Suva	Discus throw
Bronze medal – third place	2011 Nouméa	Hammer throw
(South) Pacific Mini Games
Gold medal – first place	2009 Rarotonga	Shot put
Gold medal – first place	2009 Rarotonga	Discus throw
Gold medal – first place	2009 Rarotonga	Hammer throw
Gold medal – first place	2005 Koror	Shot put
Gold medal – first place	2001 Middlegate	100 m
Bronze medal – third place	2005 Koror	Discus throw
Bronze medal – third place	2001 Middlegate	Discus throw
Oceania Championships
Gold medal – first place	2006 Apia	Shot put
Gold medal – first place	2004 Townsville	Shot put
Gold medal – first place	2002 Christchurch	Shot put
Gold medal – first place	2000 Adelaide	Shot put
Gold medal – first place	2000 Adelaide	Javelin throw
Silver medal – second place	2006 Apia	Discus throw
Silver medal – second place	2002 Christchurch	Discus throw
Bronze medal – third place	2004 Townsville	Discus throw
Bronze medal – third place	2000 Adelaide	Discus throw
Bronze medal – third place	2000 Adelaide	Hammer throw
- Updated on 29 April 2013

ʻAna Kilistina Poʻuhila (born October 18, 1979, in Longoteme, Tongatapu, Tonga) is a Tongan athlete.

== Biography ==
She represented the Kingdom of Tonga in the shot put event during the 2008 Summer Olympics in Beijing. She had the honour of being the flagbearer for her country at the opening ceremony. Originally a sprinter, she is now known for breaking the national Tongan shot put record in 2008 during her European Olympic preparation tour with a put of 18.03 metres in Albertville.

As she threw over the Olympic qualifying distance of 17.20 metres ten times she qualified for the 2008 Olympics on merit. However, she did not advance beyond the qualification round as her put of 16.42 metres placed her in only the 27th position. She had previously competed in the 2004 Summer Olympics for the event of shot put, but her throw of 15.33 metres did not allow her to qualify for the final round.

On July 2, 2009, she broke the Tongan national record in hammer throwing, with a throw of 53,53m.

She placed 14th in the shot put qualifier of the 2012 Summer Olympics with a put of 15.80 m.

=== Personal best ===
Event	Performance	Wind	Venue	Date
100 metres	13.57	-0.2	Edmonton	August 5, 2001
Shot Put	18.03		Albertville	July 7, 2008
Discus Throw	53.10		Cook Island	August 24, 2009
Hammer throw	53.53		France	July 2, 2009
Javelin throw	45.45		Noumea New Caledonia	April 3, 2008

== Achievements ==
Year	Competition	Venue	Position	Event	Notes
Representing Tonga
2000	Oceania Championships	Adelaide, Australia	1st	Shot put	14.36 m
2000	Oceania Championships	Adelaide, Australia	3rd	Discus throw	38.41 m
2000	Oceania Championships	Adelaide, Australia	3rd	Hammer throw	35.29 m
2000	Oceania Championships	Adelaide, Australia	1st	Javelin throw	42.32 m
2001	South Pacific Mini Games	Middlegate, Norfolk Island	1st	Shot put	15.13 m
2001	South Pacific Mini Games	Middlegate, Norfolk Island	3rd	Discus throw	42.28 m
2002	Oceania Championships	Christchurch, New Zealand	1st	Shot put	15.66 m
2002	Oceania Championships	Christchurch, New Zealand	2nd	Discus throw	45.11 m
2003	South Pacific Games	Suva, Fiji	1st	Shot put	15.89 m GR
2003	South Pacific Games	Suva, Fiji	2nd	Discus throw	48.14 m
2004	Olympic Games	Athens, Greece	32nd	Shot put	15.33 m
2004	Oceania Championships	Townsville, Australia	1st	Shot put	14.89 m
2004	Oceania Championships	Townsville, Australia	3rd	Discus throw	45.49 m
2005	South Pacific Mini Games	Koror, Palau	1st	Shot put	16.92 m GR
2005	South Pacific Mini Games	Koror, Palau	3rd	Discus throw	45.69 m
2006	Oceania Championships	Apia, Samoa	1st	Shot put	16.57 m CR
2006	Oceania Championships	Apia, Samoa	2nd	Discus throw	52.48 m
2007	Pacific Games	Apia, Samoa	1st	Shot put	16.60 m
2007	Pacific Games	Apia, Samoa	2nd	Discus throw	48.92 m
2009	Pacific Mini Games	Rarotonga, Cook Islands	1st	Shot put	16.53 m
2009	Pacific Mini Games	Rarotonga, Cook Islands	1st	Discus throw	53.10 m
2009	Pacific Mini Games	Rarotonga, Cook Islands	1st	Hammer throw	50.70 m GR
2011	Pacific Games	Nouméa, New Caledonia	1st	Shot put	15.72 m
2011	Pacific Games	Nouméa, New Caledonia	2nd	Discus throw	48.22 m
2011	Pacific Games	Nouméa, New Caledonia	3rd	Hammer throw	47.27 m
2012	Olympic Games	London, Great Britain	30th	Shot put	15.80 m

== Honours ==
National honours

- Order of Queen Sālote Tupou III, Member (31 July 2008).
