= Mowen Boino =

Papua New Guinean hurdler (born 1979)

Personal information
- Nationality: Papua New Guinea
- Born: 16 December 1979 (age 46) Port Moresby, Papua New Guinea
- Height: 1.85 m (6 ft 1 in)
- Weight: 73 kg (161 lb)

Sport
- Sport: Athletics
- Events: 400 m, 400 m hurdles
- Club: QEII Track Club (AUS)

Achievements and titles
- Personal bests: 400 m: 48.08; 400 m hurdles: 50.37
Medal record
Men's athletics
Representing Papua New Guinea
(South) Pacific Games
Gold medal – first place	2003 Suva	400 m hurdles
Gold medal – first place	2003 Suva	4x400 m relay
Gold medal – first place	2007 Apia	400 m hurdles
Gold medal – first place	2011 Nouméa	110 m hurdles
Gold medal – first place	2011 Nouméa	400 m hurdles
Gold medal – first place	2011 Nouméa	4x400 m relay
Gold medal – first place	2015 Port Moresby	400 m hurdles
Gold medal – first place	2015 Port Moresby	4x00 m relay
Silver medal – second place	1999 Santa Rita	4x400 m relay
Silver medal – second place	2007 Apia	4x400 m relay
Silver medal – second place	2015 Port Moresby	110 m hurdles
Bronze medal – third place	1999 Santa Rita	400 m hurdles
Bronze medal – third place	2003 Suva	110 m hurdles
Bronze medal – third place	2007 Apia	110 m hurdles
(South) Pacific Mini Games
Gold medal – first place	2001 Middlegate	400 m hurdles
Silver medal – second place	2001 Middlegate	110 m hurdles
Silver medal – second place	2001 Middlegate	4x400 m relay
Bronze medal – third place	2001 Middlegate	400 m
Oceania Championships
Gold medal – first place	2002 Christchurch	400 m hurdles
Gold medal – first place	2002 Christchurch	800 m medley relay
Gold medal – first place	2006 Apia	110 m hurdles
Gold medal – first place	2006 Apia	400 m hurdles
Gold medal – first place	2008 Saipan	400 m hurdles
Gold medal – first place	2011 Apia	400 m
Gold medal – first place	2011 Apia	400 m hurdles
Gold medal – first place	2013 Pepeete	400 m hurdles
Silver medal – second place	2002 Christchurch	110 m hurdles
Silver medal – second place	2000 Adelaide	400 m hurdles
Silver medal – second place	2010 Cairns	400 m hurdles
Silver medal – second place	2015 Cairns	400 m hurdles
Bronze medal – third place	2015 Cairns	110 m hurdles
- Updated on 23 August 2016

Mowen Boino (born 16 December 1979) is a Papua New Guinean track and field athlete, who specialized in 400 metres and in 400 metres hurdles. He is a three-time Olympian and four-time national record holder for the 400 m hurdles. He also achieved his personal best time of 50.37 seconds at the 2006 Commonwealth Games in Melbourne, Australia.

Boino first competed at the 2000 Summer Olympics in Sydney, where he set a national record for Papua New Guinea in the 400 m hurdles, with a possible fastest time of 51.38 seconds. He continued to improve his athletic performance at the 2004 Summer Olympics in Athens, when he finished last in the fourth heat of the men's 400 m hurdles, by forty-one hundredths of a second ahead of his national record set from Sydney, with a time of 50.97 seconds.

At the 2008 Summer Olympics in Beijing, Boino competed again for the men's 400 m hurdles. He ran in the fourth heat, against seven other athletes, including defending champion Félix Sánchez of the Dominican Republic. Boino finished the race in sixth place by thirty-seven hundredths of a second (0.37) behind Sánchez, with a seasonal best time of 51.47 seconds.

== Personal bests ==
Event	Result	Venue	Date
100 m	11.72 s (NWI)	(Australia) Brisbane	21 May 2010
200 m	23.26 s (wind: +1.7 m/s)	(Australia) Brisbane	29 Mar 2014
400 m	47.97 s	(Australia) Canberra	25 Mar 2012
110 m hurdles	14.58 s (wind: +1.8 m/s)	(Wallis and Futuna) / (Wallis and Futuna) Mata Utu	6 Sep 2013
400 m hurdles	50.37 s	(Australia) Melbourne	21 Mar 2006

== International competitions ==
Year	Competition	Venue	Position	Event	Notes
Representing Papua New Guinea
1999	South Pacific Games	Santa Rita, Guam	10th (h)	400 m	50.82
1999	South Pacific Games	Santa Rita, Guam	3rd	400 m hurdles	52.81
1999	South Pacific Games	Santa Rita, Guam	2nd	4 × 400 m relay	3:14.47
2000	Oceania Championships	Adelaide, Australia	4th	400 m	48.99
2000	Oceania Championships	Adelaide, Australia	2nd	400 m hurdles	52.50
2000	Olympic Games	Sydney, Australia	8th (h)	400 m hurdles	51.38
2001	World Championships	Edmonton, Canada	6th (h)	400 m hurdles	51.82
2001	South Pacific Mini Games	Middlegate, Norfolk Island	3rd	400 m	49.67
2001	South Pacific Mini Games	Middlegate, Norfolk Island	2nd	110 m hurdles	15.65 (-3.0 m/s)
2001	South Pacific Mini Games	Middlegate, Norfolk Island	1st	400 m hurdles	53.66
2001	South Pacific Mini Games	Middlegate, Norfolk Island	2nd	4 × 400 m relay	3:18.98
2002	Commonwealth Games	Manchester, United Kingdom	28th (qf)	400 m	48.74 s
2002	Commonwealth Games	Manchester, United Kingdom	10th (h)	400 m hurdles	51.05
2002	World Cup	Madrid, Spain	9th	400 m hurdles	51.66
2002	Oceania Championships	Christchurch, New Zealand	4th	400 m	50.48
2002	Oceania Championships	Christchurch, New Zealand	2nd	110 m hurdles	15.52 (-3.6 m/s)
2002	Oceania Championships	Christchurch, New Zealand	1st	400 m hurdles	53.06
2002	Oceania Championships	Christchurch, New Zealand	1st	800 m medley relay	1:31.17
2003	Melanesian Championships	Lae, Papua New Guinea	3rd	400 m hurdles	56.4
2003	Melanesian Championships	Lae, Papua New Guinea	1st	4 × 400 m relay	3:20.4
2003	South Pacific Games	Suva, Fiji	7th	400 m	49.21
2003	South Pacific Games	Suva, Fiji	3rd	110 m hurdles	15.37 (-1.6 m/s)
2003	South Pacific Games	Suva, Fiji	1st	400 m hurdles	51.93
2003	South Pacific Games	Suva, Fiji	1st	4 × 400 m relay	3:11.43
2004	Olympic Games	Athens, Greece	7th (h)	400 m hurdles	50.97
2006	Commonwealth Games	Melbourne, Australia	13th (sf)	400 m hurdles	50.78
2006	Oceania Championships	Apia, Samoa	1st	110 m hurdles	15.02 (-0.9 m/s)
2006	Oceania Championships	Apia, Samoa	1st	400 m hurdles	51.62
2007	Melanesian Championships	Cairns, Queensland, Australia	4th	400m	48.71
2007	Melanesian Championships	Cairns, Queensland, Australia	1st	400 m hurdles	51.43
2007	World Championships	Osaka, Japan	6th (h)	400 m hurdles	52.45
2007	Pacific Games	Apia, Samoa	7th	400 m	50.03
2007	Pacific Games	Apia, Samoa	3rd	110 m hurdles	14.97(+1.3 m/s)
2007	Pacific Games	Apia, Samoa	1st	400 m hurdles	51.35
2007	Pacific Games	Apia, Samoa	2nd	4 × 400 m relay	3:11.96
2008	Olympic Games	Beijing, China	6th (h)	400 m hurdles	51.47
2008	Oceania Championships	Saipan, Northern Mariana Islands	1st	400 m hurdles	52.07
2010	Commonwealth Games	Delhi, India	4th (h)	400 m hurdles	51.40
2010	Oceania Championships	Cairns, Australia	2nd	400 m hurdles	51.84
2011	Oceania Championships (Regional Division West)	Apia, Samoa	1st	400 m	48.05
2011	Oceania Championships (Regional Division West)	Apia, Samoa	1st	400 m hurdles	51.88
2011	Pacific Games	Nouméa, New Caledonia	1st	110 m hurdles	14.95 (-0.7 m/s)
2011	Pacific Games	Nouméa, New Caledonia	1st	400 m hurdles	50.96 GR
2011	Pacific Games	Nouméa, New Caledonia	1st	4 × 400 m relay	3:12.34
2013	Oceania Championships	Papeete, French Polynesia	–	400 m	DNF
2013	Oceania Championships	Papeete, French Polynesia	1st	400 m hurdles	51.97
2013	World Championships	Moscow, Russia	33rd (h)	400 m hurdles	51.49
2013	Pacific Mini Games	Mata-Utu, Wallis and Futuna	1st	110 m hurdles	14.58 (+1.8 m/s)
2013	Pacific Mini Games	Mata-Utu, Wallis and Futuna	1st	400 m hurdles	53.34
2013	Pacific Mini Games	Mata-Utu, Wallis and Futuna	2nd	4 × 400 m relay	3:16.19
2014	Commonwealth Games	Glasgow, United Kingdom	—	400 m hurdles	DQ
2014	Oceania Championships	Rarotonga, Cook Islands	—	110 m hurdles	DQ
2015	Oceania Championships	Cairns, Queensland, Australia	3rd	110 m hurdles	14.92 (+1.4 m/s)
2015	Oceania Championships	Cairns, Queensland, Australia	2nd	400 m hurdles	52.19
2016	World Indoor Championships	Portland, United States	25th (h)	400 m	49.81
2018	Commonwealth Games	Gold Coast, Australia	20th (h)	400 m hurdles	51.61
