= Tereapii Tapoki =

Cook Islands discus thrower

Personal information
- Nationality: Cook Islands
- Born: 19 April 1984 (age 42) Mauke, Cook Islands
- Height: 1.70 m (5 ft 7 in)
- Weight: 94 kg (207 lb)

Sport
- Sport: Athletics
- Event: Discus throw
- Turned pro: 2004

Achievements and titles
- Personal best: Discus throw: 57.61 m (2006)
Medal record
Women's athletics
Representing the Cook Islands
(South) Pacific Games
Gold medal – first place	2007 Apia	Discus
Gold medal – first place	2015 Port Moresby	Discus
Silver medal – second place	2007 Apia	Shot put
Silver medal – second place	2015 Port Moresby	Shot put
Silver medal – second place	2019 Apia	Discus
Bronze medal – third place	2003 Suva	Shot put
Bronze medal – third place	2003 Suva	Discus
(South) Pacific Mini Games
Gold medal – first place	2017 Port Vila	Discus
Gold medal – first place	2013 Mata-Utu	Shot put
Gold medal – first place	2013 Mata-Utu	Discus
Silver medal – second place	2005 Koror	Discus
Bronze medal – third place	2017 Port Vila	Shot put
Bronze medal – third place	2009 Rarotonga	Shot put
Bronze medal – third place	2009 Rarotonga	Discus
Bronze medal – third place	2005 Koror	Shot put
Bronze medal – third place	2005 Koror	Javelin
Oceania Championships
Gold medal – first place	2004 Townsville	Discus
Gold medal – first place	2006 Apia	Discus
Gold medal – first place	2006 Apia	Javelin
Gold medal – first place	2008 Saipan	Discus
Gold medal – first place	2013 Papeete	Shot put
Silver medal – second place	2004 Townsville	Shot put
Silver medal – second place	2006 Apia	Shot put
Silver medal – second place	2011 Apia	Discus
Silver medal – second place	2013 Papeete	Discus
Silver medal – second place	2015 Cairns	Discus
Silver medal – second place	2017 Suva	Discus
Bronze medal – third place	2002 Christchurch	Discus
Bronze medal – third place	2011 Apia	Shot put
- Updated on 19 May 2015

Tereapii Tapoki (born 9 April 1984) is a Cook Islands discus thrower. At age twenty, Tapoki made her official debut for the 2004 Summer Olympics in Athens, where she competed in the women's discus throw. She placed fortieth in the qualifying rounds of the competition, with a throw of 48.12 metres.

At the 2008 Summer Olympics in Beijing, Tapoki improved her performance by successfully throwing the discus into the field on her third and final attempt, at 48.35 metres. Tapoki, however, failed to advance into the discus throw final, as she placed thirty-seventh overall in the qualifying rounds.

== Personal bests ==
- Shot put: 14.96 m NR – Nikao, Cook Islands, 11 October 2006
- Discus throw: 57.61 m NR – Auckland New Zealand, 11 November 2006
- Javelin throw: 45.85 m NR – Apia, Samoa, 14 December 2006

== Achievements ==
Year	Competition	Venue	Position	Event	Notes
Representing the Cook Islands
1999	Oceania Youth Championships	Santa Rita, Guam	4th	Shot put	11.06m
1999	Oceania Youth Championships	Santa Rita, Guam	1st	Discus	34.22 m
1999	Oceania Youth Championships	Santa Rita, Guam	5th	Javelin	29.58m
2000	Oceania Youth Championships	Adelaide, Australia	1st	Shot put	12.57 m
2000	Oceania Youth Championships	Adelaide, Australia	1st	Discus	38.23 m
2000	Polynesian Championships	Apia, Samoa	3rd	Shot put	12.36m
2000	Polynesian Championships	Apia, Samoa	2nd	Discus	40.38m
2001	World Youth Championships	Debrecen, Hungary	8th (q)	Shot put	12.30 m
2001	World Youth Championships	Debrecen, Hungary	9th	Discus	40.71 m
2001	South Pacific Mini Games	Middlegate, Norfolk Island	4th	Shot put	12.43m
2001	South Pacific Mini Games	Middlegate, Norfolk Island	4th	Discus	40.82m
2002	World Junior Championships	Kingston, Jamaica	15th (q)	Discus	36.75 m
2002	Oceania Championships	Christchurch, New Zealand	4th	Shot put	12.94m
2002	Oceania Championships	Christchurch, New Zealand	3rd	Discus	40.87 m
2003	South Pacific Games	Suva, Fiji	3rd	Shot put	13.91 m
2003	South Pacific Games	Suva, Fiji	3rd	Discus	46.46 m
2003	Universiade	Daegu, South Korea	9th	Shot put	14.12 m
2003	Universiade	Daegu, South Korea	15th	Discus	45.48 m
2004	Olympic Games	Athens, Greece	20th (q)	Discus	48.12 m
2004	Oceania Championships	Townsville, Australia	2nd	Shot put	14.58 m
2004	Oceania Championships	Townsville, Australia	1st	Discus	52.98 m CR
2004	Oceania Championships	Townsville, Australia	4th	Javelin	39.70m
2005	World Championships	Helsinki, Finland	9th (q)	Discus	50.92 m
2005	South Pacific Mini Games	Koror, Palau	3rd	Shot put	13.85 m
2005	South Pacific Mini Games	Koror, Palau	2nd	Discus	48.32 m
2005	South Pacific Mini Games	Koror, Palau	3rd	Javelin	43.78 m
2006	Commonwealth Games	Melbourne, Australia	11th	Discus	51.50 m
2006	Oceania Championships	Apia, Samoa	2nd	Shot put	14.81 m
2006	Oceania Championships	Apia, Samoa	1st	Discus	52.83 m
2006	Oceania Championships	Apia, Samoa	1st	Javelin	45.85 m
2007	World Championships	Osaka, Japan	27th (q)	Discus	50.35 m
2007	Pacific Games	Apia, Samoa	2nd	Shot put	14.90 m
2007	Pacific Games	Apia, Samoa	1st	Discus	53.17 m
2007	Pacific Games	Apia, Samoa	5th	Javelin	42.28 m
2008	Oceania Championships	Saipan, Northern Mariana Islands	1st	Discus	50.59 m
2008	Olympic Games	Beijing, China	37th (q)	Discus	48.35 m
2009	World Championships	Berlin, Germany	37th (q)	Discus	45.29 m
2009	Pacific Mini Games	Rarotonga, Cook Islands	3rd	Shot put	13.88 m
2009	Pacific Mini Games	Rarotonga, Cook Islands	3rd	Discus	48.46 m
2009	Pacific Mini Games	Rarotonga, Cook Islands	4th	Javelin	40.01m
2011	Oceania Championships (Regional Division East)	Apia, Samoa	3rd	Shot put	12.91 m
2011	Oceania Championships (Regional Division East)	Apia, Samoa	2nd	Discus	46.21 m
2011	Pacific Games	Nouméa, New Caledonia	5th	Shot put	13.12m
2011	Pacific Games	Nouméa, New Caledonia	4th	Discus	45.12m
2013	Oceania Championships	Papeete, French Polynesia	1st	Shot put	14.17 m
2013	Oceania Championships	Papeete, French Polynesia	2nd	Discus	49.98 m
2013	Pacific Mini Games	Mata-Utu, Wallis and Futuna	1st	Shot put	14.46m
2013	Pacific Mini Games	Mata-Utu, Wallis and Futuna	1st	Discus	48.48m
2015	Oceania Championships	Cairns, Australia	4th	Shot put	13.59m
2015	Oceania Championships	Cairns, Australia	2nd	Discus	50.83m
2015	Pacific Games	Port Moresby, Papua New Guinea	2nd	Shot put	14.31m
2015	Pacific Games	Port Moresby, Papua New Guinea	1st	Discus	48.70m
2017	Oceania Championships	Suva, Fiji	4th	Shot put	12.81m
2017	Oceania Championships	Suva, Fiji	2nd	Discus	44.83m
2017	Asian Indoor and Martial Arts Games	Ashgabat, Turkmenistan	5th	Shot put	13.39m
2017	Pacific Mini Games	Port Vila, Vanuatu	3rd	Shot put	12.75m
2017	Pacific Mini Games	Port Vila, Vanuatu	1st	Discus	47.11m
2018	Commonwealth Games	Gold Coast, Australia	13th (q)	Shot put	12.60m
2018	Commonwealth Games	Gold Coast, Australia	10th	Discus	46.01m
2019	Oceania Championships	Townsville, Australia	7th	Shot put	11.77m
2019	Oceania Championships	Townsville, Australia	6th	Discus	46.13m
2019	Pacific Games	Apia, Samoa	4th	Shot put	12.23m
2019	Pacific Games	Apia, Samoa	2nd	Discus	44.63m
