= Isireli Naikelekelevesi =

Fijian middle-distance runner

Isireli Naikelekelevesi (born 17 December 1976) is a Fijian former middle-distance runner who specialised in the 800 metres. He is the Fijian national record holder in that event.

Born in Suva, he represented his country at the Summer Olympics in 1996, 2000 and 2004. In 1996 he anchored a 4 × 400 metres relay team including Soloveni Nakaunicina, Henry Semiti and Solomone Bole, while in the latter two years he ran in the heats of the 800 m. He competed in the 800 m heats at the 2001 World Championships in Athletics and also appeared at the Commonwealth Games in 1998 and 2002 (reaching the semi-finals on his second attempt). He ran for Fiji at the IAAF World Cross Country Championships in both 1996 and 1998.

His greatest successes came at regional level. He began with a 5000 metres bronze at the 1994 Oceania Junior Athletics Championships. He won three back-to-back middle-distance doubles at the South Pacific Games (1995, 1999, 2003) and also claimed a 400 metres bronze and relay silver in 2003. He remains the Games record holder in the 800 m. At the South Pacific Mini Games, he won a middle-distance double and took steeplechase bronze. The following edition in 2001 brought a sweep from 400 m to 1500 m and a fourth gold in the relay. At the 2005 edition he was edged out in the 1500 m by Samoa's Setefano Mika, but retained his 800 m and relay titles.

At the Oceania Athletics Championships he was a mainstay of distance running for a decade. He won his first 5000 metres title at the 1996 Oceania Athletics Championships and also won silver in the 10,000 metres. He won the 800 m title in 2000, but was beaten into second by New Zealander Gareth Hyett in 2002. He was again 800 m runner-up in 2006 finishing behind Samoa's Aunese Curreen.

In his last major international events he took two middle-distance silver medals behind Curreen at the 2007 Pacific Games and 2008 Oceania Athletics Championships.

== Personal bests ==
- 400 metres – 48.86 (2001)
- 800 metres – 1:48.70 min (2004) NR
- 1500 metres – 3:53.22 min (2003)
- Mile run – 4:14.24 min (2004) NR
- 5000 metres – 16:42.3 min (1994)

All information from All Athletics and IAAF

== International competitions ==
Year	Competition	Venue	Position	Event	Notes
1996	IAAF World Cross Country Championships	Stellenbosch, South Africa	257th	Senior race	44:18
1996	Olympic Games	Atlanta, United States	6th (h)	4 × 400 m relay	3:10.67
1996	Oceania Athletics Championships	Townsville, Australia	1st	5000 m	15:54.65
1996	Oceania Athletics Championships	Townsville, Australia	2nd	10,000 m	35:27.94
1998	Commonwealth Games	Kuala Lumpur, Malaysia	5th (h)	800 m	1:50.66
1999	IAAF World Cross Country Championships	Belfast, United Kingdom	153rd	Senior race	51:11
1999	IAAF World Cross Country Championships	Belfast, United Kingdom	127th	Short race	15:15
2000	Olympic Games	Sydney, Australia	7th (h)	800 m	1:49.61
2000	Oceania Championships	Adelaide, Australia	1st	800 m	1:51.49
2001	World Championships	Edmonton, Canada	6th	800 m	1:50.74
2002	Commonwealth Games	Manchester, United Kingdom	8th (sf)	800 m	1:50.00
2002	Oceania Championships	Christchurch, New Zealand	2nd	800 m	1:54.11
2004	Olympic Games	Athens, Greece	7th (h)	800 m	1:49.08
2006	Oceania Championships	Apia, Samoa	2nd	800 m	1:55.30
2008	Oceania Championships	Saipan, Northern Mariana Islands	2nd	800 m	1:53.48
2008	Oceania Championships	Saipan, Northern Mariana Islands	2nd	1500 m	4:03.79
