= Athletics at the 2007 South Pacific Games =

Athletics at the XIII Pacific Games
- Dates: September 3–8
- Host city: Apia, Samoa
- Venue: Apia Park
- Level: Senior
- Events: 45 (23 men, 22 women)
- Participation: 20 nations

Athletics competitions at the 2007 Pacific Games were held at the Apia Park in Apia, Samoa, between September 3–8, 2007. A total of 45 events were contested, 23 by men and 22 by women. This year 6 games records were set (1 by the men and 5 by the women).

Out of the 135 medals given away Fiji won the most with 12 gold medals, 17 silver medals and 4 medals for a total of 33 medals. New Caledonia and Papua New Guinea tied in second, both winning 27 medals. The hosts (Samoa) came fifth, receiving only nine medals.

== Medal summary ==
Medal winners and their results were published on the Oceania Athletics Association webpage by Bob Snow.

Complete results can also be found on the Oceania Athletics Association webpage.

=== Men ===
Event	Gold		Silver		Bronze	
100 metres (wind: +0.7 m/s)	Jone Delai (FIJ)	10.66	Iowane Dovumatua (FIJ)	10.71	Wally Kirika (PNG)	10.74
200 metres (wind: +0.2 m/s)	Niko Verekauta (FIJ)	21.26 GR	Iliesa Namosimalua (FIJ)	21.48	Nelson Stone (PNG)	21.69
400 metres	Niko Verekauta (FIJ)	47.18	Iliesa Namosimalua (FIJ)	47.74	Nelson Stone (PNG)	48.16
800 metres	Aunese Curreen (SAM)	1:49.82	Isireli Naikelekelevesi (FIJ)	1:50.31	Arnold Sorina (VAN)	1:55.40
1500 metres	Aunese Curreen (SAM)	3:53.93	Isireli Naikelekelevesi (FIJ)	3:54.64	Arnold Sorina (VAN)	4:03.20
5000 metres	Aunese Curreen (SAM)	15:42.62	Georges Richmond (PYF)	15:43.98	Sapolai Yao (PNG)	15:45.09
10000 metres	Georges Richmond (PYF)	33:29.41	Sapolai Yao (PNG)	34:06.22	Sam Lavi (VAN)	35:05.47
Half Marathon	Georges Richmond (PYF)	1:11:16.4	Sapolai Yao (PNG)	1:13:49.5	Tutea Degage (PYF)	1:16:09.3
3000 metres steeplechase	Sapolai Yao (PNG)	9:41.48	Rodney Gapirongo (SOL)	10:17.52	Pierre Bourret (PYF)	10:23.40
110 metres hurdles (wind: +1.3 m/s)	Toriki Urarii (PYF)	14.51	Jovesa Naivalu (FIJ)	14.79	Mowen Boino (PNG)	14.97
400 metres hurdles	Mowen Boino (PNG)	51.35	Jone Wainiqolo (FIJ)	52.02	Wala Gime (PNG)	52.38
High jump	Rajendra Prasad (FIJ)	2.06m	/Ogun Robert (NCL)	2.03m	/Éric Reuillard (NCL)	1.94m
Pole vault	/Éric Reuillard (NCL)	4.40m	Jeffrey-Tamatoa Laibe (PYF)	4.20m	Toriki Urarii (PYF)	3.05m
Long jump	/Frédéric Erin (NCL)	7.71m (wind: 0.0 m/s)	Anasa Cakaunivalu (FIJ)	7.29m (wind: -1.3 m/s)	Eroni Tuivanuavou (FIJ)	7.20m (wind: +0.1 m/s)
Triple jump	/Frédéric Erin (NCL)	15.47m w (wind: +2.6 m/s)	Eugene Vollmer (FIJ)	14.99m w (wind: +4.8 m/s)	/Kainric Ozoux (NCL)	14.82m w (wind: +3.5 m/s)
Shot put	Shaka Sola (SAM)	16.77m	Stephen Lasei (SAM)	16.69m	/Daniel Kilama (NCL)	16.64m
Discus throw	/Bertrand Vili (NCL)	58.31m	Shaka Sola (SAM)	48.73m	/Daniel Kilama (NCL)	48.47m
Hammer throw	/Erwan Cassier (NCL)	56.16m	/Bertrand Vili (NCL)	55.73m	Faleono Seve (SAM)	48.85m
Javelin throw	(Wallis and Futuna) /Sosefo Panuve (WLF)	71.73m	Leslie Copeland (FIJ)	69.84m	/Mathieu Roulet (NCL)	67.61m
Octathlon	/Georgy Outurau (NCL)	5410pts	Jeffrey-Tamatoa Laibe (PYF)	4951pts	Harold Nair (FIJ)	4531pts
20 Kilometres Road Walk	Dip Chand (FIJ)	2:19.14	Pradeep Chand (FIJ)	2:19.20		
4 x 100 metres relay	Fiji; Jone Mudu; Iliesa Namosimalua; Iowane Dovumatua; Niko Verekauta	40.60	/New Caledonia; Kainric Ozoux; Frédéric Erin; Georgy Outurau; Paul Zongo	41.20	Solomon Islands; Nelson Kabitana; Jack Iroga; Francis Manioru; Chris Walasi	41.55
4 x 400 metres relay	Fiji; Iliesa Namosimalua; Isireli Naikelekelevesi; Gaberieli Waqavanua; Niko Verekauta	3:10.18	Papua New Guinea; Nelson Stone; Wala Gime; Fabian Niulai; Mowen Boino	3:11.96	Vanuatu; Arnold Sorina; Moses Kamut; Jimmy Kassiley; Sam Kaiapam	3:16.43

=== Women ===
Event	Gold		Silver		Bronze	
100 metres (wind: +0.1 m/s)	Makelesi Bulikiobo (FIJ)	11.55 GR	Mae Koime (PNG)	11.57	Toea Wisil (PNG)	12.00
200 metres (wind: +0.3 m/s)	Makelesi Bulikiobo (FIJ)	23.40 GR	Mae Koime (PNG)	23.86	Toea Wisil (PNG)	24.34
400 metres	Makelesi Bulikiobo (FIJ)	52.96	Toea Wisil (PNG)	55.15	Paulini Korowaqa (FIJ)	56.21
800 metres	Salome Dell (PNG)	2:12.98	Cecilia Kumalalamene (PNG)	2:16.35	Ann Mooney (PNG)	2:16.62
1500 metres	Salome Dell (PNG)	5:00.28	Heiata Brinkfield (PYF)	5:02.56	Cecilia Kumalalamene (PNG)	5:07.66
5000 metres	Akesa Drotini (FIJ)	18:37.65	Sophie Gardon (PYF)	18:41.14	Poro Gahekave (PNG)	18:48.06
10000 metres	Sophie Gardon (PYF)	38:48.45	Poro Gahekave (PNG)	41:26.48	Florence Tina Toada (SOL)	42:56.22
Half Marathon	Sophie Gardon (PYF)	1:24:20 GR	Manuella Heitz (PYF)	1:33:17	/Josiane Chipaux (NCL)	1:33:33
3000 metres steeplechase	Poro Gahekave (PNG)	11:48.74	Heiata Brinkfield (PYF)	12:13.77	Nelly Hagatora (SOL)	13:02.19
100 metres hurdles (wind: 0.9 m/s)	/Phœbé Wejieme (NCL)	14.49	Milika Tuivanuavou (FIJ)	14.71	Terani Faremiro (PYF)	14.95
400 metres hurdles	Sharon Henry (PNG)	64.32	/Phoebe Wejieme (NCL)	65.12	Salote Niulevu (FIJ)	69.39
High jump	Véronique Boyer (PYF)	1.70m	/Candice Soulisse (NCL)	1.67m	Terani Faremiro (PYF)	1.64m
Pole vault	Dolores Dogba (PYF)	2.95m	/Léa Colmas (NCL)	2.60m	/Chloé Colmas (NCL)	2.60m
Long jump	Soko Salaniqiqi (FIJ)	6.05m (wind: +0.5 m/s) GR	Makelesi Tumalevu (FIJ)	5.99m w (wind: +2.8 m/s)	Véronique Boyer (PYF)	5.62m (wind: +1.9 m/s)
Triple jump	Véronique Boyer (PYF)	12.06m (wind: -0.6 m/s)	Soko Salaniqiqi (FIJ)	11.83m (wind: -0.1 m/s)	Monique Lafaialii (SAM)	10.81m (wind: +0.5 m/s)
Shot put	Ana Po'uhila (TGA)	16.60m	Tereapii Tapoki (COK)	14.90m	Margaret Satupai (SAM)	13.60m
Discus throw	Tereapii Tapoki (COK)	53.17m	Ana Po'uhila (TGA)	48.92m	/Glenda Polelei (NCL)	47.90m
Hammer throw	/Vaikula Elise Takosi (NCL)	47.41m	/Bina Ramesh (NCL)	45.50m	Siniva Marsters (COK)	42.96m
Javelin throw	/Bina Ramesh (NCL)	53.34m	/Glenda Polelei (NCL)	52.50m	/Linda Selui (NCL)	52.30m
Heptathlon	Terani Faremiro (PYF)	4389	Milika Tuivanuavou (FIJ)	4117	Johanna Sui (PYF)	4006
4 x 100 metres relay	Papua New Guinea; Mae Koime; Toea Wisil; Ann Mooney; Raphaela Baki	45.99	Fiji; Soko Salaniqiqi; Makelesi Bulikiobo; Alena Vadrasamu; Makelesi Tumalevu	46.01	/New Caledonia; Florence Araguissokid; Phoebe Wejieme; Kamen Zongo; Marie-Claude Haluatr	48.75
4 x 400 metres relay	Papua New Guinea; Mae Koime; Ann Mooney; Salome Dell; Toea Wisil	3:40.55 GR	Fiji; Torika Odro; Paulini Korowaqa; Anameli Navukitu; Makelesi Bulikiobo	3:41.03	Solomon Islands; Joycelyn Taurikeni; June Fataea; Flory Liza; Pauline Kwalea	4:08.03

== Medal table (unofficial) ==
* Host nation (Samoa)

Rank	Nation	Gold	Silver	Bronze	Total
1	Fiji	12	17	4	33
2	/New Caledonia	9	8	10	27
3	French Polynesia	9	7	7	23
4	Papua New Guinea	8	8	11	27
5	Samoa*	4	2	3	9
6	Cook Islands	1	1	1	3
7	Tonga	1	1	0	2
8	/Wallis and Futuna	1	0	0	1
9	Solomon Islands	0	1	4	5
10	Vanuatu	0	0	4	4
Totals (10 entries)		45	45	44	134

== Participation (unofficial) ==
Athletes from the following 20 countries were reported to participate:

- American Samoa
- Cook Islands
- Fiji
- French Polynesia
- Guam
- Kiribati
- Federated States of Micronesia
- Nauru
- /New Caledonia
- Niue
- Norfolk Island
- Northern Mariana Islands
- Palau
- Papua New Guinea
- Samoa
- Solomon Islands
- Tonga
- Tuvalu
- Vanuatu
- /Wallis and Futuna
