= Moses Kamut =

Vanuatuan sprinter

Personal information
- Nationality: Vanuatu
- Born: 7 July 1982 (age 43) Loukatai, Tanna, Tafea Province
- Height: 1.72 m (5 ft 8 in)
- Weight: 74 kg (163 lb)

Sport
- Sport: Athletics
Medal record
Men's athletics
Representing Vanuatu
(South) Pacific Games
Silver medal – second place	2003 Suva	400 m
Bronze medal – third place	2011 Nouméa	4x400 m relay
Bronze medal – third place	2007 Apia	4x400 m relay
(South) Pacific Mini Games
Gold medal – first place	2005 Koror	100 m
Silver medal – second place	2005 Koror	200 m
Bronze medal – third place	2001 Middlegate	4x400 m relay
Oceania Championships
Gold medal – first place	2004 Townsville	800 m medley relay
Silver medal – second place	2006 Apia	100 m
Silver medal – second place	2006 Apia	200 m
Silver medal – second place	2004 Townsville	200 m
Bronze medal – third place	2004 Townsville	400 m
Bronze medal – third place	2002 Christchurch	400 m
- Updated on 28 April 2013

Moses Kamut (born 7 July 1982) is a ni-Vanuatu sprinter who specializes in the 100 and 400 metres.

He competed at the 2004 Summer Olympics, the 2006 Commonwealth Games and the 2008 Summer Olympics without reaching the final. In Beijing he finished 7th in his heat with a time of 10.81 seconds.

His personal best 100 metres time is 10.64 seconds, achieved in July 2005 in Koror. His personal best 400 metres time is 47.63 seconds, achieved in March 2005 in Sydney.

Kamut was the Olympic flag bearer for Vanuatu in the 2004 opening ceremony.

== Achievements ==
Year	Competition	Venue	Position	Event	Notes
Representing Vanuatu
2001	South Pacific Mini Games	Middlegate, Norfolk Island	3rd	4 × 400 m relay	3:22.37 min
2002	Oceania Championships	Christchurch, New Zealand	3rd	400 m	49.88 s
2003	South Pacific Games	Suva, Fiji	2nd	400 m	48.39 s
2004	Oceania Championships	Townsville, Australia	2nd	200 m	21.65 s w (wind: +3.8 m/s)
2004	Oceania Championships	Townsville, Australia	3rd	400 m	48.36 s
2004	Oceania Championships	Townsville, Australia	1st	800 m medley relay	1:34.86 min
2005	South Pacific Mini Games	Koror, Palau	1st	100 m	10.64 s (wind: +0.5 m/s)
2005	South Pacific Mini Games	Koror, Palau	2nd	200 m	21.67 s (wind: +1.7 m/s)
2006	Oceania Championships	Apia, Samoa	2nd	100 m	10.82 s (wind: -0.3 m/s)
2006	Oceania Championships	Apia, Samoa	2nd	200 m	21.73 s (wind: +1.6 m/s)
2007	Pacific Games	Apia, Samoa	3rd	4 × 400 m relay	3:16.43 min
2011	Pacific Games	Nouméa, New Caledonia	3rd	4 × 400 m relay	3:13.94 min

Olympic Games
Preceded by Mary-Estelle Kapalu	Flagbearer for Vanuatu; Athens 2004	Succeeded by Priscila Tommy
