= 2000 Oceania Athletics Championships =

- Dates: August 24–26
- Host city: Adelaide, South Australia, Australia
- Venue: Santos Stadium
- Level: Senior
- Events: 40 (21 men, 19 women)
- Participation: 19 + 10 guest nations nations

The 2000 Oceania Athletics Championships were held at the Santos Stadium in Adelaide, Australia, between August 24–26, 2000.

A total of 40 events were contested, 21 by men and 19 by women.

In preparation for the 2000 Summer Olympics in Sydney, athletes from 10 African countries participated as guests.

== Medal summary ==
Medal winners were published. Complete results can be found on the webpages of the Cool Running New Zealand newsgroup.

=== Men ===
Event	Gold		Silver		Bronze	
100 metres (wind: +2.8 m/s)	Peter Pulu; Papua New Guinea	10.46w	Leone Veresa; Fiji	10.72w	Reuben Apuri; Solomon Islands	10.74w
100 metres (Invitation/Exhibition) (wind: +0.9 m/s)	Ibrahim Meité; Ivory Coast	10.34	Nnamdi Anusim; Nigeria	10.37	Frank Nwakpa; Nigeria	10.43
200 metres (wind: +2.3 m/s)	Peter Pulu; Papua New Guinea	21.39w	Craig Bearda; New Zealand	21.81w	Leone Veresa; Fiji	21.85w
200 metres (Invitation/Exhibition) (wind: +1.1 m/s)	Enefiok Udo-Obong; Nigeria	20.80	Amrose Ezenwa; Nigeria	21.03	Ezrah Sambu; Kenya	21.09
400 metres	Jeffrey Bai; Papua New Guinea	48.50	Jeremy Dixon; New Zealand	48.81	Ivan Wakit; Papua New Guinea	48.83
400 metres (Invitation/Exhibition)	Hyginus Anugo; Nigeria	47.48	Philip Mukomana; Zimbabwe	47.49	Benjamin Youla; Congo	48.08
800 metres	Isireli Naikelekelevesi; Fiji	1:51.49	Aaron Coles; Australia	1:56.73	Gerard Solomon; Vanuatu	1:58.61
800 metres (Invitation/Exhibition)	Crispen Mutakanyi; Zimbabwe	1:51.08	Michael Bond; Australia	1:55.51		
1500 metres^{1.)}	Russell Hasu; Papua New Guinea	4:09.58	Peter Paul Enkae; Vanuatu	4:11.57	Gerard Solomon; Vanuatu	4:13.61
1500 metres (Invitation/Exhibition)	Julius Ogwang; Uganda	3:45.27	Youcef Abdi; Australia	3:45.45	Nick Howarth; Australia	3:45.90
5000 metres^{2.)}	Brent Butler; Guam	15:36.83	David Kanie; Papua New Guinea	15:43.68	Darren Peacock; Australia	15:49.91
10000 metres	Brent Butler; Guam	32:36.39	David Kanie; Papua New Guinea	32:38.13	McPherson Suharo; Solomon Islands	35:09.68
Half Marathon^{3.)}	David Kanie; Papua New Guinea	1:12:43	Darren Peacock; Australia	1:14:37	Karl Bernard; New Caledonia	1:14:55
3000 metres steeplechase	Primo Higa; Solomon Islands	9:58.06	Ketson Kabiriel; Northern Mariana Islands	12:15.35	Normanson Mobel; Northern Mariana Islands	13:25.36
110 metres hurdles^{4.)} (wind: +2.3 m/s)	Joseph Rodan II; Fiji	14.91w	Ivan Wakit; Papua New Guinea	15.03w	Aleki Toetu'u Sapoi; Tonga	15.14w
400 metres hurdles	Ivan Wakit; Papua New Guinea	52.40	Mowen Boino; Papua New Guinea	52.50	Aleki Toetu'u Sapoi; Tonga	53.57
High jump	Glen Peterson; Australia	2.00	Sandy Katusele; Papua New Guinea	1.95	Lorima Vunisa; Fiji	1.90
Pole vault^{5.)}	Éric Reuillard; New Caledonia	4.80	Warren Tavergeux; New Caledonia	4.10	Tokaikolo Latapu; Tonga	3.10
Long jump^{6.)}	David Lane; New Zealand	7.10 (wind: +0.7 m/s)	Joseph Rodan II; Fiji	6.99 (wind: +1.7 m/s)	Jean-Jacques Diela; New Caledonia	6.85 (wind: +0.9 m/s)
Triple jump^{7.)}	Fagamanu Sofai; Samoa	14.92 (wind: +0.8 m/s)	Jean-Jacques Diela; New Caledonia	14.65 (wind: +0.5 m/s)	Scott Clements; New Zealand	14.62 (wind: +1.2 m/s)
Shot put^{8.)}	Hohepa Poihipi; New Zealand	14.03	Motekiai Ta'ufa; Tonga	12.57	Brentt Jones; Norfolk Island	11.38
Discus throw^{9.)}	Hohepa Poihipi; New Zealand	47.85	Motekiai Ta'ufa; Tonga	39.42	Jonathan Rozborski; Guam	37.93
Hammer throw	Brentt Jones; Norfolk Island	55.01	Daniel Goulding; Australia	54.93	Andrew Ratawa; Fiji	40.87
Javelin throw	James Goulding; Fiji	68.37	Oren Dalton; New Zealand	63.59	Andrew Ratawa; Fiji	61.12
4 x 100 metres relay	Papua New Guinea	41.96	Fiji	42.78	Tonga	43.37
4 x 100 metres relay (Invitation/Exhibition)	Nigeria	39.85	Ivory Coast	39.87	Sierra Leone	40.61
4 x 400 metres relay	Papua New Guinea	3:18.56	New Zealand	3:25.84	Fiji	3:27.39
4 x 400 metres relay (Invitation/Exhibition)	Nigeria	3:07.09	Kenya	3:07.19	Zimbabwe	3:09.00

^{1.)}: The 1500 metres event was won by Michael Bond from Australia in 4:03.11 running as a guest.
^{2.)}: The 5000 metres event was won by Job Sikoria from Uganda in 14:57.62 running as a guest.
^{3.)}: The half marathon event was won by Job Sikoria from Uganda in 1:09:10, 2nd was Lucky Bhembe from Swaziland in 1:11:15.00, both running as guests.
^{4.)}: The 110 metres hurdles event was won by Moses Oyiki Orode from Nigeria in 14.34w (wind: +2.3 m/s) running as a guest.
^{5.)}: The pole vault event was won by Chris Lovell from Australia in 4.90m, 2nd was Tom Lovell from Australia in 4.90m, both competing as a guest.
^{6.)}: The long jump event was won by Idika Uduma from Nigeria in 7.54m (wind: +0.6 m/s), 3rd was Ike Olekaibe from Nigeria in 7.03m (wind: +1.5 m/s), both competing as a guest.
^{7.)}: The triple jump event was won by Oluyemi Sule from Nigeria in 15.88m (wind: +0.4 m/s), 2nd was Ike Olekaibe from Nigeria in 15.86m (wind: +0.8 m/s), both competing as guests.
^{8.)}: The shot put event was won by Chima Ugwu from Nigeria in 19.53m competing as a guest.
^{9.)}: The discus throw event was won by Chima Ugwu from Nigeria in 53.38m competing as a guest.

=== Women ===
Event	Gold		Silver		Bronze	
100 metres (wind: +1.3 m/s)	Litiana Miller; Fiji	12.03	Nicola Morris; New Zealand	12.10	Laurence Upigit; New Caledonia	12.13
100 metres (Invitation/Exhibition) (wind: +2.4 m/s)	Benedicta Ajidau; Nigeria	11.53w	Louise Ayetotche; Ivory Coast	11.55w	Kay Iheagwam; Nigeria	11.89w
200 metres (wind: +3.1 m/s)	Nicola Morris; New Zealand	25.14w	Litiana Miller; Fiji	25.32w	Ann Mooney; Papua New Guinea	25.33w
200 metres (Invitation/Exhibition) (wind: +4.0 m/s)	Omotayo Akinremi; Nigeria	23.47w	Rosemary Okafor; Nigeria	23.85w	Doris Jacobs; Nigeria	24.16w
400 metres^{1.)}	Mary Estelle Kapalu; Vanuatu	55.37	Ann Mooney; Papua New Guinea	55.97	Vasiti Vatureba; Fiji	57.39
800 metres^{2.)}	Rochelle Heron; New Zealand	2:14.26	Ann Mooney; Papua New Guinea	2:20.11	Corrie Minshull; Australia	2:22.42
1500 metres^{3.)}	Salome Tabuatalei; Fiji	5:15.11				
5000 metres^{4.)}	Vasa Tulahe; Tonga	19:58.34				
2000 metres steeplechase	Jacqui Falconer; New Zealand	7:10.86				
100 metres hurdles^{5.)} (wind: +2.0 m/s)	Laurence Upigit; New Caledonia	14.86	Brooke Rangi; New Zealand	14.93	Rosalei Tennant; Australia	15.04
400 metres hurdles^{6.)}	Mary Estelle Kapalu; Vanuatu	60.62				
High jump	Tatum Rickard; New Zealand	1.68	Brooke Rangi; New Zealand	1.65		
Pole vault	Nikki Beckett; New Zealand	3.20				
Long jump^{7.)}	Siulolo Liku; Tonga	6.15 (wind: +1.2 m/s)	Tatum Rickard; New Zealand	6.07 (wind: +1.4 m/s)	Laurence Upigit; New Caledonia	6.05 (wind: +1.2 m/s)
Triple jump^{8.)}	Tatum Rickard; New Zealand	11.87 (wind: +0.4 m/s)	Jessica Taoupoulou; New Caledonia	10.75 (wind: +0.5 m/s)	Taati Eria; Kiribati	10.22 (wind: -0.3 m/s)
Shot put^{9.)}	Ana Po'uhila; Tonga	14.36	Melehifo Uhi; Tonga	13.75	Siniva Marsters; Cook Islands	10.74
Discus throw^{10.)}	Melehifo Uhi; Tonga	47.04	Helen Wallis; Australia	41.34	Ana Po'uhila; Tonga	38.41
Hammer throw	Sharyn Tennent; Australia	47.42	Helen Wallis; Australia	43.63	Ana Po'uhila; Tonga	35.29
Javelin throw	Ana Po'uhila; Tonga	42.32	Latai Sikuvea; Tonga	39.49	Tracey Hawken; Australia	36.42
4 x 100 metres relay ^{11.)}	New Zealand	48.36	Fiji	48.46	Papua New Guinea	48.74
4 x 400 metres relay	New Zealand	3:54.19	Australia	4:27.62		

^{1.)}: The 400 metres event was won by Kudirat Akhigbe from Nigeria in 54.86 running as a guest.
^{2.)}: The 800 metres event was won by Léontine Tsiba from Republic of the Congo in 2:05.38, 2nd was Julia Sakara from Zimbabwe in 2:09.53, and 3rd Dupe Osime from Nigeria in 2:10.67, all running as guests.
^{3.)}: The 1500 metres event was won by Léontine Tsiba from Republic of the Congo in 4:23.12, 2nd was Catherine Webombesa from Uganda in 4:25.72, both running as guests.
^{4.)}: The 5000 metres event was won by Dorcus Inzikuru from Uganda in 16:12.0, 2nd was Samukeliso Moyo from Zimbabwe in 17:21.79, and 3rd Priscilla Mamba from Swaziland in 18:13.87, all running as a guest.
^{5.)}: The 100 metres hurdles event was won by Imeh Akpan from Nigeria in 13.99 running as a guest.
^{6.)}: The 400 metres hurdles event was won by Esther Erharuyi from Nigeria in 58.27 running as a guest.
^{7.)}: The long jump event was won by Chinedu Odozor from Nigeria in 6.39m (wind: +0.8 m/s), 2nd was Oluchi Elechi from Nigeria in 6.30m (wind: +1.0 m/s), both competing as guests.
^{8.)}: The triple jump event was won by Grace Efago from Nigeria in 12.75m (wind: +0.4 m/s), 2nd was Jane Denning from Australia in 12.56m (wind: +1.6 m/s), both competing as guests.
^{9.)}: The shot put event was won by Vivian Chukwuemeka from Nigeria in 17.67m, 4th was Alifatou Djibril from Togo in 12.87m, both competing as guests.
^{10.)}: In the discus throw event, Alifatou Djibril from Togo was 2nd competing as a guest.
^{11.)}: The 4×100 metres relay event was won by Nigeria in 45.57 running as guests.

== Medal table (unofficial) ==
* Host nation (Australia)

Rank	Nation	Gold	Silver	Bronze	Total
1	New Zealand (NZL)	11	8	1	20
2	Papua New Guinea (PNG)	8	7	3	18
3	Fiji (FIJ)	5	5	6	16
4	Tonga (TON)	5	4	6	15
5	Australia (AUS)*	2	6	4	12
6	New Caledonia (NCL)	2	3	4	9
7	Vanuatu (VAN)	2	1	2	5
8	Guam (GUM)	2	0	1	3
9	Solomon Islands (SOL)	1	0	2	3
10	Norfolk Island (NFK)	1	0	1	2
11	Samoa (SAM)	1	0	0	1
12	Northern Mariana Islands (NMI)	0	1	1	2
13	Cook Islands (COK)	0	0	1	1
13	Kiribati (KIR)	0	0	1	1
Totals (14 entries)		40	35	33	108

== Participation (unofficial) ==
The participation of athletes from 19 countries and 10 guest countries from Africa was reported. In addition, a couple of Australian athletes started as guests out of competition.

- American Samoa
- Australia
- Cook Islands
- Fiji
- Guam
- Kiribati
- Federated States of Micronesia
- Nauru
- New Caledonia
- New Zealand
- Norfolk Island
- Northern Mariana Islands
- Palau
- Papua New Guinea
- Samoa
- Solomon Islands
- (French Polynesia) /Tahiti
- Tonga
- Vanuatu

African guest countries:

- Congo
- Ivory Coast
- Kenya
- Mali
- Nigeria
- Sierra Leone
- Swaziland
- Togo
- Uganda
- Zimbabwe
