= List of Pacific Games records in athletics =

The Pacific Games records in athletics are set by athletes who are representing one of the Pacific Games Council member federations at either the Pacific Games or the Pacific Mini Games. Both games are quadrennial events. The Pacific Games began as South Pacific Games in 1963, while the Pacific Mini Games began as South Pacific Mini Games in 1981. They are held in the intervening years between the main games with a reduced sports program to allow also smaller nations to host an international sporting event.
These records based on a list published by Bob Snow on the Oceania Athletics Association webpage.

== Men's records ==
Event	Record	Athlete	Nation	Date	Games	Location	Ref.
100 m	10.31 (−0.8 m/s)	Banuve Tabakaucoro	Fiji	16 July 2019	2019 Pacific Games	Apia, Samoa	
200 m	20.53 (+1.5 m/s)	Banuve Tabakaucoro	Fiji	16 July 2015	2015 Pacific Games	Port Moresby, Papua New Guinea	
400 m	45.62	Steven Solomon	Australia	16 July 2019	2019 Pacific Games	Apia, Samoa	
800 m	1:48.43	Jack Lunn	Australia	28 November 2023	2023 Pacific Games	Honiara, Solomon Islands	
1500 m	3:50.27	Alain Lazare	New Caledonia	14 December 1987	1987 South Pacific Games	Nouméa, New Caledonia	
5000 m	14:15.12	Alain Lazare	New Caledonia	15 December 1987	1987 South Pacific Games	Nouméa, New Caledonia	
10,000 m	30:30.96	Alain Lazare	New Caledonia	24 August 1989	1989 South Pacific Mini Games	Nukuʻalofa, Tonga	
Half marathon	1:09:53	Georges Richmond	French Polynesia	12 July 2003	2003 South Pacific Games	Suva, Fiji	
Marathon	2:26:58	Alain Lazare	New Caledonia	19 December 1987	1987 South Pacific Games	Nouméa, New Caledonia	
110 m hurdles	14.19 (−1.7 m/s)	Mitchell Lightfoot	Australia	30 November 2023	2023 Pacific Games	Honiara, Solomon Islands	
400 m hurdles	50.86	Ian Dewhurst	Australia	19 July 2019	2019 Pacific Games	Apia, Samoa	
3000 m steeplechase	9:07.11	Alain Lazare	New Caledonia	16 December 1987	1987 South Pacific Games	Nouméa, New Caledonia	
High jump	2.21 m	Paul Poaniewa	New Caledonia	31 August 1979	1979 South Pacific Games	Suva, Fiji	
Pole vault	5.00 m	Thibaut Cattiau	/French Polynesia	29 August 1989	1989 South Pacific Mini Games	Nukuʻalofa, Tonga	
Pole vault	5.00 m	Éric Reuillard	/New Caledonia	3 September 2011	2011 Pacific Games	Nouméa, New Caledonia	
Long jump	8.12 m (+1.9 m/s)	Frédéric Erin	/New Caledonia	7 September 2011	2011 Pacific Games	Nouméa, New Caledonia	
Triple jump	16.10 m (+1.6 m/s)	Frédéric Erin	/New Caledonia	9 September 2011	2011 Pacific Games	Nouméa, New Caledonia	
Shot put	18.93 m	Tumatai Dauphin	French Polynesia	8 September 2011	2011 Pacific Games	Nouméa, New Caledonia	
Discus throw	58.31 m	Bertrand Vili	(New Caledonia) /	September 2007	2007 Pacific Games	Apia, Samoa	
Hammer throw	61.78 m	Laurent Pakihivatau	New Caledonia	17 August 1995	1995 South Pacific Games	Pirae, French Polynesia	
Javelin throw	78.96 m (Current design)	Jean-Paul Lakafia	New Caledonia	14 December 1987	1987 South Pacific Games	Nouméa, New Caledonia	
Javelin throw	84.74 m (Old design)	Jean-Paul Lakafia	New Caledonia	12 September 1983	1983 South Pacific Games	Apia, Western Samoa	
Octathlon	5382 pts	Karo Iga	Papua New Guinea	21–22 June 2022	2022 Pacific Mini Games	Saipan, Northern Mariana Islands	
Octathlon	100m (wind) / Long jump (wind) / Shot put / 400m / 110m H (wind) / High jump / Javelin / 1000m; 11.03 (−1.8 m/s) / 7.08 m (+2.7 m/s) / 10.30 m / 50.87 / 17.95 (−0.7 m/s) / 1.94 m / 50.50 m / 3:13.10						
Decathlon	7419 pts	Florian Geffrouais	New Caledonia	15–16 July 2019	2019 Pacific Games	Apia, Samoa	
Decathlon	100m / Long jump / Shot put / High jump / 400m / 110m H / Discus / Pole vault / Javelin / 1500m; 11.24 (+1.9 m/s) / 6.91 m (+0.3 m/s) / 14.44 m / 1.82 m / 50.88 / 15.11 (+1.2 m/s) / 42.99 m / 4.30 m / 53.65 m / 4:30.80						
20 km walk (road)	1:49:23	Dip Chand	Fiji	14 August 1997	1997 South Pacific Mini Games	Pago Pago, American Samoa	
4 × 100 m relay	40.15	Aminiasi Babitu; Jone Delai; Soloveni Koroi; Solomone Bole	Fiji	20 August 1997	1997 South Pacific Mini Games	Pago Pago, American Samoa	
4 × 400 m relay	3:09.55	Takale Tuna; Baobo Duaba; Kaminiel Selot; Subul Babo	Papua New Guinea	21 September 1991	1991 South Pacific Games	Port Moresby, Papua New Guinea	

== Women's records ==
Event	Record	Athlete	Nation	Date	Games	Location	Ref.
100 m	11.50 (+1.0 m/s)	Toea Wisil	Papua New Guinea	16 July 2019	2019 Pacific Games	Apia, Samoa	
200 m	23.40 (+0.3 m/s)	Makelesi Bulikiobo	Fiji	September 2007	2007 Pacific Games	Apia, Samoa	
400 m	52.66	Makelesi Bulikiobo	Fiji	9 July 2003	2003 South Pacific Games	Suva, Fiji	
800 m	2:10.53	Keely Small	Australia	16 July 2019	2019 Pacific Games	Apia, Samoa	
1500 m	4:26.06	Tillie Hollyer	New Zealand	30 November 2023	2023 Pacific Games	Honiara, Solomon Islands	
5000 m	17:45.37	Jordan Baden	Guam	7 July 2025	2025 Pacific Mini Games	Koror, Palau	
10,000 m	33:47.21	Nadia Prasad	New Caledonia	18 August 1995	1995 South Pacific Games	Pirae, French Polynesia	
Half marathon	1:24:20	Sophie Gardon	French Polynesia	September 2007	2007 Pacific Games	Apia, Samoa	
Marathon	2:54:02	Pauline Vea	Tonga	24 August 1995	1995 South Pacific Games	Pirae, French Polynesia	
100 m hurdles	13.17 (+0.1 m/s)	Brianna Beahan	Australia	18 July 2019	2019 Pacific Games	Apia, Samoa	
400 m hurdles	57.26	Loan Ville	New Caledonia	1 December 2023	2023 Pacific Games	Honiara, Solomon Islands	
3000 m steeplechase	11:07.55	Heiata Brinkfield	French Polynesia	6 September 2011	2011 Pacific Games	Nouméa, New Caledonia	
High jump	1.80 m	Daniele Guyonnet	French Polynesia	September 1979	1979 South Pacific Games	Suva, Fiji	
High jump	1.80 m	Véronique Boyer	French Polynesia/Tahiti	10 December 2001	2001 South Pacific Mini Games	Middlegate, Norfolk Islands	
Pole vault	3.70 m	Pascale Gacon	New Caledonia	13 July 2015	2015 Pacific Games	Port Moresby, Papua New Guinea	
Long jump	6.42 m (+0.6 m/s)	Samantha Dale	Australia	1 December 2023	2023 Pacific Games	Honiara, Solomon Islands	
Triple jump	13.26 m (+1.4 m/s)	Rellie Kaputin	Papua New Guinea	13 December 2017	2017 Pacific Mini Games	Port Vila, Vanuatu	
Shot put	17.34 m	Nuuausala Tuilefano	Samoa	27 November 2023	2023 Pacific Games	Honiara, Solomon Islands	
Discus throw	53.17 m	Tereapii Tapoki	Cook Islands	September 2007	2007 Pacific Games	Apia, Samoa	
Hammer throw	64.37 m	Alexandra Hulley	Australia	16 July 2019	2019 Pacific Games	Apia, Samoa	
Javelin throw	57.32 m (Current design)	Linda Selui	/New Caledonia	6 September 2011	2011 Pacific Games	Nouméa, New Caledonia	
Javelin throw	58.14 m (Old design)	Bina Ramesh	New Caledonia	20 August 1995	1995 South Pacific Games	Pirae, French Polynesia	
Heptathlon	5038 pts	Iammo Launa	Papua New Guinea	28–29 August 1989	1989 South Pacific Mini Games	Nukuʻalofa, Tonga	
Heptathlon	100m H / High jump / Shot put / 200m / Long jump / Javelin / 800m; 15.49 (−1.58 m/s) / 1.53 m / 12.25 m / 25.26 / 5.20 m / 49.80 m / 2:38.39						
20 km walk (road)	1:58:32	Angela Keogh	Norfolk Island	5 June 1999	1999 South Pacific Games	Santa Rita, Guam	
4 × 100 m relay	44.86	Litiana Miller; Makelesi Bulikiobo; Mereoni Raluve; Rachel Rogers	Fiji	12 July 2003	2003 South Pacific Games	Suva, Fiji	
4 × 400 m relay	3:40.55	Mae Koime; Ann Mooney; Salome Dell; Toea Wisil	Papua New Guinea	September 2007	2007 Pacific Games	Apia, Samoa	

== Mixed ==
Event	Record	Athlete	Nation	Date	Games	Location	Ref.
4 × 400 m relay	3:30.15	Daniel Baul; Patricia Kuku; Adolf Kauba; Isila Apkup	Papua New Guinea	8 July 2025	2025 Pacific Mini Games	Koror, Palau	

== Records in defunct events ==
Men's events

Event	Record	Name	Nation	Date	Games	Location	Ref.
20.2 Miles Road Race	2:08:59	Georges Richmond	French Polynesia/Tahiti	20 August 1997	1997 South Pacific Mini Games	Pago Pago, American Samoa	
Pentathlon	2953 pts	Niulolo Prescott	Tonga	13 July 1981	1981 South Pacific Mini Games	Honiara, Solomon Islands	
Pentathlon	6.80 m (long jump), 51.22 m (javelin), 24.24 s (200 metres), 30.62 m (discus), 4:57.60 min (1500 m)						

Women's events

Event	Record	Name	Nation	Date	Games	Location	Ref.
3000 metres	9:09.48	Nadia Prasad	New Caledonia	20 August 1995	1995 South Pacific Games	Pirae, French Polynesia	
80 m hurdles	12.1 h NWI	Keta Iongi	Tonga	16 August 1969	1969 South Pacific Games	Port Moresby, Papua New Guinea	
Pentathlon	3801 pts	Keta Iongi	Tonga	19/20 August 1969	1969 South Pacific Games	Port Moresby, Papua New Guinea	
Pentathlon	12.1 s (80 m hurdles), 9.16 m (shot put), 1.37 m (high jump), 5.05 m (long jump), 26.2 s (200 metres)						
