= Makelesi Bulikiobo-Batimala =

Fijian sprinter

Makelesi Batimala
Personal information
- Nickname: Ma
- Nationality: Fiji
- Born: Bulikiobo; 23 October 1977 (age 48) Nadi, Ba, Fiji
- Height: 1.81 m (5 ft 11 in)
- Weight: 65 kg (143 lb)

Sport
- Country: Fiji
- Sport: Running
- Event(s): 100 metres, 200 metres, 400 metres
- College team: Lelean Memorial School
Medal record
Women's athletics
Representing Fiji
(South) Pacific Games
Gold medal – first place	2007 Apia	100 m
Gold medal – first place	2007 Apia	200 m
Gold medal – first place	2007 Apia	400 m
Gold medal – first place	2003 Suva	100 m
Gold medal – first place	2003 Suva	200 m
Gold medal – first place	2003 Suva	400 m
Gold medal – first place	2003 Suva	4x100 m relay
Silver medal – second place	2007 Apia	4x100 m relay
Silver medal – second place	2007 Apia	4x400 m relay
(South) Pacific Mini Games
Gold medal – first place	2009 Rarotonga	100 m
Gold medal – first place	2009 Rarotonga	200 m
Gold medal – first place	2009 Rarotonga	400 m
Gold medal – first place	2001 Middlegate	100 m
Gold medal – first place	2001 Middlegate	200 m
Gold medal – first place	2001 Middlegate	400 m
Gold medal – first place	2001 Middlegate	4x100 m relay
Gold medal – first place	2001 Middlegate	4x400 m relay
Oceania Championships
Gold medal – first place	2002 Christchurch	100 m
Gold medal – first place	2002 Christchurch	200 m
Gold medal – first place	2002 Christchurch	400 m
Gold medal – first place	2002 Christchurch	800 m medley relay
Oceania Youth Championships
Gold medal – first place	1993 Canberra	400 m
- Updated on 29 April 2013

Makelesi Bulikiobo Batimala (born 23 October 1977) is a Fijian sprinter.

== Biography ==
Nicknamed the "Sprint Queen" by the Fiji Times and Fiji Village, she has represented her country in several international competitions, including the 2004 Summer Olympics in Athens. She won four gold medals at the 2003 South Pacific Games, in the 100m, 200m, 400m and 4 × 100 m relay events. She also won the women's 200m sprint at the Australian Athletics Championships in 2008.

While taking part in the 2007 World Athletics Championships, she qualified to represent Fiji at the 2008 Summer Olympics in Beijing. She was Fiji's flag bearer at the Games' opening ceremony.

As of 2007, she held the Fiji national record for the women's 100-metre sprint, at 11.66 seconds. which she broke 2 months later running 11.55 seconds at the 2007 Pacific Games, a record that has not been beaten since.

== Achievements ==
Year	Competition	Venue	Position	Event	Notes
Representing Fiji
1993	Oceania Youth Championships	Canberra, Australia	1st	400 m	60.94
2001	South Pacific Mini Games	Middlegate, Norfolk Island	1st	100 m	12.26 s (wind: +0.3 m/s)
2001	South Pacific Mini Games	Middlegate, Norfolk Island	1st	200 m	25.29 s (wind: -2.2 m/s)
2001	South Pacific Mini Games	Middlegate, Norfolk Island	1st	400 m	58.17 s
2001	South Pacific Mini Games	Middlegate, Norfolk Island	1st	4 × 100 m relay	47.84 s
2001	South Pacific Mini Games	Middlegate, Norfolk Island	1st	4 × 400 m relay	3:49.24 min
2002	Oceania Championships	Christchurch, New Zealand	1st	100 m	12.22 s (wind: -2.6 m/s)
2002	Oceania Championships	Christchurch, New Zealand	1st	200 m	24.21 s (wind: +1.5 m/s)
2002	Oceania Championships	Christchurch, New Zealand	1st	400 m	56.67 s
2002	Oceania Championships	Christchurch, New Zealand	1st	800 m medley relay	1:45.09 min
2003	South Pacific Games	Suva, Fiji	1st	100 m	11.9 s (ht)
2003	South Pacific Games	Suva, Fiji	1st	200 m	23.68 s (wind: -2.1 m/s) GR
2003	South Pacific Games	Suva, Fiji	1st	400 m	52.66 s GR
2003	South Pacific Games	Suva, Fiji	1st	4 × 100 m relay	44.86 s GR
2007	Pacific Games	Apia, Samoa	1st	100 m	11.55 s (wind: +0.1 m/s) GR
2007	Pacific Games	Apia, Samoa	1st	200 m	23.40 s (wind: +0.3 m/s) GR
2007	Pacific Games	Apia, Samoa	1st	400 m	52.96 s
2007	Pacific Games	Apia, Samoa	2nd	4 × 100 m relay	46.01 s
2007	Pacific Games	Apia, Samoa	2nd	4 × 400 m relay	3:41.03 min
2009	Pacific Mini Games	Rarotonga, Cook Islands	1st	100 m	11.97 s (wind: +0.1 m/s)
2009	Pacific Mini Games	Rarotonga, Cook Islands	1st	200 m	24.52 s (wind: +0.4 m/s)
2009	Pacific Mini Games	Rarotonga, Cook Islands	1st	400 m	55.71 s
