= Elise Takosi =

New Caledonian hammer thrower

Personal information
- Born: 7 November 1988 (age 37)

Sport
- Event(s): Hammer throw, discus throw, javelin
Medal record
Women's athletics
Representing New Caledonia
Pacific Games
Gold medal – first place	2015 Port Moresby	Hammer throw
Gold medal – first place	2011 Nouméa	Hammer throw
Gold medal – first place	2007 Apia	Hammer throw
Pacific Mini Games
Gold medal – first place	2013 Mata-Utu	Hammer throw
Silver medal – second place	2009 Rarotonga	Hammer throw

Elise Takosi (born 7 November 1988) is a track and field athlete from New Caledonia.

At the 2009 Pacific Mini Games (Rarotonga), Takosi won silver for hammer throw with a throw of 49.80 metres. At the 2013 Pacific Mini Games (Mata-Utu), she won gold for hammer throw, with a throw of 53.63 metres. She also placed fifth for both the discus throw (35.12 metres) and shot put (11.32 metres).

Takosi has won three gold medals for hammer throw at the Pacific Games (2007, 2011, and 2015). At the 2007 Pacific Games in Apia she won with a throw of 47.41 metres, at the 2011 Pacific Games in Nouméa, she had a throw of 50.13 metres, and at the 2015 Pacific Games in Port Moresby wi, also setting the record for the games.

Takosi holds the record for New Caledonia in Hammer throw, with her personal best of 54.08 metres, set on 13 June 2011 in Colmar, France. Her personal best for discus throw is 41.90 metres (set in Niort) and for shot put is 12.74 metres (set in Saran).

== See also ==
List of New Caledonian records in athletics
