= Mae Koime =

Papua New Guinean sprinter (born 1983)

Personal information
- Nationality: Papua New Guinea
- Born: 14 December 1983 (age 42) Kerema, Gulf Province
- Height: 165 cm (5 ft)
- Weight: 63 kg (139 lb)

Sport
- Sport: Athletics
Medal record
Women's athletics
Representing Papua New Guinea
(South) Pacific Games
| Gold medal – first place | 2007 Apia | 4x100 m relay |
| Gold medal – first place | 2007 Apia | 4x400 m relay |
| Silver medal – second place | 2007 Apia | 100 m |
| Silver medal – second place | 2007 Apia | 200 m |
| Silver medal – second place | 2003 Suva | 4x100 m relay |
| Silver medal – second place | 2003 Suva | 4x400 m relay |
| Bronze medal – third place | 2003 Suva | 400 m hurdles |
(South) Pacific Mini Games
| Gold medal – first place | 2005 Koror | 100 m |
| Gold medal – first place | 2005 Koror | 200 m |
| Gold medal – first place | 2005 Koror | 400 m |
| Gold medal – first place | 2005 Koror | 4x400 m relay |
| Silver medal – second place | 2005 Koror | 4x100 m relay |
| Silver medal – second place | 2001 Middlegate | 100 m |
| Silver medal – second place | 2001 Middlegate | 4x100 m relay |
| Silver medal – second place | 2001 Middlegate | 4x00 m relay |
Oceania Championships
| Gold medal – first place | 2010 Cairns | 4x100 m relay |
| Gold medal – first place | 2008 Saipan | 100 m |
| Gold medal – first place | 2008 Saipan | 200 m |
| Gold medal – first place | 2008 Saipan | 4x100 m relay |
| Gold medal – first place | 2006 Apia | 100 m |
| Gold medal – first place | 2006 Apia | 4x100 m relay |
| Gold medal – first place | 2004 Townsville | 100 m |
| Gold medal – first place | 2004 Townsville | 200 m |
| Gold medal – first place | 2002 Christchurch | 400 m hurdles |
| Silver medal – second place | 2006 Apia | 200 m |
| Silver medal – second place | 2006 Apia | 400 m |
- Updated on 29 April 2013

Mae Koime (born 14 December 1983) is a Papua New Guinean sprinter.

Described as "the fastest ever female sprinter in Papua New Guinea", as Papua New Guinea's "star sprinter", and as Oceania's "fastest woman", Koime has represented her country at the 2004 Summer Olympics, the 2006 Commonwealth Games, and the 2003, 2005 and 2007 World Championships in Athletics.

She set a national record for Papua New Guinea at the Athens Olympics when she ran the 100 metres with a time of 12.00 seconds.

Competing at the Oceania Grand Prix in June 2008, she finished first in the 100 metre sprint, with a time of 11.70 seconds, and in the 200 metre sprint, with a time of 24.11. Koime finished first overall at the international Grand Prix.

Koime represented Papua New Guinea at the 2008 Summer Olympics in Beijing competing at the 100 metres sprint. In her first round heat she placed sixth in a time of 11.68 which was not enough to advance to the second round.

== Achievements ==
| Year | Competition | Venue | Position | Event | Notes |
Representing Papua New Guinea
| 2001 | South Pacific Mini Games | Middlegate, Norfolk Island | 2nd | 100 m | 12.61 s (wind: +0.3 m/s) |
| 2001 | South Pacific Mini Games | Middlegate, Norfolk Island | 2nd | 4 × 100 m relay | 49.74 s |
| 2001 | South Pacific Mini Games | Middlegate, Norfolk Island | 2nd | 4 × 400 m relay | 4:07.15 min |
| 2002 | World Junior Championships | Kingston, Jamaica | 21st (sf) | 100m | 12.17 s (wind: +0.7 m/s) |
| 2002 | Oceania Championships | Christchurch, New Zealand | 1st | 400 m hurdles | 69.15 s |
| 2003 | South Pacific Games | Suva, Fiji | 3rd | 400 m hurdles | 64.16 s |
| 2003 | South Pacific Games | Suva, Fiji | 2nd | 4 × 100 m relay | 48.95 s |
| 2003 | South Pacific Games | Suva, Fiji | 2nd | 4 × 400 m relay | 4:04.83 min |
| 2004 | Oceania Championships | Townsville, Australia | 1st | 100 m | 12.02 s w (wind: +2.3 m/s) |
| 2004 | Oceania Championships | Townsville, Australia | 1st | 200 m | 24.68 s (wind: +0.4 m/s) |
| 2005 | South Pacific Mini Games | Koror, Palau | 1st | 100 m | 12.03 s (wind: +0.1 m/s) |
| 2005 | South Pacific Mini Games | Koror, Palau | 1st | 200 m | 24.69 s w (wind: +2.1 m/s) |
| 2005 | South Pacific Mini Games | Koror, Palau | 1st | 400 m | 57.10 s |
| 2005 | South Pacific Mini Games | Koror, Palau | 2nd | 4 × 100 m relay | 49.16 s |
| 2005 | South Pacific Mini Games | Koror, Palau | 1st | 4 × 400 m relay | 3:58.97 min |
| 2006 | Oceania Championships | Apia, Samoa | 1st | 100 m | 11.79 s (wind: +0.2 m/s) CR |
| 2006 | Oceania Championships | Apia, Samoa | 2nd | 200 m | 24.29 s (wind: +0.8 m/s) |
| 2006 | Oceania Championships | Apia, Samoa | 2nd | 400 m | 56.75 s |
| 2006 | Oceania Championships | Apia, Samoa | 1st | 4 × 100 m relay | 48.30 s |
| 2007 | Pacific Games | Apia, Samoa | 2nd | 100 m | 11.57 s (wind: +0.1 m/s) |
| 2007 | Pacific Games | Apia, Samoa | 2nd | 200 m | 23.86 s (wind: +0.3 m/s) |
| 2007 | Pacific Games | Apia, Samoa | 1st | 4 × 100 m relay | 45.99 s |
| 2007 | Pacific Games | Apia, Samoa | 1st | 4 × 400 m relay | 3:40.55 min GR |
| 2008 | Oceania Championships | Saipan, Northern Mariana Islands | 1st | 100 m | 11.66 s (wind: -1.2 m/s) CR |
| 2008 | Oceania Championships | Saipan, Northern Mariana Islands | 1st | 200 m | 24.11 s (wind: -2.1 m/s) |
| 2008 | Oceania Championships | Saipan, Northern Mariana Islands | 1st | 4 × 100 m relay | 47.27 s |
| 2010 | Oceania Championships | Cairns, Australia | 1st | 4 × 100 m relay | 46.86 s CR |
