= Aunese Curreen =

Samoan middle-distance runner (born 1981)

Personal information
- Born: 23 December 1981 (age 44) Motootua, Samoa
- Height: 1.73 m (5 ft 8 in)
- Weight: 65 kg (143 lb)

Sport
- Country: Samoa
- Sport: Athletics
- Event: Middle distance running
- Club: North Harbour Bays Athletics (NZL)

Achievements and titles
- Personal bests: 800 m: 1:47.45 (2008); 1500 m: 3:50.24 (2008)
Medal record
Men's Athletics
Representing Samoa
Pacific Games
Gold medal – first place	2007 Apia	800 m
Gold medal – first place	2007 Apia	1500 m
Gold medal – first place	2007 Apia	5000 m
Oceania Championships
Gold medal – first place	2006 Apia	800 m
Gold medal – first place	2006 Apia	1500 m
Gold medal – first place	2008 Saipan	800 m
Gold medal – first place	2008 Saipan	1500 m
Gold medal – first place	2008 Saipan	6km Cross country
- Updated on 27 April 2013

Aunese Curreen (born Setefano Mika, 23 December 1981) is a Samoan middle-distance runner, who specialized in the 800 metres. He is currently a member of the North Harbour Bays Athletics Club in Auckland, New Zealand.

Curreen represented Samoa at the 2008 Summer Olympics in Beijing, where he competed for the men's 800 metres. He ran in the fifth heat against six other athletes, including Sudan's Ismail Ahmed Ismail, who eventually won the silver medal in the final. He finished the race in sixth place by three hundredths of a second (0.03) behind South Africa's Samson Ngoepe, with a national record and personal best time of 1:47.45. Curreen, however, failed to advance into the semi-finals, as he placed twenty-ninth overall, and was ranked farther below two mandatory slots for the next round.

== Achievements ==
Year	Competition	Venue	Position	Event	Notes
Representing Samoa
2000	Oceania Youth Championships	Adelaide, Australia	2nd	800 m	2:01.14 min
2000	Oceania Youth Championships	Adelaide, Australia	1st	1500 m	4:20.93 min
2000	World Junior Championships	Santiago, Chile	28th (h)	800m	2:02.72
2000	World Junior Championships	Santiago, Chile	33rd (h)	1500m	4:15.37
2001	South Pacific Mini Games	Middlegate, Norfolk Island	3rd	800 m	1:57.62 min
2001	South Pacific Mini Games	Middlegate, Norfolk Island	2nd	1500 m	4:10.30 min
2002	World Junior Championships	Kingston, Jamaica	28th (h) / DQ	1500m	4:08.56
2002	Oceania Youth Championships	Christchurch, New Zealand	2nd	800 m	1:57.56 min
2002	Oceania Youth Championships	Christchurch, New Zealand	3rd	1500 m	4:28.83 min
2003	South Pacific Games	Suva, Fiji	3rd	1500 m	4:09.07 min
2004	World Junior Championships	Grosseto, Italy	31st (h) / DQ	1500m	4:03.03
2005	South Pacific Mini Games	Koror, Palau	2nd	800 m	1:53.68 min
2005	South Pacific Mini Games	Koror, Palau	1st	1500 m	4:01.33 min
2006	Oceania Championships	Apia, Samoa	1st	800 m	1:52.65 min
2006	Oceania Championships	Apia, Samoa	1st	1500 m	4:04.09 min
2007	Pacific Games	Apia, Samoa	1st	800 m	1:49.82 min
2007	Pacific Games	Apia, Samoa	1st	1500 m	3:53.93 min
2007	Pacific Games	Apia, Samoa	1st	5000 m	15:42.62 min
2008	Oceania Championships	Saipan, Northern Mariana Islands	1st	800 m	1:51.16 min
2008	Oceania Championships	Saipan, Northern Mariana Islands	1st	1500 m	3:58.76 min
2008	Oceania Championships	Saipan, Northern Mariana Islands	1st	6 km Cross country	21:05 min
