= Selema Sione =

Personal information
- Born: 18 July 1982

Sport
- Country: Wallis and Futuna
- Sport: Shot put / Javelin throw
Medal record
Women's Shot put / Javelin throw
Representing Wallis and Futuna
Pacific Games
Silver medal – second place	2003 Suva	Shot put
Silver medal – second place	2003 Suva	Javelin

Selema Sione (born 18 July 1982) is a Wallisian athlete who has represented Wallis and Futuna at the Pacific Games.

Sione has previously won gold and silver medals in the javelin and shot put in the French championships.

At the 2003 Pacific Games in Suva she won silver in the shot put and javelin.
