= Anton Lui =

Papua New Guinean sprinter

Personal information
- Nationality: Papua New Guinea
- Born: July 27, 1985 (age 40) Rabaul, East New Britain
- Height: 163 cm (5.35 ft)
- Weight: 61 kg (134 lb)

Sport
- Event: Athletics
Medal record
Men's athletics
Representing Papua New Guinea
(South) Pacific Mini Games
Gold medal – first place	2005 Koror	4x100 m relay
Oceania Championships
Silver medal – second place	2006 Apia	4x100 m relay
- Updated on 29 April 2013

Anton Lui (born July 27, 1985, in Rabaul, East New Britain) is a sprinter from Papua New Guinea.

== Achievements ==
Year	Competition	Venue	Position	Event	Notes
Representing Papua New Guinea
2004	World Junior Championships	Grosseto, Italy	36th (h)	100m	10.82 (wind: +1.8 m/s)
2005	South Pacific Mini Games	Koror, Palau	1st	4 × 100 m relay	41.92 s
2006	Oceania Championships	Apia, Samoa	2nd	4 × 100 m relay	42.01 s
