= Brooke Rangi =

New Zealand footballer

Personal information
- Full name: Brooke Rawinia Stilgoe
- Birth name: Brooke Rawinia Rangi
- Date of birth: 7 September 1982
- Date of death: 20 August 2024 (aged 41)
- Place of death: Whakatāne, New Zealand

International career
Years	Team	Apps	(Gls)
2004	New Zealand	3	(0)
Medal record
Women's athletics
Representing New Zealand
Oceania Championships
Silver medal – second place	2000 Adelaide	100 m hurdles
Silver medal – second place	2000 Adelaide	High jump

Brooke Rawinia Stilgoe (née Rangi; 7 September 1982 – 20 August 2024) was a New Zealand association football player and track and field athlete. She played three matches for the New Zealand women's national football team, and won two silver medals, in the high jump and 100-metre hurdles, representing her country at the 2000 Oceania Athletics Championships.

== Football career ==
Rangi made her Football Ferns début in a 0–2 loss to Australia on 18 February 2004, and finished her international career with three caps to her credit.

== Track and field career ==
Rangi represented her country in athletics.

Year	Competition	Venue	Position	Event	Notes
Representing New Zealand
2000	Oceania Championships	Adelaide, Australia	2nd	100 m hurdles	14.93 s (wind: +2.0 m/s)
2000	Oceania Championships	Adelaide, Australia	2nd	High jump	1.65 m

== Later life and death ==
Rangi married Terry Stilgoe, and the couple had three children. She was diagnosed with brain cancer in 2021 while living in Australia. She returned to her home town of Whakatāne in April 2024, and died there later that year on 20 August, at the age of 41. She was buried at Hillcrest Cemetery.
