= 2002 Oceania Athletics Championships =

VI Oceania Athletics Championships
- Dates: December 12–14
- Host city: Christchurch, New Zealand
- Venue: Queen Elizabeth II Park
- Level: Senior
- Events: 39 (20 men, 19 women)
- Participation: 16 nations
- Records set: 6

The 2002 Oceania Athletics Championships were held at the Queen Elizabeth II Park in Christchurch, New Zealand, between December 12–14, 2002.

A total of 39 events were contested, 20 by men and 19 by women.

== Medal summary ==
Medal winners were published. Complete results can be found in the Cool Running New Zealand newsgroup.

=== Men ===
Event	Gold		Silver		Bronze	
100 metres (wind: -1.6 m/s)	Peter Pulu; Papua New Guinea	10.66	Wagui Anau; Australia	10.84	Justin Smith; Australia	10.92
200 metres (wind: +0.4 m/s)	Peter Pulu; Papua New Guinea	21.39 CR	Jeremy Dixon; New Zealand	21.57	Craig Bearda; New Zealand	21.61
200 metres (Invitation/Exhibition) (wind: +2.9 m/s)	Dallas Roberts; New Zealand	22.06w	Hayden Fisher; New Zealand	22.84w	Jarrod Adams; New Zealand	22.91w
400 metres	Jeffrey Bai; Papua New Guinea	49.03	Hayden Fisher; New Zealand	49.37	Moses Kamut; Vanuatu	49.88
400 metres (Invitation/Exhibition)	Jarrod Adams; New Zealand	50.56	A. Crawford; New Zealand	52.87		
800 metres	Gareth Hyett; New Zealand	1:51.12	Isireli Naikelekelevesi; Fiji	1:54.11	Loresh Kumaran; Fiji	1:57.82
1500 metres	Gareth Hyett; New Zealand	3:53.64	Paul Hamblyn; New Zealand	3:53.68	/Kader Touati; French Polynesia	4:03.09
1500 metres (Invitation/Exhibition)	Mark Rodgers; Canada	3:59.84	Clyde McIntosh; Canada	4:00.52	Mark Bailey; Canada	4:04.61
5000 metres	Ben Ruthe; New Zealand	15:05.27	Terenzo Bozzone; New Zealand	15:05.80	Neil Weare; Guam	15:30.47
Half Marathon	/Georges Richmond; French Polynesia	1:10:40 CR	Henry Foufaka; Solomon Islands	1:13:41	Patrick Zambelli; New Caledonia	1:14:43
3000 metres steeplechase	Neville Smith; New Zealand	9:47.07	Chris Votu; Solomon Islands	10:09.86	Henry Foufaka; Solomon Islands	10:31.35
110 metres hurdles (wind: -3.6 m/s)	Avele Tanielu; Samoa	15.18	Mowen Boino; Papua New Guinea	15.52	Maluai Penaia; Samoa	15.55
400 metres hurdles	Mowen Boino; Papua New Guinea	53.06	Matthew Stratton; New Zealand	54.12	Gregory Hubbard; Australia	54.44
High jump	Grant Knaggs; New Zealand	1.99	Sandy Katusele; Papua New Guinea	1.96	Antonio Rahiman Mohammed; Fiji	1.96
Pole vault	Jacobus Nel; New Zealand	4.56 CR	Laurent Honoré; New Caledonia /Tamatoa Laibe; French Polynesia	4.30		
Long jump	Fagamanu Sofai; Samoa	6.83w (wind: +3.1 m/s)	Matthew Sullivan; New Zealand	6.82 (wind: +1.9 m/s)	Harmon Harmon; Cook Islands	6.76w (wind: +8.5 m/s)
Triple jump	Tim Hawkes; New Zealand	14.66w (wind: +4.2 m/s)	Fagamanu Sofai; Samoa	14.64w (wind: +4.6 m/s)	Sandy Katusele; Papua New Guinea	13.95w (wind: +2.8 m/s)
Shot put	Chris Mene; Samoa	14.22	Sikipio Fihaki; Fiji	14.03	Salesi Ahokovi; Tonga	13.96
Discus throw	Chris Mene; Samoa	50.52 CR	Jean-Pierre Totélé; New Caledonia	49.03	/Gilles Valdenaire; French Polynesia	48.24
Hammer throw	Tane Edwards; New Zealand	50.54	Jean-Pierre Totélé; New Caledonia	49.37	Motekiai Ta'ufa; Tonga	37.32
Javelin throw	Scott McFarlane; New Zealand	57.59	Nathan Baart; Australia	49.66	Batchelor Tukumoeta; American Samoa	45.48
5000 metres Track Walk	Dip Chand; Fiji	28:27.76				
4 x 100 metres relay (Invitation/Exhibition)	New Zealand "A"; Todd Mansfield; Jeremy Dixon; Craig Bearda; Adam Somerville	42.14	Australia "A"; Peter Jackson; Justin Smith; Wagui Anau; Otis Gowa	42.23	Solomon Islands "A"	43.26
800 metres Medley relay	Papua New Guinea; Henry Ben; Peter Pulu; Jeffrey Bai; Mowen Boino	1:31.17	New Zealand; Adam Somerville; Jeremy Dixon; Craig Bearda; Hayden Fisher	1:31.89	Fiji; Meki Meli; Henry Rogo; Moape Vu; Isireli Naikelekelevesi	1:34.38
4 x 400 metres relay (Invitation/Exhibition)	Australia "A"; Gregory Hubbard; Nathan Baart; Anthony McCourt; Joshua Brogan	3:27.34	Canterbury "A"	3:27.56	New Zealand "A"; Matt Stratton; Craig Bearda; Ben Ruthe; Gareth Hyett	3:28.04

=== Women ===
Event	Gold		Silver		Bronze	
100 metres (wind: -2.6 m/s)	Makelesi Bulikiobo; Fiji	12.22	Latai Sikuvea; Tonga	12.49	Kate Schofield; New Zealand	12.49
200 metres (wind: +1.5 m/s)	Makelesi Bulikiobo; Fiji	24.21	Kate Schofield; New Zealand	24.93	Latai Sikuvea; Tonga	25.03
200 metres (Invitation/Exhibition) (wind: +2.1 m/s)	Phillippa Duncan; Canada	26.84w	Clare Hutchinson; Canada	27.53w	Amy McKay; Canada	27.54w
400 metres	Makelesi Bulikiobo; Fiji	56.67	Rachel Signal; New Zealand	57.21	Sarah Johnston; New Zealand	57.57
400 metres (Invitation/Exhibition)	Alice Webster; Canada	63.12	Julia Averill; Canada	63.49	Hannah Falvey; Canada	63.69
800 metres	Liz Auld; New Zealand	2:11.79	Hillary Bloomfield; Australia	2:23.11	Miriam Goiye; Papua New Guinea	2:26.00
1500 metres	Liz Auld; New Zealand	4:38.37	Melissa Thomas; New Zealand	4:41.49	Hillary Bloomfield; Australia	5:00.46
5000 metres	Brooke Eddy; New Zealand	16:58.72	Sophie Joynes; Australia	18:35.05	Banrenga Baikia; Kiribati	23:10.46
Half Marathon	Kylie Colum; Australia	1:18:57 CR	Ericka Ellis; New Caledonia	1:27:17	Sophie Joynes; Australia	1:27:54
2000 metres steeplechase	Brooke Eddy; New Zealand	6:56.52	Riana Dinsmore; Australia	7:19.16	Rachel Pedersen; Australia	8:00.16
100 metres hurdles (wind: -3.4 m/s)	Rachel Rogers; Fiji	15.39	Marie Yongomene; New Caledonia	15.74	Melesia Mafile'o; Tonga	16.11
400 metres hurdles	Mae Koime; Papua New Guinea	69.15	Vikatolia Manumu'a; Tonga	70.37		
High jump	Elizabeth Murphy; Australia; Tiffany Pickford; New Zealand	1.69			Sarah Johnston; New Zealand	1.63
Pole vault	Sophie Chiet; New Zealand	3.61	Marion Becker; New Caledonia	2.80		
Long jump	Elizabeth Murphy; Australia	5.78w (wind: +3.1 m/s)	Tatum Rickard; New Zealand	5.64w (wind: +9.9 m/s)	Melesia Mafile'o; Tonga	5.62w (wind: +5.7 m/s)
Triple jump	Melesia Mafile'o; Tonga	12.16w (wind: +3.4 m/s)	Marie Yongomene; New Caledonia	12.13w (wind: +3.2 m/s)	Tatum Rickard; New Zealand	12.04w (wind: +2.3 m/s)
Shot put	Ana Po'uhila; Tonga	15.66	Melehifo Uhi; Tonga	13.78	Joanne Morris; Australia	13.05
Discus throw	Melehifo Uhi; Tonga	51.01 CR	Ana Po'uhila; Tonga	45.11	Tereapii Tapoki; Cook Islands	40.87
Hammer throw	Sharyn Tennent; Australia	54.63	Debbie McCaw; New Zealand	47.87	Amélia Tui; New Caledonia	46.85
Javelin throw	Linda Selui; New Caledonia	47.90	Kate Smith; Australia	45.72	Jennifer Greatbatch; New Zealand	40.90
4 x 100 metres relay (Invitation/Exhibition)	New Zealand "A"; Anne Marie Spragg; Aimee Lynch; Amber Grogan; Sophie Chiet	48.12	Australia "A"; Kimara Timms; Elianna Suluvale; Rachel Phillips; Kate Smith	49.89	Canterbury "A"	50.01
800 metres Medley relay	Fiji; Rachael Rogers; Litiana Miller; Makelesi Bulikiobo; Mereoni Raluve	1:45.09	New Zealand; Anne Marie Spragg; Sarah Johnston; Kate Schofield; Rachel Signal	1:47.94	Australia; Kate Smith; Kimara Timms; Rachel Phillips; Nicole Burry	1:58.92
4 x 400 metres relay (Invitation/Exhibition)	Australia "A"; Rachel Pederson; Kimara Timms; Rachel Phillips; Nicole Burry	4:01.71	New Zealand "A"; Rachel Signal; Clare Goodwin; Liz Auld; Sarah Johnston	4:03.04	Canterbury "A"	4:15.41

=== Mixed ===
Event	Gold		Silver		Bronze	
3000 metres Track Walk	Kelly Shadbolt; Canada	16:26.29	Keith Rutherford; Canada	16:32.14	Patrick Enright; Canada	17:51.82

== Medal table (unofficial) ==
* Host nation (New Zealand)

Rank	Nation	Gold	Silver	Bronze	Total
1	New Zealand (NZL)*	15	13	6	34
2	Fiji (FIJ)	6	2	3	11
3	Papua New Guinea (PNG)	6	2	2	10
4	Australia (AUS)	4	6	7	17
5	Samoa (SAM)	4	1	1	6
6	Tonga (TON)	3	4	5	12
7	New Caledonia (NCL)	1	7	2	10
8	French Polynesia (TAH)	1	1	2	4
9	Solomon Islands (SOL)	0	2	1	3
10	Cook Islands (COK)	0	0	2	2
11	American Samoa (ASA)	0	0	1	1
11	Guam (GUM)	0	0	1	1
11	Kiribati (KIR)	0	0	1	1
11	Vanuatu (VAN)	0	0	1	1
Totals (14 entries)		40	38	35	113

== Participation (unofficial) ==
The participation of athletes from 16 countries could be determined from the Cool Running New Zealand newsgroup. Athletes from Canada and further athletes from New Zealand started as guests out of competition.

- American Samoa
- Australia
- Cook Islands
- Fiji
- Guam
- Kiribati
- Federated States of Micronesia
- Nauru
- /New Caledonia
- New Zealand
- Papua New Guinea
- Samoa
- Solomon Islands
- (French Polynesia) /Tahiti
- Tonga
- Vanuatu
