= Athletics at the 2001 South Pacific Mini Games =

Athletics at the VI South Pacific Mini Games
- Dates: December 10–14
- Host city: Middlegate, Norfolk Island
- Level: Senior
- Events: 43 (22 men, 21 women)
- Participation: 16 nations

Athletics competitions at the 2001 South Pacific Mini Games were held in Middlegate, Norfolk Island, between December 10–14, 2001.

A total of 43 events were contested, 22 by men and 21 by women.

== Medal summary ==
Medal winners and their results were published on the Athletics Weekly webpage courtesy of Tony Isaacs and Børre Lilloe, and on the Oceania Athletics Association webpage by Bob Snow.

Complete results can also be found on the Athletics PNG webpage.

=== Men ===
Event	Gold		Silver		Bronze	
100 metres (wind: +1.8 m/s)	Peter Pulu (PNG)	10.67	Reuben Apuri (SOL)	10.90	Mohd Roache (SAM)	10.91
200 metres (wind: -3.5 m/s)	Peter Pulu (PNG)	22.22	Joseph Kembu (PNG)	22.40	Henry Ben (PNG)	22.51
400 metres	Isireli Naikelekelevesi (FIJ)	49.25	Levi Kuamin (PNG)	49.60	Mowen Boino (PNG)	49.67
800 metres	Isireli Naikelekelevesi (FIJ)	1:55.62	Loresh Kumaran (FIJ)	1:56.89	Setefano Mika (SAM)	1:57.62
1500 metres	Isireli Naikelekelevesi (FIJ)	4:10.29	Setefano Mika (SAM)	4:10.30	Loresh Kumaran (FIJ)	4:10.94
5000 metres	(French Polynesia) /Georges Richmond (TAH)	15:51.41	Sapolai Yao (PNG)	15:54.71	Jimmy Sandy Okau-Sam-Molu (VAN)	15:59.38
10000 metres	(French Polynesia) /Georges Richmond (TAH)	33:17.66	Jimmy Sandy Okau-Sam-Molu (VAN)	33:19.04	Bimlesh Kumar (FIJ)	33:19.14
Half Marathon	(French Polynesia) /Georges Richmond (TAH)	1:14:03	David Kanie (PNG)	1:15:09	Chris Votu (SOL)	1:15:16
3000 metres steeplechase	Chanel Humuni (NCL)	9:59.02	Henry Foufaka (SOL)	10:00.28	Esala Talebula (FIJ)	10:06.29
110 metres hurdles (wind: -3.0 m/s)	Avele Tanielu (SAM)	15.21	Mowen Boino (PNG)	15.65	Fagamanu Sofai (SAM)	16.44
400 metres hurdles	Mowen Boino (PNG)	53.66	(French Polynesia) /Turo Bourgery (TAH)	54.67	Meli Cama (FIJ)	55.15
High jump	Stéphane Gouberaite (NCL)	2.00	Sandy Katusele (PNG)	1.90	Benetti Schwalger (SAM)	1.90
Long jump	Frédéric Erin (NCL)	7.16 (wind: -1.9 m/s)	Sandy Katusele (PNG)	6.51 (wind: -2.2 m/s)	(French Polynesia) /Apolosi Foliaki (TAH)	6.45 (wind: -1.5 m/s)
Triple jump	Frédéric Erin (NCL)	15.24 (wind: -2.9 m/s)	(French Polynesia) /Apolosi Foliaki (TAH)	14.20 (wind: -2.9 m/s)	Sandy Katusele (PNG)	14.06 (wind: -1.2 m/s)
Shot put	Bertrand Vili (NCL)	16.81	Daniel Kilama (NCL)	15.44	Mamao Fonorito (FIJ)	14.99
Discus throw	Bertrand Vili (NCL)	49.41	(French Polynesia) /Gilles Valdenaire (TAH)	43.86	Motekiai Ta'ufa (TGA)	43.43
Hammer throw	Brentt Jones (NFK)	53.91	Alikisio Fakaté (NCL)	48.46	Jérôme Tuugahala (NCL)	44.26
Javelin throw	James Goulding (FIJ)	71.90	Bertrand Vili (NCL)	63.78	Iosefo Vuloaloa (FIJ)	59.00
Octathlon	Iosefo Vuloaloa (FIJ)	5218	(French Polynesia) /Hendrey Ah Tchoy (TAH)	4771	Gabriele Qoro (FIJ)	4420
Kilometres Road Walk	Dip Chand (FIJ)	2:08:05				
4 x 100 metres relay	Papua New Guinea; Levi Kuamin; Peter Pulu; Henry Ben; Wally Kirika	42.04	Samoa; Avele Tanielu; Brendan McDermott; Patolo Tupuola; Mohd Roache	42.18	Solomon Islands; Andrew Konai; Reuben Apuri; Francis Manioru; Nelson Kabitana	42.41
4 x 400 metres relay	Fiji; Isireli Naikelekelevesi; Kaliova Tabaka; Meli Cama; Remesio Namara	3:17.99	Papua New Guinea; Levi Kuamin; Peter Pulu; Hubert Mission; Mowen Boino	3:18.98	Vanuatu; Moses Kamut; Alone Molisingi; Peter-Paul Enkae; David Thomas	3:22.37

=== Women ===
Event	Gold		Silver		Bronze	
100 metres (wind: +0.3 m/s)	Makelesi Bulikiobo (FIJ)	12.26	Mae Koime (PNG)	12.61	Della Marava (PNG)	12.62
200 metres (wind: -2.2 m/s)	Makelesi Bulikiobo (FIJ)	25.29	Vasiti Vatureba (FIJ)	26.00	Mereoni Raluve (FIJ)	26.18
400 metres	Makelesi Bulikiobo (FIJ)	58.17	Vasiti Vatureba (FIJ)	58.65	Mereoni Raluve (FIJ)	59.44
800 metres	Sisilia Dauniwe (FIJ)	2:25.68	Makelesi Ovatani (FIJ)	2:26.51	Miriam Goiye (PNG)	2:28.21
1500 metres	Makelesi Ovatani (FIJ)	5:04.26	(French Polynesia) /Vaite Bounhoure (TAH)	5:05.34	Miriam Goiye (PNG)	5:09.27
5000 metres	(French Polynesia) /Vaite Bounhoure (TAH)	19:09.95	Salome Tabuatalei (FIJ)	20:02.41	Sevena Francis (COK)	20:57.39
10000 metres	(French Polynesia) /Vaite Bounhoure (TAH)	40:00.08	Salome Tabuatalei (FIJ)	41:26.70		
Half Marathon	Salome Tabuatalei (FIJ)	1:36:39	Ericka Ellis (NCL)	1:36:58		
100 metres hurdles (wind: -2.8 m/s)	(French Polynesia) /Véronique Boyer (TAH)	15.14	Rose-Marie Vakie (NCL)	15.74	Vikatolia Manumu'a (TGA)	18.25
400 metres hurdles	Vikatolia Manumu'a (TGA)	74.31	Ledua Baker (FIJ)	79.18		
High jump	(French Polynesia) /Véronique Boyer (TAH)	1.80	Angela Way (PNG)	1.58	Melesia Mafile'o (TGA)	1.58
Long jump	(French Polynesia) /Véronique Boyer (TAH)	5.55 (wind: -1.5 m/s)	Jessica Taoupoulou (NCL)	5.18 (wind: -3.2 m/s)	Angela Way (PNG)	5.15 (wind: -2.8 m/s)
Triple jump	(French Polynesia) /Véronique Boyer (TAH)	12.50 (wind: -1.7 m/s)	Melesia Mafile'o (TGA)	11.64 (wind: -2.2 m/s)	Angela Way (PNG)	11.45 (wind: -1.1 m/s)
Shot put	Ana Po'uhila (TGA)	15.13	Melehifo Uhi (TGA)	13.46	Bina Ramesh (NCL)	12.84
Discus throw	Melehifo Uhi (TGA)	48.22	Marie-Christine Fakaté (NCL)	43.45	Ana Po'uhila (TGA)	42.28
Hammer throw	Amélia Tui (NCL)	48.06	Patricia Kolivai (NCL)	42.86	Siniva Marsters (COK)	42.56
Javelin throw	Bina Ramesh (NCL)	53.42	Rosemai Poilagi (NCL)	42.33	Rose-Marie Vakie (NCL)	41.30
Heptathlon	(French Polynesia) /Temoemoe Faremiro (TAH)	3899	(French Polynesia) /Dolores Dogba (TAH)	3547		
20 Kilometres Road Walk	Angela Keogh (NFK)	2:12:22				
4 x 100 metres relay	Fiji; Mereoni Raluve; Makelesi Bulikiobo; Sisilia Dauniwe; Vasiti Vatureba	47.84	Papua New Guinea; Nessie Ogisi; Mae Koime; Lynette Bureng; Della Marava	49.74	New Caledonia; Marion Becker; Karlenn Leca; Jessica Taoupoulou; Marie-Claude Haluatr	50.14
4 x 400 metres relay	Fiji; Sisilia Dauniwe; Mereoni Raluve; Vasiti Vatureba; Makelesi Bulikiobo	3:49.24	Papua New Guinea; Lorraine Bailey; Maria Kaupa; Miriam Goiye; Mae Koime	4:07.15	(French Polynesia) /Tahiti; Temoemoe Faremiro; Dolores Dogba; Vaite Bounhoure; Véronique Boyer	4:11.19

== Medal table (unofficial) ==
* Host nation (Norfolk Island)

Rank	Nation	Gold	Silver	Bronze	Total
1	Fiji (FIJ)	15	7	9	31
2	French Polynesia (TAH)	10	6	2	18
3	New Caledonia (NCL)	8	9	4	21
4	Papua New Guinea (PNG)	4	12	8	24
5	Tonga (TON)	3	2	4	9
6	Norfolk Island (NFK)*	2	0	0	2
7	Samoa (SAM)	1	2	4	7
8	Solomon Islands (SOL)	0	2	2	4
9	Vanuatu (VAN)	0	1	2	3
10	Cook Islands (COK)	0	0	2	2
Totals (10 entries)		43	41	37	121

== Participation (unofficial) ==
Athletes from the following 16 countries were reported to participate:

- Cook Islands
- Fiji
- Guam
- Kiribati
- Federated States of Micronesia
- Nauru
- New Caledonia
- Niue
- Norfolk Island
- Palau
- Papua New Guinea
- Samoa
- Solomon Islands
- (French Polynesia) /Tahiti
- Tonga
- Vanuatu
