= Athletics at the 2003 South Pacific Games =

Athletics at the XII South Pacific Games
- Dates: July 7–12, 2003
- Host city: Suva, Fiji
- Venue: National Stadium
- Level: Senior
- Events: 44 (23 men, 21 women)
- Participation: 19 nations

Athletics competitions at the 2003 South Pacific Games were held at the National Stadium in Suva, Fiji, between July 7 and 12, 2003.

A total of 44 events were contested, 23 by men and 21 by women.

There were some issues with the eligibility of athletes. Lisa Misipeka and Kelsey Nakanelua, both from American Samoa, were excluded, because due to the games charter, the athletes must have lived in their country or territory for at least five years. Expatriates must have lived in that country or territory for a period of four years immediately prior to the closing date for individual entries. Kristy Slade from Samoa was also found to be ineligible after winning the women's heptathlon.

== Medal summary ==
Medal winners and their results were published on the Athletics Weekly webpage courtesy of Tony Isaacs and Børre Lilloe, and on the Oceania Athletics Association webpage by Bob Snow.

Complete results can also be found on the Oceania Athletics Association webpage by Bob Snow. The fully automatic timing malfunctioned during the Men's 100 metres, and was totally out of action later in the programme.

=== Men ===
| Event | Gold | | Silver | | Bronze | |
|---|---|---|---|---|---|---|
| 100 metres | John Lum Kon (FIJ) | 10.8 (ht) | Jone Delai (FIJ) | 10.9 (ht) | Peter Pulu (PNG) | 10.9 (ht) |
| 200 metres (wind: -1.1 m/s) | John Lum Kon (FIJ) | 21.28 GR | Jeffrey Bai (PNG) | 21.74 | John Howard (FSM) | 21.94 |
| 400 metres | Jeffrey Bai (PNG) | 47.20 | Moses Kamut (VAN) | 48.39 | Isireli Naikelekelevesi (FIJ) | 48.43 |
| 800 metres | Isireli Naikelekelevesi (FIJ) | 1:51.06 | Clement Abai (PNG) | 1:51.68 | Loresh Kumaran (FIJ) | 1:56.31 |
| 1500 metres | Isireli Naikelekelevesi (FIJ) | 4:01.15 | Neil Weare (GUM) | 4:02.72 | Setefano Mika (SAM) | 4:09.07 |
| 5000 metres | Neil Weare (GUM) | 14:48.40 | Georges Richmond (PYF) | 14:54.19 | Morgan Clark (FIJ) | 15:19.72 |
| 10000 metres | Georges Richmond (PYF) | 31:54.7 (ht) | Morgan Clark (FIJ) | 32:40.9 (ht) | Jimmy Sandy Okau-Sam-Molu (VAN) | 33:04.1 (ht) |
| Half Marathon | Georges Richmond (PYF) | 1:09:53 GR | Henry Foufaka (SOL) | 1:13:01 | Tutea Degage (PYF) | 1:13:21 |
| 3000 metres steeplechase^{†} | Esala Talebula (FIJ) | 11:11.8 (ht) | Chris Votu (SOL) | 11:15.6 (ht) | Henry Foufaka (SOL) | 11:26.2 (ht) |
| 110 metres hurdles (wind: -1.6 m/s) | Jovesa Naivalu (FIJ) | 14.36 | Avele Tanielu (SAM) | 14.97 | Mowen Boino (PNG) | 15.37 |
| 400 metres hurdles | Mowen Boino (PNG) | 51.93 | Jovesa Naivalu (FIJ) | 52.50 | Meli Cama (FIJ) | 54.00 |
| High jump | Sandy Katusele (PNG) | 2.06 | Rajendra Prasad (FIJ) | 2.03 | Antonio Rahiman Mohammed (FIJ) | 2.03 |
| Pole vault | Jean-Bernard Harper (NCL) | 4.50 | Tamatoa Laibe (PYF) | 4.40 | Joseph Rodan II (FIJ) | 4.40 |
| Long jump | Eroni Tuivanuavou (FIJ) | 7.82 (wind: +1.4 m/s) GR | Frédéric Erin (NCL) | 7.65 (wind: +1.8 m/s) | Sandy Katusele (PNG) | 7.02 (wind: +1.2 m/s) |
| Triple jump | Frédéric Erin (NCL) | 15.14 w (wind: +2.6 m/s) | William Young (FIJ) | 14.99 (wind: +1.4 m/s) | Sandy Katusele (PNG) | 14.98 w (wind: +3.2 m/s) |
| Shot put | Daniel Kilama (NCL) | 16.57 | Shaka Sola (SAM) | 15.97 | Sosefo Fonorito (FIJ) | 15.29 |
| Discus throw | Shaka Sola (SAM) | 50.46 | Jean-Pierre Totélé (NCL) | 50.23 | Frédéric Kitea (NCL) | 48.22 |
| Hammer throw | Jean-Pierre Totélé (NCL) | 54.12 | Alikisio Fakaté (NCL) | 52.99 | Justin Andre (GUM) | 51.52 |
| Javelin throw | Gaëtan Siakinuu-Schmidt (NCL) | 70.99 | James Goulding (FIJ) | 68.05 | Tevita Ketedromo (FIJ) | 60.23 |
| Decathlon | Joseph Rodan II (FIJ) | 6161 | Iosefo Vuloaloa (FIJ) | 5983 | Hendrey Ah Tchoy (PYF) | 5460 |
| 20 Kilometres Road Walk | Dip Chand (FIJ) | 2:06:19.9t | Pradeep Chand (FIJ) | 2:07:07.2t | Manohar Maharaj (FIJ) | 2:16:40.9t |
| 4 x 100 metres relay | Papua New Guinea; Henry Ben; Jeffrey Bai; Wally Kirika; Peter Pulu | 40.94 | Fiji; Gabriel Matavola; John Lum Kon; Moape Vu; Jone Delai | 41.03 | Federated States of Micronesia; Peter Donis Rudolf; Danny Fredrick; Jack Howard; John Howard | 42.12 |
| 4 x 400 metres relay | Papua New Guinea; Clement Abai; Mowen Boino; Peter Pulu; Jeffrey Bai | 3:11.43 | Fiji; Gabriel Matavola; Waisea Finau; Jovesa Naivalu; Isireli Naikelekelevesi | 3:11.82 | Solomon Islands; Linton Mani Oeta; Jonah Hone; Nelson Kabitana; Chris Meke Walasi | 3:21.55 |

^{†}: The 3000 metres steeplechase event was one lap too long (approximately 3400 metres) due to a mistake in the lap counting.

=== Women ===
| Event | Gold | | Silver | | Bronze | |
|---|---|---|---|---|---|---|
| 100 metres | Makelesi Bulikiobo (FIJ) | 11.9 (ht) | Rachel Rogers (FIJ) | 12.3 (ht) | Litiana Miller (FIJ) | 12.5 (ht) |
| 200 metres (wind: -2.1 m/s) | Makelesi Bulikiobo (FIJ) | 23.68 GR | Mereoni Raluve (FIJ) | 24.71 | Litiana Miller (FIJ) | 25.03 |
| 400 metres | Makelesi Bulikiobo (FIJ) | 52.66 GR | Mereoni Raluve (FIJ) | 55.35 | Miriama Radiniwaimaro (FIJ) | 57.01 |
| 800 metres | Vasiti Vatureba (FIJ) | 2:18.46 | Stéphanie Nonotte (PYF) | 2:19.00 | Miriam Goiye (PNG) | 2:25.93 |
| 1500 metres | Stéphanie Nonotte (PYF) | 4:36.13 | Mary Sloan Siegrist (GUM) | 4:49.11 | Vaite Bounhoure (PYF) | 4:54.16 |
| 5000 metres | Sophie Gardon (PYF) | 18:22.9 (ht) GR | Vaite Bounhoure (PYF) | 18:49.0 (ht) | Mary Sloan Siegrist (GUM) | 19:00.6 (ht) |
| Half Marathon | Sophie Gardon (PYF) | 1:26:51 GR | Ericka Ellis (NCL) | 1:30:35 | Salome Tabuatalei (FIJ) | 1:36:46 |
| 100 metres hurdles (wind: -0.9 m/s) | Rachel Rogers (FIJ) | 13.97 | Marie Yongomene (NCL) | 14.94 | Rose-Marie Vakie (NCL) | 14.95 |
| 400 metres hurdles | Rachel Rogers (FIJ) | 61.50 | Laurence Upigit (NCL) | 62.02 | Mae Koime (PNG) | 64.16 |
| High jump | Véronique Boyer (PYF) | 1.70 | Melesia Mafile'o (TGA) | 1.60 | Adi Vika (FIJ) | 1.55 |
| Pole vault | Marion Becker (NCL) | 2.90 GR | Iowana Vakaloloma (FIJ) | 2.90 GR | Rosemai Poilagi (NCL) | 2.60 |
| Long jump | Laurence Upigit (NCL) | 5.94 w (wind: +3.2 m/s) | Soko Salaqiqi (FIJ) | 5.92 w (wind: +2.3 m/s) | Varanisese Viva (FIJ) | 5.59 w (wind: +2.1 m/s) |
| Triple jump | Véronique Boyer (PYF) | 13.10 w (wind: +3.7 m/s) | Melesia Mafile'o (TGA) | 12.39 (wind: +1.7 m/s) | Marie Yongomene (NCL) | 12.35 w (wind: +4.6 m/s) |
| Shot put | Ana Po'uhila (TGA) | 15.89 GR | (Wallis and Futuna) /Selema Sione (WLF) | 14.99 | Tereapii Tapoki (COK) | 13.91 |
| Discus throw | Melehifo Uhi (TGA) | 50.78 GR | Ana Po'uhila (TGA) | 48.14 | Tereapii Tapoki (COK) | 46.46 |
| Hammer throw^{*} | Patricia Kolivai (NCL) | 44.95 | Marie-Chanel Tafusimai (NCL) | 42.38 | Amelia Tui (NCL) | 40.03 |
| Javelin throw | Bina Ramesh (NCL) | 54.36 GR | (Wallis and Futuna) /Selema Sione (WLF) | 51.77 | Sisilia Lau (FIJ) | 49.28 |
| Heptathlon^{**} | Rose-Marie Vakie (NCL) | 4185 | Temoemoe Faremiro (PYF) | 4149 | Seraseini Likuwaqa (FIJ) | 4081 |
| 20 Kilometres Road Walk | Deepika Chand (FIJ) | 2:47:32.3t | Eleni Divute (FIJ) | 2:48:06.8t | | |
| 4 x 100 metres relay | Fiji; Litiana Miller; Makelesi Bulikiobo; Mereoni Raluve; Rachel Rogers | 44.86 GR | Papua New Guinea; Nessie Ogisi; Mae Koime; Helen Philemon; Monica Jonathan | 48.95 | French Polynesia; Temoemoe Faremiro; Marie-Jeanne Ceran-Jerusalemy; Dolores Dogba; Cécile Tiatia | 50.93 |
| 4 x 400 metres relay^{***} | New Caledonia; Marie-Claude Haluatr; Marie Yongomene; Françoise Hnepeune; Laurence Upigit | 3:59.88 | Papua New Guinea; Lorraine Bailey; Angela Way; Helen Philemon; Mae Koime | 4:04.83 | French Polynesia; Marie-Jeanne Ceran-Jerusalemy; Cécile Tiatia; Stephanie Nonotte; Véronique Boyer | 4:07.95 |

^{*}: Initially, Siniva Marsters from the Cook Islands was listed as winner of the hammer throw with 45.83 m. However, she subsequently failed a drug test and had the performance deleted.
^{**}: Initially, Kristy Slade from Samoa won the women's heptathlon with 4.494 pts, but she was challenged and found to be ineligible to participate.
^{***}: Initially, the Fiji team (Vasiti Vatureba, Makelesi Bulikiobo, Miriama Radiniwaimaro, Mereoni Raluve) won the women's 4x400 metres relay running a new games record in 3:40.03. However, they had to be disqualified for substituting a runner after the final submission of the team composition and running order.

== Medal table (unofficial) ==
The medal table was published.

* Host nation (Fiji)

| Rank | Nation | Gold | Silver | Bronze | Total |
|---|---|---|---|---|---|
| 1 | Fiji (FIJ)* | 17 | 16 | 17 | 50 |
| 2 | New Caledonia (NCL) | 11 | 7 | 6 | 24 |
| 3 | French Polynesia (PYF) | 7 | 5 | 5 | 17 |
| 4 | Papua New Guinea (PNG) | 5 | 4 | 6 | 15 |
| 5 | Tonga (TON) | 2 | 3 | 0 | 5 |
| 6 | Guam (GUM) | 1 | 2 | 2 | 5 |
| 7 | Samoa (SAM) | 1 | 2 | 1 | 4 |
| 8 | Solomon Islands (SOL) | 0 | 2 | 2 | 4 |
| 9 | Wallis and Futuna (WLF) | 0 | 2 | 0 | 2 |
| 10 | Vanuatu (VAN) | 0 | 1 | 1 | 2 |
| 11 | Cook Islands (COK) | 0 | 0 | 2 | 2 |
| 11 | Federated States of Micronesia (FSM) | 0 | 0 | 2 | 2 |
| Totals (12 entries) | | 44 | 44 | 44 | 132 |

== Participation (unofficial) ==
Athletes from the following 19 countries were reported to participate:

- American Samoa
- Cook Islands
- Fiji
- French Polynesia
- Guam
- Kiribati
- Marshall Islands
- Federated States of Micronesia
- New Caledonia
- Niue
- Northern Mariana Islands
- Palau
- Papua New Guinea
- Samoa
- Solomon Islands
- Tonga
- Tuvalu
- Vanuatu
- /Wallis and Futuna
