= Nneka Okpala =

New Zealand athlete (born 1988)

Nneka Okpala (born 27 April 1988) is a New Zealand athlete. She competes mainly in the triple jump. She has won the New Zealand women's triple jump competition five times and the Australian women's triple jump title once.

Okpala's parents emigrated from Nigeria to New Zealand in 1987, and Okpala was born in Ōtāhuhu, Auckland the following year. She joined the Papatoetoe Athletics Club when she was 6 years old, and when she was 15 she started competing in the triple jump. Two years later she represented New Zealand at the 2005 IAAF World Youth Championships in Morocco. The same year, she also represented New Zealand at the Sydney Youth Games.

In 2015, she competed for New Zealand at the World University Games in Korea, finishing eighth in the triple jump, while studying at Monash University, Melbourne. Additionally in 2015, Okpala won the Essendon Athletics Club Athlete of the Year award and was named the Monash University Female Athlete of the Year.

Okpala graduated from Monash University with a master's degree in international health.
