= Bina Ramesh =

French javelin thrower

Personal information
- Born: 28 August 1979 (age 46) Nouméa, New Caledonia
- Height: 176 cm (5 ft 9 in)
- Weight: 62 kg (137 lb)

Sport
- Country: France / New Caledonia
- Sport: Athletics
- Event: Javelin throw / Shot put / Hammer throw
Medal record
Women's athletics
Representing France
World Junior Championships
Bronze medal – third place	1996 Sydney	Javelin
European Junior Championships
Bronze medal – third place	1997 Ljubljana	Javelin
Representing New Caledonia
Pacific Games
Silver medal – second place	2015 Port Moresby	Javelin
Bronze medal – third place	2011 Nouméa	Javelin
Bronze medal – third place	2011 Nouméa	Discus
Gold medal – first place	2007 Apia	Javelin
Gold medal – first place	2003 Suva	Javelin
Gold medal – first place	1995 Pirae	Javelin
Pacific Mini Games
Gold medal – first place	2009 Rarotonga	Javelin
Bronze medal – third place	2009 Rarotonga	Hammer throw
Gold medal – first place	2001 Middlegate	Javelin
Bronze medal – third place	2001 Middlegate	Shot put

Bina Ramesh (born 28 August 1979 in Noumea) is a New Caledonian athlete who specialises in the Javelin. She is of Wallisian heritage.

== Biography ==
She won bronze medals for France at the 1996 World Junior Championships and the 1997 Junior European Championships.

She won three French senior national Javelin championship titles in 1998, 2000 and 2004.

At the 2009 Pacific Mini Games in Rarotonga she won gold in the javelin. At the 2015 Pacific Games in Port Moresby she won silver.

=== Prize list ===
- French Championships in Athletics :
  - 3-time winner of the javelin in 1998, 2000 and 2004.

=== Records ===
personal records
Event	Performance	Place	Date
Javelin Throw (old model)	61.66 m		1997
