= Maggie George =

Native American academic administrator and educator from Arizona

President of Diné College
- In office August 2011 – January 2016
- Preceded by: Ferlin Clark
- Succeeded by: Martín Ahumada

Personal details
- Born: Red Valley, Arizona, U.S.
- Citizenship: Navajo Nation • U.S.
- Education: New Mexico Highlands University (B.A., M.A.); University of Kansas (Ph.D.)
- Occupation: Academic administrator, educator

Maggie L. George is a Native American academic administrator and educator. She served as president of Diné College from August 2011 to January 2016. In 2006, George became the inaugural director of academic affairs and Indian education for the New Mexico Higher Education Department.

== Early life ==
George was raised in Red Valley, Arizona. Her family is part of the Táchiiʼnii clan, born for the Naakaii Dine clan. George's mother, Jesse Agnes Lee (1935–2005), was a homemaker and her father, Henry Lee, Sr. is a traditional practitioner. She was raised in a traditional pastoral Navajo family raising livestock and surviving off the land. George attended public and boarding school on the Navajo Reservation. In regards to her upbringing, George stated that "I grew up in an era when it was a challenge to be an Indian, and only one of my teachers was Navajo...I decided in junior high that I wanted to change that and teach Navajo children. Knowing who I was as a Navajo person — and being grounded in my identity, language and culture — helped me have confidence, competence and persistence."

== Education and early career ==
George completed a B.A. in elementary education (1980) and a M.A. in guidance and counseling (1989) at the New Mexico Highlands University School of Education. George worked as a K-12 educator and counselor for the Bureau of Indian Affairs and contract schools in New Mexico. She completed a Ph.D. in higher education policy and leadership at University of Kansas. Her doctoral studies investigated bilingual and bicultural teacher preparation at Diné College. She researched the importance of having teachers of a similar social and ethnic background to their pupils Her results indicated that Navajo teachers who were bilingual and bicultural in regards to language, cultural traditions, and clan relationships yielded more results in the classroom. George's 2005 dissertation was titled The promise of indigenous education: a case study of Navajo bilingual-bicultural teachers. Lisa Wolf-Wendel was her doctoral advisor.

== Career ==
George served as executive director of the White House Initiative on Tribal Colleges and Universities. She was the deputy director of the American Indian Science and Engineering Society. She was a faculty member and dean of the school of education at Haskell Indian Nations University. She was an adjunct faculty member at the American Indian Languages Development institute at the University of Arizona. She served as director of the American Indian Program at New Mexico State University. She was dean and academic vice president of Diné College from 2000 to 2005. From 2003 to 2009, she was a consultant-evaluator for the Higher Learning Commission. In 2006, George became the first director of academic affairs and Indian education for the New Mexico Higher Education Department. She returned in to Diné College as the chair administrator of the Center for Diné Studies in March 2011. In August 2011, she was named president. George was placed on administrative leave by the college Board of Regents on October 9, 2015 due to "disagreements with her management style." In January 2016, George resigned as president of Diné College. She was succeeded by Martín Ahumada. She is the owner and operator of the education consulting firm, Indigenous Research Associates, and a leadership coach for Achieving the Dream.

== Awards and honors ==
George won a Fulbright–Hays Fellowship.

== See also ==
- List of women presidents or chancellors of co-ed colleges and universities
