= Otis Gowa =

Australian sprinter

Personal information
- Nationality: Australia
- Born: 3 September 1985 (age 41) Cape York Peninsula, Queensland

Sport
- Sport: Athletics
Medal record
Men's athletics
Representing Australia
Oceania Championships
Bronze medal – third place	2006 Apia	4x100 m relay
Bronze medal – third place	2004 Townsville	100 m
- Updated on 22 April 2013

Otis Gowa (born 3 September 1985) is an indigenous Australian sprinter raised in Queensland.

Gowa won the Australian national 100 m sprint title in a time of 10.63 seconds. His time was just outside his personal best time of 10.54 seconds, achieved in Singapore during 2007. He also competed in the 2008 Stawell Gift finishing fourth.

== Achievements ==
Year	Competition	Venue	Position	Event	Notes
Representing Australia
2002	Oceania Championships	Christchurch, New Zealand	2nd (exhibition)	4 × 100 m relay	42.23 s
2004	Oceania Championships	Townsville, Australia	3rd	100 m	10.91 s (wind: -0.1 m/s)
2004	Oceania Championships	Townsville, Australia	2nd (exhibition)	4 × 100 m relay	42.20 s
2006	Oceania Championships	Apia, Samoa	3rd	4 × 100 m relay	42.11 s
