= Octathlon =

Track and field competition with eight events

An octathlon is a combined event competition consisting of eight different sports or contests. A competitor in an octathlon is referred to as an octathlete.

== Track and field ==
An octathlon in athletics is an event which consists of eight track and field events. The word "octathlon" derives from the Greek words okto, the number 8, and athlos, meaning contest. The most common version of the combined event is contested by boys at youth level, most notably at the IAAF World Youth Championships in Athletics. The events within the youth octathlon are: the 100 metres, long jump, 110 metres hurdles, high jump, 400 metres, shot put, javelin throw, and 1000 metres (omitting the discus throw & pole vault of the 10 event decathlon).

Although this is primarily a youth or junior event, logistical problems have seen senior octathlons contested, for example at the 2007 South Pacific Games.

== Workouts ==
The octathlon can also refer to a set of gym exercises, including the stationary bike, lat pulldown, step ups, row machine, treadmill, and bench press. Because all of these events are done on gym equipment, it can be done in most health clubs. Some claim it to be the ideal pre-season sport for athletes due to its mix of strength and cardiovascular activities.
