= Ann Mooney =

Papua New Guinean athlete

Personal information
- Nationality: Papua New Guinean
- Born: 14 April 1975 (age 50)

Sport
- Sport: Sprinting
- Event: 400 metres

Ann Mooney (born 14 April 1975) is a Papua New Guinean sprinter. She competed in the women's 400 metres at the 2000 Summer Olympics.
