= Athletics at the Pacific Games =

Track event in Nouméa at the 2011 Pacific Games.

Athletics competitions have been held at every Pacific Games since the inaugural edition 1963 in Suva, Fiji and at every Pacific Mini Games since the inaugural edition 1981 in Honiara, Solomon Islands. Both events are open for the 22 member federations of the Pacific Games Council. The Pacific Games started as South Pacific Games and were renamed in 2011, whereas the Pacific Mini Games started as South Pacific Mini Games and were renamed in 2009.

== Editions ==
| Games | Year | Host city | Host country | Best nation |
|---|---|---|---|---|
| I | 1963 | Suva | Fiji | Fiji |
| II | 1966 | Nouméa | New Caledonia | Fiji |
| III | 1969 | Port Moresby | (Territory of Papua and New Guinea) Papua and New Guinea | New Caledonia |
| IV | 1971 | Pirae | French Polynesia | (French Polynesia) New Caledonia |
| V | 1975 | Tumon | Guam | New Caledonia |
| VI | 1979 | Suva | Fiji | New Caledonia |
| VII | 1983 | Apia | Western Samoa | New Caledonia |
| VIII | 1987 | Nouméa | New Caledonia | New Caledonia |
| IX | 1991 | Port Moresby | Papua New Guinea | Fiji |
| X | 1995 | Pirae | Tahiti | Fiji |
| XI | 1999 | Santa Rita | Guam | Fiji |
| XII | 2003 | Suva | Fiji | Fiji |
| XIII | 2007 | Apia | Samoa | Fiji |
| XIV | 2011 | Nouméa | New Caledonia | New Caledonia |
| XV | 2015 | Port Moresby | Papua New Guinea | Papua New Guinea |
| XVI | 2019 | Apia | Samoa | Papua New Guinea |
| XVII | 2023 | Honiara | Solomon Islands | Australia |
| XVIII | 2027 | Hitia'a O Te Ra | Tahiti | TBD |

== Medal table ==
Medal winners for the athletics events of the Pacific Games until 2003 were published. Complete results can be found on the Oceania Athletics Association webpage. After the 2023 Games, only Kiribati, Niue, Tokelau, and Tuvalu are yet to win a medal.

Updated after the 2023 Pacific Games.

All-time medal table (Athletics)
| Rank | Nation | Gold | Silver | Bronze | Total |
|---|---|---|---|---|---|
| 1 | New Caledonia | 209 | 159 | 151 | 519 |
| 2 | Fiji | 162 | 167 | 126 | 455 |
| 3 | Papua New Guinea | 124 | 147 | 146 | 417 |
| 4 | Tahiti | 86 | 79 | 94 | 259 |
| 5 | Tonga | 26 | 20 | 33 | 79 |
| 6 | Australia | 17 | 3 | 0 | 20 |
| 7 | Samoa | 13 | 21 | 24 | 58 |
| 8 | Vanuatu | 12 | 23 | 35 | 70 |
| 9 | Wallis and Futuna | 12 | 17 | 21 | 50 |
| 10 | Solomon Islands | 8 | 22 | 30 | 60 |
| 11 | Guam | 6 | 13 | 12 | 31 |
| 12 | Cook Islands | 5 | 5 | 5 | 15 |
| 13 | Nauru | 5 | 3 | 4 | 12 |
| 14 | New Zealand | 3 | 6 | 2 | 11 |
| 15 | American Samoa | 3 | 2 | 2 | 7 |
| 16 | Northern Mariana Islands | 2 | 0 | 0 | 2 |
| 17 | Norfolk Island | 1 | 2 | 3 | 6 |
| 18 | Gilbert and Ellice Islands | 0 | 1 | 0 | 1 |
| 18 | Marshall Islands | 0 | 1 | 0 | 1 |
| 18 | Palau | 0 | 1 | 0 | 1 |
| 21 | Federated States of Micronesia | 0 | 0 | 2 | 2 |
| Totals (21 entries) | | 694 | 692 | 690 | 2,076 |

== Pacific Mini Games ==
=== Editions ===
| Games | Year | Location | Host country | Events | | | |
| Games | Year | Location | Host country | Men | Women | Mixed | Total |
|---|---|---|---|---|---|---|---|
| I | 1981 | Honiara | Solomon Islands | 22 | 14 | —N/a | 36 |
| II | 1985 | Rarotonga | Cook Islands | 23 | 17 | —N/a | 40 |
| III | 1989 | Nukualofa | Tonga | 23 | 17 | —N/a | 40 |
| IV | 1993 | Port Vila | Vanuatu | 23 | 19 | —N/a | 42 |
| V | 1997 | Pago Pago | American Samoa | 23 | 19 | —N/a | 42 |
| VI | 2001 | Middlegate | Norfolk Island | 22 | 21 | —N/a | 43 |
| VII | 2005 | Koror | Palau | 20 | 19 | —N/a | 39 |
| VIII | 2009 | Rarotonga | Cook Islands | 21 | 20 | —N/a | 41 |
| IX | 2013 | Mata-Utu | Wallis and Futuna | 25 | 22 | —N/a | 47 ^{a} |
| X | 2017 | Port Vila | Vanuatu | 25 | 22 | —N/a | 47 ^{a} |
| XI | 2022 | Saipan | Northern Mariana Islands | 26 | 26 | —N/a | 52 ^{c} |
| XII | 2025 | Koror | Palau | 27 | 24 | 1 | 52 ^{c} |
| XIII | 2029 | Rarotonga | Cook Islands | | | | |

=== Medals ===
Medal winners for the athletics events of the Pacific Mini Games until 2005 were published. Complete results can be found on the Oceania Athletics Association webpage.

== See also ==
List of Pacific Games records in athletics

== Notes ==
^a Four parasport events were included (three for men and one for women).

^b Six parasport events were included (three for men and three for women).

^c Ten parasport events were included (five for men and five for women).
