= List of Micronesian Championships in Athletics records =

The Micronesian Championships in athletics records are the best marks set by athletes who are representing one of the member states of the Micronesian Championships Council during the correspondent athletics event which began in 2003.

== Men ==
| Event | Record | Athlete | Nationality | Date | Championships | Place | Ref. |
|---|---|---|---|---|---|---|---|
| 100 m | 10.55 (+1.6 m/s) | Rodman Teltull | Palau | 2 June 2016 | 2016 Championships | Kolonia, Federated States of Micronesia | |
| 200 m | 21.93 (+0.2 m/s) | Rodman Teltull | Palau | 4 June 2016 | 2016 Championships | Kolonia, Federated States of Micronesia | |
| 400 m | 50.88 | Jack Howard | Federated States of Micronesia | April 2003 | 2003 Championships | Koror, Palau | |
| 800 m | 2:03.22 | Matthew Pangelinan | Guam | August 2009 | 2009 Championships | Gold Coast, Australia | |
| 1500 m | 4:13.55 | Derek Mandell | Guam | 14 June 2018 | 2018 Championships | Saipan, Northern Mariana Islands | |
| 3000 m | 9:45.08 | Derek Mandell | Guam | 15 June 2018 | 2018 Championships | Saipan, Northern Mariana Islands | |
| 5000 m | 17:11.03 | Toby Castro | Guam | August 2009 | 2009 Championships | Gold Coast, Australia | |
| 10,000 m | 38:27.44 | Jay Antonia | Guam | December 2005 | 2005 Championships | Saipan, Northern Mariana Islands | |
| 110 m hurdles | 17.37 (−0.1 m/s) | Leon Mengloi | Palau | August 2009 | 2009 Championships | Gold Coast, Australia | |
| 400 m hurdles | 59.67 | Matt Wong | Guam | 4 June 2016 | 2016 Championships | Kolonia, Federated States of Micronesia | |
| 3000 m steeplechase | 11:53.77 | Kabriel Ketson | Northern Mariana Islands | August 2009 | 2009 Championships | Gold Coast, Australia | |
| High jump | 1.68 m | Ryon Gaines | Palau | 14 June 2018 | 2018 Championships | Saipan, Northern Mariana Islands | |
| Long jump | 6.62 m | Rabangaki Nawai | Kiribati | December 2007 | 2007 Championships | Yona, Guam | |
| Triple jump | 13.35 m (+0.3 m/s) | Buraieta Yeeting | Kiribati | December 2005 | 2005 Championships | Saipan, Northern Mariana Islands | |
| Shot put | 13.39 m | Justin Andre | Guam | December 2005 | 2005 Championships | Saipan, Northern Mariana Islands | |
| Discus throw | 41.15 m | Justin Andre | Guam | 2 June 2016 | 2016 Championships | Kolonia, Federated States of Micronesia | |
| Hammer throw | 51.17 m | Justin Andre | Guam | 3 June 2016 | 2016 Championships | Kolonia, Federated States of Micronesia | |
| Javelin throw | 56.94 m | Clayton Maluwelgiye | Federated States of Micronesia | April 2003 | 2003 Championships | Koror, Palau | |
| Octathlon | 4496 pts | Rabangaki Nawai | Kiribati | December 2005 | 2005 Championships | Saipan, Northern Mariana Islands | |
| Octathlon | 100m (wind) / Long jump (wind) / Shot put / 400m / 110m H (wind) / High jump / Javelin / 1000m | | | | | | |
| 4 × 100 m relay | 43.46 | Adrian Ililau; Ryon Gaines; Rodman Teltull; Gwynn Uehara | Palau | 14 June 2018 | 2018 Championships | Saipan, Northern Mariana Islands | |
| 4 × 400 m relay | 3:29.27 | | Federated States of Micronesia | April 2003 | 2003 Championships | Koror, Palau | |

== Women ==
| Event | Record | Athlete | Nationality | Date | Championships | Place | Ref. |
|---|---|---|---|---|---|---|---|
| 100 m | 12.90 (−0.6 m/s) | Ngerak Florencio | Palau | April 2003 | 2003 Championships | Koror, Palau | |
| 100 m | 12.90 | Rosa-Mystique Jone | Nauru | December 2007 | 2007 Championships | Yona, Guam | |
| 200 m | 26.33 (+1.0 m/s) | Ngerak Florencio | Palau | December 2005 | 2005 Championships | Saipan, Northern Mariana Islands | |
| 400 m | 1:02.91 | Yvonne Bennet | Northern Mariana Islands | August 2009 | 2009 Championships | Gold Coast, Australia | |
| 800 m | 2:24.50 | Genina Criss | Guam | 14 June 2018 | 2018 Championships | Saipan, Northern Mariana Islands | |
| 1500 m | 5:07.14 | Genina Criss | Guam | 15 June 2018 | 2018 Championships | Saipan, Northern Mariana Islands | |
| 5000 m | 19:44.28 | Noriko Jim | Northern Mariana Islands | December 2005 | 2005 Championships | Saipan, Northern Mariana Islands | |
| 10,000 m | 46:52.00 | Genina Criss | Guam | 2 June 2016 | 2016 Championships | Kolonia, Federated States of Micronesia | |
| 100 m hurdles | 17.71 (−3.0 m/s) | Richelle Tugade | Guam | 14 June 2018 | 2018 Championships | Saipan, Northern Mariana Islands | |
| 400 m hurdles | 1:10.29 | Richelle Tugade | Guam | 15 June 2018 | 2018 Championships | Saipan, Northern Mariana Islands | |
| High jump | 1.38 m | Maurine de la Paz | Guam | 14 June 2018 | 2018 Championships | Saipan, Northern Mariana Islands | |
| Long jump | 4.66 m (+2.0 m/s) | Jacqueline Wonenberg | Northern Mariana Islands | August 2009 | 2009 Championships | Gold Coast, Australia | |
| Long jump | 4.90 m (NWI) | Richelle Tugade | Guam | 15 June 2018 | 2018 Championships | Saipan, Northern Mariana Islands | |
| Shot put | 11.03 m | Genie Gerardo | Guam | 14 June 2018 | 2018 Championships | Saipan, Northern Mariana Islands | |
| Discus throw | 32.92 m | Jeremiah Chanana | Nauru | 15 June 2018 | 2018 Championships | Saipan, Northern Mariana Islands | |
| Hammer throw | 31.36 m | Genie Gerardo | Guam | 15 June 2018 | 2018 Championships | Saipan, Northern Mariana Islands | |
| Javelin throw | 38.57 m | Maleah Umerang Tangadik | Palau | December 2007 | 2007 Championships | Yona, Guam | |
| 4 × 100 m relay | 51.89 | | Palau | April 2003 | 2003 Championships | Koror, Palau | |
| 4 × 400 m relay | 4:25.06 | Maurine Delapaz; Kaitlynn Calma; Emma Sheedy; Maria Ollet | Guam | 3 June 2016 | 2016 Championships | Kolonia, Federated States of Micronesia | |

== Mixed ==
| Event | Record | Athlete | Nationality | Date | Championships | Place | Ref. |
|---|---|---|---|---|---|---|---|
| Mixed Sprint medley relay (1,1,2,4) | 1:42.28 | | Palau | April 2003 | 2003 Championships | Koror, Palau | |
