= Oceania Athletics Regional Championships =

International athletics competition

- Genre: Outdoor track and field
- Venue: varies
- Participants: Oceania Athletics member federations
- Organiser: Oceania Athletics Association

The Oceania Athletics Regional Championships – comprising the Melanesian, Polynesian, and Micronesian Championships – are sub-regional track and field competitions organized by the Oceania Athletics Association (OAA). Often held in non-area championship years since the early 2000's, these events provide critical, high-level competition for elite and developing athletes from the three sub-regions of Oceania to gain international experience.

The Regional Championships are divided into three distinct sub-regions—Melanesia, Micronesia, and Polynesia—often utilizing local infrastructure and culture to highlight the sport. The regions at the regional meetings decide the location for the Championships.

== Melanesian Championships ==
Participating associations

- Australia
- Fiji
- New Caledonia
- Norfolk Island
- Papua New Guinea
- Solomon Islands
- Vanuatu

Editions

	Year	City	Country	Date	Venue	No. of Events	No. of Athletes
1	2001	Suva	Fiji	April			
2	2003	Lae	Papua New Guinea	25–27 April			
3	2005	Lae	Papua New Guinea	22–24 April	Sir Ignatius Kilage Stadium		
4	2007	Cairns	Australia	14–19 August	Barlow Park		
5	2009	Gold Coast	Australia	4–8 August	Griffith University		
6	2016	Suva	Fiji	7–9 July	ANZ Stadium		
7	2018	Port Vila	Vanuatu	9–11 May	Korman Stadium		

== Micronesian Championships ==
Participating associations

- Federated States of Micronesia
- Guam
- Kiribati
- Marshall Islands
- Nauru
- Northern Mariana Islands
- Palau
- Wallis and Futuna

Editions

	Year	City	Country	Date	Venue	No. of Events	No. of Athletes
1	2003	Koror	Palau	25–26 April			
2	2005	Saipan	Northern Mariana Islands	14–15 December	Oleai Sports Complex		
3	2007	Yona	Guam	14–15 December	Leo Palace Resort		
4	2009	Gold Coast	Australia	4–8 August	Griffith University		
5	2016	Kolonia	Federated States of Micronesia	2–4 June			
6	2018	Saipan	Northern Mariana Islands	14–16 June	Oleai Sports Complex		

== Polynesian Championships ==
Participating associations

- American Samoa
- Cook Islands
- French Polynesia
- New Zealand
- Niue
- Tonga
- Tuvalu

Editions

	Year	City	Country	Date	Venue	No. of Events	No. of Athletes
1	2000	Apia	Samoa				
2	2005	Papeete	French Polynesia	October			
3	2007	Rarotonga	Cook Islands	October 16–17			
4	2009	Gold Coast	Australia	August 4–8	Griffith University		
5	2016	Papeete	French Polynesia	April 7–9	Pater Stadium		
6	2026	Auckland	New Zealand	March 5–8	The Trusts Arena		
