= List of Polynesian Championships in Athletics records =

The Polynesian Championships in athletics records are the best marks set by athletes who are representing one of the member states of the Polynesian Championships Council during the correspondent athletics event which began in 2000.

== Men ==
Key: Defunct event

Event	Record	Athlete	Nationality	Date	Championships	Place	Ref.
100 m	10.82 (−0.8 m/s)	Clayton Mbofana	New Zealand	August 2009	2009 Championships	Gold Coast, Australia	
200 m	21.68 NWI	Misili Manu	Samoa	2000	2000 Championships	Apia, Samoa	
400 m	49.60	Kelsey Nakanelua	American Samoa	2000	2000 Championships	Apia, Samoa	
800 m	1:55.79	Michael Whitehead	New Zealand	August 2009	2009 Championships	Gold Coast, Australia	
1500 m	4:07.61	Michael Whitehead	New Zealand	August 2009	2009 Championships	Gold Coast, Australia	
3000 m	8:14.3	Olivier Huc	French Polynesia	2000	2000 Championships	Apia, Samoa	
5000 m	16:10.03	Loic Mevel	Tahiti	April 2016	2016 Championships	(French Polynesia) Papeete, Tahiti	
10,000 m	34:06.17	Francky Maraetaata	French Polynesia	August 2009	2009 Championships	Gold Coast, Australia	
110 m hurdles	14.81	Toriki Urarii	Tahiti	2005	2005 Championships	(French Polynesia) Papeete, Tahiti	
400 m hurdles	54.92	Aleki Toetu'u Sapoi	Tonga	2000	2000 Championships	Apia, Samoa	
3000 m steeplechase	10:40.22	Pierre Bourret	French Polynesia	August 2009	2009 Championships	Gold Coast, Australia	
High jump	1.96 m	Regan Standing	New Zealand	August 2009	2009 Championships	Gold Coast, Australia	
Pole vault	4.30 m	Matheo Lada	French Polynesia	April 2016	2016 Championships	(French Polynesia) Papeete, Tahiti	
Long jump	6.94 m (nw)	Tokaikolo Latapu	Tonga	2000	2000 Championships	Apia, Samoa	
Triple jump	14.44 m (nw)	Fagamanu Sofai	Samoa	2000	2000 Championships	Apia, Samoa	
Shot put	17.39 m	Tumatai Dauphin	Tahiti	2005	2005 Championships	(French Polynesia) Papeete, Tahiti	
Discus throw	46.62 m	Tumatai Dauphin	Tahiti	2005	2005 Championships	(French Polynesia) Papeete, Tahiti	
Hammer throw	39.88 m	Gary Tuiletufuga	Samoa	2000	2000 Championships	Apia, Samoa	
Javelin throw	53.71 m	Vaihau Botari	French Polynesia	2005	2005 Championships	(French Polynesia) Papeete, Tahiti	
4 × 100 m relay	42.72		Samoa	2000	2000 Championships	Apia, Samoa	
4 × 400 m relay	3:26.6		Samoa	2000	2000 Championships	Apia, Samoa	

== Women ==
Key: Defunct event

Event	Record	Athlete	Nationality	Date	Championships	Place	Ref.
100 m	12.30 (+0.9 m/s)	Patricia Taea	Cook Islands	April 2016	2016 Championships	(French Polynesia) Papeete, Tahiti	
200 m	25.26 (+1.5 m/s)	Sarah Pearce	New Zealand	April 2016	2016 Championships	(French Polynesia) Papeete, Tahiti	
400 m	55.60	Sarah Pearce	New Zealand	April 2016	2016 Championships	(French Polynesia) Papeete, Tahiti	
800 m	2:09.94	Ellen Schaef	New Zealand	April 2016	2016 Championships	(French Polynesia) Papeete, Tahiti	
1500 m	4:32.37	Ellen Schaef	New Zealand	April 2016	2016 Championships	(French Polynesia) Papeete, Tahiti	
5000 m	19:35.47	Sophie Bouchonnet	French Polynesia	April 2016	2016 Championships	(French Polynesia) Papeete, Tahiti	
10,000 m	43:22.71	Elodie Menou	French Polynesia	April 2016	2016 Championships	(French Polynesia) Papeete, Tahiti	
100 m hurdles	15.04 (−0.3 m/s)	Terani Faremiro	French Polynesia	August 2009	2009 Championships	Gold Coast, Australia	
400 m hurdles	1:11.53	Mele To'a	Tonga	August 2009	2009 Championships	Gold Coast, Australia	
High jump	1.68 m	Mihiatea Gooding	French Polynesia	April 2016	2016 Championships	(French Polynesia) Papeete, Tahiti	
Pole vault	2.50 m	Lucie Tepea	French Polynesia	April 2016	2016 Championships	(French Polynesia) Papeete, Tahiti	
Long jump	5.19 m (nw)	Kalina Mamao	Tonga	October 2007	2007 Championships	Rarotonga, Cook Islands	
Triple jump	11.08 m (+0.8 m/s)	Terani Faremiro	French Polynesia	August 2009	2009 Championships	Gold Coast, Australia	
Shot put	13.92 m	Margaret Satupai	Samoa	August 2009	2009 Championships	Gold Coast, Australia	
Discus throw	45.69 m	Margaret Satupai	Samoa	August 2009	2009 Championships	Gold Coast, Australia	
Hammer throw	38.93 m	Siniva Marsters	Cook Islands	August 2009	2009 Championships	Gold Coast, Australia	
Javelin throw	51.54 m	Patsy Akeli	Samoa	August 2009	2009 Championships	Gold Coast, Australia	
4 × 100 m relay	49.87		Tonga	August 2009	2009 Championships	Gold Coast, Australia	
4 × 400 m relay	4:29.27		Tonga	August 2009	2009 Championships	Gold Coast, Australia	

== Mixed ==
Event	Record	Athlete	Nationality	Date	Championships	Place	Ref.
Mixed Sprint medley relay	1:42.30	Anita Fasi; Soape Polutele; Taina Halasima; Heamatangi Tu'ivai	Tonga	April 2016	2016 Championships	(French Polynesia) Papeete, Tahiti	
