= 2005 Micronesian Championships in Athletics =

II Micronesian Championships in Athletics
- Dates: December 14–15
- Host city: Saipan, Northern Mariana Islands
- Venue: Oleai Sports Complex
- Level: Senior
- Events: 32 (17 men, 14 women, 1 mixed)
- Participation: 7 nations

The 2005 Micronesian Championships in Athletics took place between December 14–15, 2005. The event was held at the Oleai Sports Complex in Saipan, Northern Mariana Islands. Detailed reports were given for the OAA.

== Medal summary ==
Medal winners and their results were published on the Athletics Weekly webpage. Complete results can be found on the Oceania Athletics Association webpage.

=== Men ===
Event	First		Second		Third	
100 metres (wind: +0.6 m/s)	Jack Howard; Federated States of Micronesia	11.18	Tyrone Omar; Northern Mariana Islands	11.21	Rikko Thoma; Nauru	11.50
200 metres (wind: +0.8 m/s)	Tyrone Omar; Northern Mariana Islands	23.00 CR	Jack Howard; Federated States of Micronesia	23.05	Rikko Thoma; Nauru	23.58
400 metres	Jack Howard; Federated States of Micronesia	52.87	Toom Annaua; Kiribati	52.98	Elterson Rodriguez; Federated States of Micronesia	53.21
800 metres	David Townsel; Guam	2:10.02	Toby Castro; Guam	2:12.34	Ketson Kabiriel; Northern Mariana Islands	2:12.76
1500 metres	Toby Castro; Guam	4:23.79	David Townsel; Guam	4:29.40	Tekooki Teieka; Kiribati	4:34.46
5000 metres	Toby Castro; Guam	18:16.61	Jay Antonio; Guam	18:17.26	Detwin Ichuro; Federated States of Micronesia	18:59.61
10000 metres	Jay Antonio; Guam	38:27.44	Toby Castro; Guam	38:44.20	Chang Jang Wang; Northern Mariana Islands	41:00.75
110 metres hurdles (wind: -0.2 m/s)	Dexter Dillay; Northern Mariana Islands	17.43	Kenneth Karosich; Guam	17.68		
High jump	Donovan Helvey; Palau	1.81	Buraieta Yeeting; Kiribati	1.81	Jeff Saures; Northern Mariana Islands	1.55
Long jump	Buraieta Yeeting; Kiribati	6.30 w (wind: +3.4 m/s)	Dexter Dillay; Northern Mariana Islands	6.04 (wind: +1.8 m/s)	Jeff Saures; Northern Mariana Islands	5.61 (wind: +1.1 m/s)
Triple jump	Buraieta Yeeting; Kiribati	13.35 (wind: +0.3 m/s) CR	Rafaelito Deausen; Guam	11.82 (wind: +0.8 m/s)	Jon Paulino; Guam	11.02 (wind: +0.4 m/s)
Shot put	Justin Andre; Guam	13.39 CR	Tunia Kaotirake; Kiribati	11.56	Rais Aho; Marshall Islands	11.31
Discus throw	Justin Andre; Guam	40.44 CR	Tunia Kaotirake; Kiribati	34.56	Sidro Tebuteb; Northern Mariana Islands	32.57
Hammer throw	Justin Andre; Guam	47.63	Tunia Kaotirake; Kiribati	26.81	Sidro Tebuteb; Northern Mariana Islands	24.96
Javelin throw	Nick Gross; Northern Mariana Islands	56.26	Dallas Oketol; Palau	45.63	Sngebard Delong; Palau	45.36
Octathlon	Rabangaki Nawai; Kiribati	4496	Nicholas Mangham; Palau	4243		
4 x 100 metres relay	Federated States of Micronesia; Keitani Graham; Jenson Wendolin; Elterson Rodriguez; Jack Howard	44.60	Kiribati; Kirimauti Kaiea; Rabangaki Nawai; Toom Annaua; Buraieta Yeeting	45.13	Nauru; Quaski Itaia; Aneri Fredrick Canon; JJ Capelle; Rikko Thoma	45.32

=== Women ===
Event	First		Second		Third	
100 metres (wind: +3.4 m/s)	Ngerak Florencio; Palau	12.94 w	Rosa-Mystique Jone; Nauru	13.21 w	Dana Thoma; Nauru	13.54 w
200 metres (wind: +1.0 m/s)	Ngerak Florencio; Palau	26.33 CR	Rosa-Mystique Jone; Nauru	27.11	Dana Thoma; Nauru	27.93
400 metres	Ngerak Florencio; Palau	63.53 CR	Jacque Wonenberg; Northern Mariana Islands	65.28	Avon Grace Mazo; Palau	65.55
800 metres	Leana Peters; Guam	2:31.59 CR	Bo Wang; Northern Mariana Islands	2:31.88	Jacque Wonenberg; Northern Mariana Islands	2:35.66
1500 metres	Leana Peters; Guam	5:07.97 CR	Noriko Jim; Northern Mariana Islands	5:08.47	Nicole Layson; Guam	5:14.18
5000 metres	Noriko Jim; Northern Mariana Islands	19:44.28	Leana Peters; Guam	21:06.18	Nicole Layson; Guam	21:24.71
100 metres hurdles	Cora Low; Guam	17.72				
High jump	Felicia Saburo; Palau	1.35	Jacque Wonenberg; Northern Mariana Islands	1.20	Dena Ngeirchongor; Northern Mariana Islands	1.15
Long jump	Felicia Saburo; Palau	4.62 (wind: +1.7 m/s) CR	Detsalena Stephen; Nauru	4.27 (wind: +0.9 m/s)	Rosa-Mystique Jone; Nauru	4.25 w (wind: +2.6 m/s)
Shot put	Chandis Cooper; Palau	10.58 CR	Tracey Duburiya; Nauru	9.05	Doris Rangamar; Northern Mariana Islands	8.96
Discus throw	Chandis Cooper; Palau	29.77 CR	Tracey Duburiya; Nauru	29.51	Doris Rangamar; Northern Mariana Islands	29.16
Hammer throw	Taatia Riino; Kiribati	28.75	Tracey Duburiya; Nauru	17.70	Aiko Imbat; Guam	15.53
Javelin throw	Doris Rangamar; Northern Mariana Islands	25.71	Taatia Riino; Kiribati	22.95	Arcy Moncrief; Northern Mariana Islands	22.66
4 x 100 metres relay	Nauru; Dana Thoma; Detsalena Stephen; Kara Thoma; Rosa-Mystique Jone	53.59	Federated States of Micronesia; Sam Twinsanne; Marselihna Wendolin; Mihter Wendolin; Evangeleen Ikelap	53.64	Northern Mariana Islands; Reylynn Sapong; Locsina Lyza; Liamwar Rangamar; Jacque Wonenberg	58.36

=== Mixed ===
Event	First		Second		Third	
800 metres Medley relay	Federated States of Micronesia; Evangeleen Ikelap; Jack Howard; Marselihna Wendolin; Elterson Rodriguez	1:46.23	Nauru; Rosa-Mystique Jone; Rikko Thoma; Kara Thoma; JJ Capelle	1:47.19	Northern Mariana Islands; Reylynn Sapong; Tyrone Omar; Jacque Wonenberg; Darrel Roligat	1:49.12

== Medal table (unofficial) ==
The host country is highlighted in lavender blue

1	Guam	10	7	4	21
2	Palau	8	2	2	12
3	Northern Mariana Islands	5	6	13	24
4	Kiribati	4	7	1	12
5	Federated States of Micronesia	4	2	2	8
6	Nauru	1	7	6	14
7	Marshall Islands	0	0	1	1
