= Chris Walasi =

Sprinter from the Solomon Islands

Personal information
- Full name: Chris Meke Walasi
- Nationality: Solomon Islands
- Born: 18 May 1980 (age 46) Sulufou, Malaita Province
- Height: 170 cm (5 ft 7 in)
- Weight: 70 kg (154 lb)

Sport
- Sport: Athletics
- Event: 100 metres
Medal record
Men's athletics
Representing the Solomon Islands
(South) Pacific Games
Bronze medal – third place	2007 Apia	4x100 m relay
Bronze medal – third place	2003 Suva	4x400 m relay
(South) Pacific Mini Games
Bronze medal – third place	2005 Koror	4x400 m relay
Oceania Championships
Silver medal – second place	2006 Apia	400 m
Bronze medal – third place	2004 Townsville	800 m medley relay
- Updated on 29 April 2013

Chris Meke Walasi (born 18 May 1980) is a sprinter from the Solomon Islands. He came sixth in Heat 3 of the 100 metres Preliminaries at the 2012 Summer Olympics.

== Personal bests ==
Event	Result	Venue	Date
Outdoor
100 m	10.78 s (wind: +1.3 m/s)	(Australia) Melbourne	19 Mar 2006
200 m	21.85 s (wind: -0.7 m/s)	(New Zealand) Hamilton	14 Dec 2005
400 m	47.76 s	(New Zealand) Christchurch	27 Jan 2006
Indoor
60 m	7.47 s	(Turkey) Istanbul	9 Mar 2012
200 m	23.83 s	(Hungary) Budapest	6 Mar 2004

== Achievements ==
Year	Competition	Venue	Position	Event	Notes
Representing the Solomon Islands
2003	South Pacific Games	Suva, Fiji	6th	400m	48.85
2003	South Pacific Games	Suva, Fiji	4th	4 × 100 m relay	42.38
2003	South Pacific Games	Suva, Fiji	3rd	4 × 400 m relay	3:21.55 min
2004	World Indoor Championships	Budapest, Hungary	26th (h)	200m	23.83
2004	Oceania Championships	Townsville, Australia	6th	200m	22.53 w (wind: +3.8 m/s)
2004	Oceania Championships	Townsville, Australia	4th	400m	48.81
2004	Oceania Championships	Townsville, Australia	3rd	800 m medley relay	1:35.48 min
2005	South Pacific Mini Games	Koror, Palau	4th	400m	50.03
2005	South Pacific Mini Games	Koror, Palau	4th	4 × 100 m relay	43.65
2005	South Pacific Mini Games	Koror, Palau	3rd	4 × 400 m relay	3:28.15 min
2005	World Championships	Helsinki, Finland	47th (h)	400m	49.47
2006	Oceania Championships	Apia, Samoa	6th	100m	11.05 (wind: -0.3 m/s)
2006	Oceania Championships	Apia, Samoa	6th	200m	21.89 (wind: +1.6 m/s)
2006	Oceania Championships	Apia, Samoa	2nd	400 m	48.62 s
2006	Oceania Championships	Apia, Samoa	4th	4 × 100 m relay	42.33
2007	Melanesian Championships	Cairns, Queensland, Australia	5th	100m	11.15 (wind: -2.4 m/s)
2007	Melanesian Championships	Cairns, Queensland, Australia	5th	200m	22.06 (wind: -2.7 m/s)
2007	Melanesian Championships	Cairns, Queensland, Australia	9th (h)	400m	49.17
2007	Melanesian Championships	Cairns, Queensland, Australia	3rd	4 × 100 m relay	42.75
2007	Pacific Games	Apia, Samoa	7th	100m	11.01 (wind: +0.7 m/s)
2007	Pacific Games	Apia, Samoa	3rd	4 × 100 m relay	41.55 s
2007	World Championships	Osaka, Japan	52nd (h)	100m	11.07 (wind: -1.5 m/s)
2008	Oceania Championships	Saipan, Northern Mariana Islands	9th (sf)	100m	11.38 (wind: -2.4 m/s)
2008	Oceania Championships	Saipan, Northern Mariana Islands	7th	200m	22.59 (wind: -0.9 m/s)
2008	Oceania Championships	Saipan, Northern Mariana Islands	4th	4 × 100 m relay	43.12
2010	Oceania Championships	Cairns, Queensland, Australia	13th (sf)	100m	11.26 (wind: -0.9 m/s)
2010	Oceania Championships	Cairns, Queensland, Australia	11th (h)	200m	22.63 (wind: -0.6 m/s)
2010	Oceania Championships	Cairns, Queensland, Australia	—	4 × 100 m relay	DQ
2012	World Indoor Championships	Istanbul, Turkey	47th (h)	60 m	7.47
2012	Olympic Games	London, United Kingdom	69th (pr)	100 m	11.42 (wind: +1.7 m/s)
2014	Oceania Championships	Rarotonga, Cook Islands	13th (sf)	100m	11.87 (wind: +0.1 m/s)
2014	Oceania Championships	Rarotonga, Cook Islands	12th (h)	200m	24.17 w (wind: +6.1 m/s)
2014	Oceania Championships	Rarotonga, Cook Islands	6th	4 × 100 m relay	44.98
