= 2011 Oceania Athletics Championships =

- Dates: June 21–23
- Host city: Apia, Samoa
- Venue: Apia Park
- Level: Senior
- Events: 35 (18 men, 17 women)
- Participation: 144 (77 east, 67 west) athletes from 22 (11 east, 11 west) nations

The 2011 Oceania Athletics Championships were held at the Apia Park in Apia, Samoa, between June 21–23, 2011.

There were significant changes in the format of the competition. Medals are now awarded in both of the newly formed two regional divisions "East" and "West".

A total of 35 events were contested, 18 by men and 17 by women.

== Regional Division East ==
=== Medal summary ===
Complete results can be found on the Oceania Athletics Association webpage.

==== Men ====
Event	Gold		Silver		Bronze	
100 metres (wind: +1.2 m/s)	Banuve Tabakaucoro (FIJ)	10.46	Lepani Naivalu (FIJ)	10.82	Andy Lui (TGA)	10.82
200 metres (wind: +1.9 m/s)	Banuve Tabakaucoro (FIJ)	21.01	Lepani Naivalu (FIJ)	22.14	Cameron French (NZL)	22.21
400 metres	Benjamino Maravu (FIJ)	47.93	Siuloga Viliamu (SAM)	50.78		
800 metres	Varasiko Toge Tomeru (FIJ)	1:55.02	Rick Mou (PYF)	2:06.10	Jezmond Papu (ASA)	2:43.65
1500 metres	Varasiko Toge Tomeru (FIJ)	4:20.69	Rick Mou (PYF)	4:23.58		
5000 metres	Nordine Benfodda (NCL)	15:39.61	Francky Maraetaata (PYF)	17:04.38	Sébastien Guesdon (NCL)	17:20.27
10000 metres	Nordine Benfodda (NCL)	33:08.99	Francky Maraetaata (PYF)	35:12.90		
110 metres hurdles (wind: -1.4 m/s)	Ah Chong Sam Chong (SAM)	17.30	Darren Tinai (SAM)	17.87		
400 metres hurdles	Cameron French (NZL)	54.25	Phil Simms (NZL)	54.42	Roy Ravana (FIJ)	56.69
High jump	Raihau Maiau (PYF)	2.02m	Daniel Griffiths (NFK)	1.70m		
Long jump	Raihau Maiau (PYF)	7.58m (wind: -4.3 m/s)	Ryan Howe (NZL)	7.22m (wind: -0.2 m/s)	Okilani Tinilau (TUV)	7.02m (wind: -0.6 m/s)
Triple jump	Scott Thomson (NZL)	14.39m (wind: +0.8 m/s)	Raihau Maiau (PYF)	14.29m (wind: +1.8 m/s)	Okilani Tinilau (TUV)	13.61m (wind: -1.1 m/s)
Shot put	Emanuele Fuamatu (SAM)	17.79m	Shaka Sola (SAM)	15.29m	Hau I Hetesi Sakalia (TGA)	12.53m
Discus throw	Shaka Sola (SAM)	43.10m	Emanuele Fuamatu (SAM)	42.14m	JiNam Hopotoa (NIU)	38.97m
Hammer throw	Emanuele Fuamatu (SAM)	46.70m	Shaka Sola (SAM)	36.04m		
Javelin throw	Ben Langton-Burnell (NZL)	59.65m	Franco Patu (SAM)	57.56m	Michael Jackson (NIU)	49.04m
4 x 100 metres relay	Fiji; Benjamino Maravu; Lepani Naivalu; Roy Ravana; Banuve Tabakaucoro	41.71	New Zealand; Ryan Howe; Zac Topping; Cameron French; Phil Simms	42.41	Samoa; Siuloga Viliamu; John Bosco Stowers; Pesamino Ivo; Wayne Aimaasu	43.84
4 x 400 metres relay	Fiji; Roy Ravana; Benjamino Maravu; Varasiko Toge Tomeru; Banuve Tabakaucoro	3:17.62	New Zealand; Phil Simms; Ryan Howe; Zac Topping; Cameron French	3:28.30	Samoa; Siuloga Viliamu; Titi Fiaalii; Jack Matoka; Fred Peni	3:36.44

==== Women ====
Event	Gold		Silver		Bronze	
100 metres (wind: +1.7 m/s)	Elenoa Sailosi (FIJ)	12.46	Kelsey Berryman (NZL)	12.51	Mariah Ririnui (NZL)	12.74
200 metres (wind: +1.2 m/s)	Elenoa Sailosi (FIJ)	25.39	Suliana Batirau Gusuivalu (FIJ)	25.79	Tracey Hale (NZL)	25.98
400 metres	Miriama Senokonoko (FIJ)	56.44	Suliana Batirau Gusuivalu (FIJ)	57.57	Toimata Mooria (PYF)	64.64
5000 metres	Anne-Sophie Barle (PYF)	19:31.91	Isabelle Oblet (NCL)	19:48.65	Mereseini Naidau (FIJ)	19:52.67
10000 metres	Anne-Sophie Barle (PYF)	41:46.53	Isabelle Oblet (NCL)	42:55.40		
100 metres hurdles (wind: +0.3 m/s)	Kelsey Berryman (NZL)	14.78	Kiana Tuituimoeao Mu'amoholeva (TGA)	17.49		
400 metres hurdles	Tracey Hale (NZL)	61.60	Ana Kaloucava (FIJ)	66.79		
High jump	Emma Sutherland (NZL)	1.65m				
Pole vault	Dolores Dogba (PYF)	3.00m				
Long jump	Mariah Ririnui (NZL)	5.62m (wind: -3.6 m/s)	Kelsey Berryman (NZL)	5.46m (wind: -0.7 m/s)	Sopolemalama Tuitama (SAM)	5.19m (wind: -1.6 m/s)
Triple jump	Ana Katiloka (TGA)	11.17m (wind: -0.9 m/s)	Kiana Tuituimoeao Mu'amoholeva (TGA)	10.80m (wind: +1.6 m/s)	Sopolemalama Tuitama (SAM)	10.31m (wind: -0.7 m/s)
Shot put	Margaret Satupai (SAM)	15.43m	Chei Kenneally (NZL)	13.04m	Tereapii Tapoki (COK)	12.91m
Discus throw	Margaret Satupai (SAM)	47.12m	Tereapii Tapoki (COK)	46.21m	Jolyn Iro (COK)	26.70m
Hammer throw	Margaret Satupai (SAM)	43.52m	Chei Kenneally (NZL)	42.13m		
Javelin throw	Teruerani Tanepau (PYF)	42.62m	Tori Peeters (NZL)	42.41m	Patricia Taea (COK)	27.67m
4 x 100 metres relay	Fiji; Suliana Batirau Gusuivalu; Ana Kaloucava; Miriama Senokonoko; Elenoa Sailosi	48.09	New Zealand; Tracey Hale; Mariah Ririnui; Emma Sutherland; Kelsey Berryman	50.04		
4 x 400 metres relay	Fiji; Ana Kaloucava; Miriama Senokonoko; Elenoa Sailosi; Suliana Batirau Gusuivalu	4:03.57	New Zealand; Tracey Hale; Tori Peeters; Mariah Ririnui; Kelsey Berryman	4:34.77		

=== Medal table East (unofficial) ===
A medal table was published for both east and west divisions.

* Host nation (Samoa)

Rank	Nation	Gold	Silver	Bronze	Total
1	Fiji (FIJ)	12	5	2	19
2	New Zealand (NZL)	7	11	3	21
3	Samoa (SAM)*	7	6	4	17
4	French Polynesia (PYF)	6	5	1	12
5	New Caledonia (NCL)	2	2	1	5
6	Tonga (TON)	1	2	2	5
7	Cook Islands (COK)	0	1	3	4
8	Norfolk Island (NFK)	0	1	0	1
9	Niue (NIU)	0	0	2	2
9	Tuvalu (TUV)	0	0	2	2
11	American Samoa (ASA)	0	0	1	1
Totals (11 entries)		35	33	21	89

=== Participation East (unofficial) ===
The participation of 77 athletes from 11 countries from the east region could be determined.

East regional division:

- American Samoa (7)
- Cook Islands (3)
- Fiji (10)
- French Polynesia (9)
- New Caledonia (4)
- New Zealand (12)
- Niue (6)
- Norfolk Island (1)
- Samoa (18)
- Tonga (4)
- Tuvalu (3)

== Regional Division West ==
=== Medal summary ===
Complete results can be found on the Oceania Athletics Association webpage.

==== Men ====
Event	Gold		Silver		Bronze	
100 metres (wind: +0.7 m/s)	Kupun Wisil (PNG)	10.96	Roman Cress (MHL)	11.10	Jimmy Noklam (VAN)	11.32
200 metres (wind: +0.8 m/s)	Roman Cress (MHL)	22.54	Reginald Monagi (PNG)	23.31	Rodman Teltull (PLW)	23.37
400 metres	Mowen Boino (PNG)	48.05	Ethan Millward (AUS)	49.18	David Benjimen (VAN)	49.30
800 metres	Arnold Sorina (VAN)	1:54.64	Kevin Kapmatana (PNG)	1:56.12	Michael Gaitan (GUM)	2:03.54
1500 metres	Derek Mandell (GUM)	4:04.59	Michael Gaitan (GUM)	4:20.95	Joshua Illustre (GUM)	4:47.17
5000 metres	Kupsy Bisamo (PNG)	16:12.94	Philip Nausien (VAN)	16:23.37	Masick Tena (SOL)	16:35.75
10000 metres	Kupsy Bisamo (PNG)	33:18.95	Philip Nausien (VAN)	34:39.85	Chris Votu (SOL)	35:14.97
3000 metres steeplechase	Chris Votu (SOL)	10:23.12	Philip Nausien (VAN)	10:45.95		
110 metres hurdles (wind: -1.4 m/s)	Reginald Monagi (PNG)	16.40	Michael Herreros (GUM)	17.31	Clayton Kenty (NMI)	17.43
400 metres hurdles^{†}	Mowen Boino (PNG)	51.88	David Benjimen (VAN)	52.94		
High jump	Joshua Hall (AUS)	2.19m	David Jessem (PNG)	1.99m	Reginald Monagi (PNG)	1.85m
Pole vault	Reginald Monagi (PNG)	3.20m				
Long jump	Boitu Baiteke (KIR)	6.52m (wind: -3.6 m/s)	Reginald Monagi (PNG)	6.03m (wind: -1.5 m/s)	Jonavin Ichihara (NMI)	5.66m (wind: -0.7 m/s)
Triple jump	Boitu Baiteke (KIR)	13.90m (wind: +0.5 m/s)				
Shot put	Joseph Dabana (NRU)	14.16m				
Discus throw	Mitchell Cooper (AUS)	45.51m	Drew Potts (AUS)	36.28m	Reginald Monagi (PNG)	33.03m
Javelin throw	Reginald Monagi (PNG)	44.54m	Emelido Digno (MHL)	39.10m		
4 x 400 metres relay	Vanuatu; Arnold Sorina; Philip Nausien; Jimmy Noklam; David Benjimen	3:23.23				

^{†}: Nathan McConchie (AUS) was listed 4th in 59.59, but there was no information on the 3rd.

==== Women ====
Event	Gold		Silver		Bronze	
100 metres (wind: +0.5 m/s)	Madeleine Powell (AUS)	12.34	Helen Philemon (PNG)	12.58	Yvonne Bennet (NMI)	12.59
200 metres (wind: +0.7 m/s)	Venessa Waro (PNG)	25.45	Helen Philemon (PNG)	25.59	Yvonne Bennet (NMI)	25.70
400 metres	Yvonne Bennet (NMI)	57.66	Venessa Waro (PNG)	57.85	Naomi Blaz (GUM)	60.12
800 metres	Emma Dick (AUS)	2:18.99	Amy Atkinson (GUM)	2:25.94	Eunice Steven (PNG)	2:26.10
1500 metres	Emma Dick (AUS)	4:53.88	Amy Atkinson (GUM)	5:04.64	Sharon Kikini Firisua (SOL)	5:06.23
5000 metres	Amy Atkinson (GUM)	19:53.13	Dainah Matekali (SOL)	21:12.18	Bibiana Tinan (PLW)	27:11.59
10000 metres	Dainah Matekali (SOL)	43:12.64				
100 metres hurdles (wind: +0.3 m/s)	Madeleine Powell (AUS)	14.34	Eunice Steven (PNG)	16.94	Sierra Daughtry (GUM)	17.88
400 metres hurdles	Lisa Spencer (AUS)	60.77	Sierra Daughtry (GUM)	70.73	Alex Daughtry (GUM)	73.67
High jump	Tara Strano (AUS)	1.71m	Teagan Harris (AUS)	1.71m	Eunice Steven (PNG)	1.50m
Long jump	Helen Philemon (PNG)	5.45m (wind: -3.4 m/s)	Eunice Steven (PNG)	4.69m (wind: -1.3 m/s)	Kaingauee David (KIR)	4.52m (wind: -1.2 m/s)
Triple jump	Naomi Blaz (GUM)	9.88m (wind: +1.3 m/s)	Kaingauee David (KIR)	9.51m (wind: +1.4 m/s)		
Shot put	Rebecca Direen (AUS)	12.27m	Nina Grundler (NRU)	10.08m	Eunice Steven (PNG)	8.86m
Discus throw	Nina Grundler (NRU)	29.01m				
Hammer throw	Rebecca Direen (AUS)	49.01m				
Javelin throw	Eunice Steven (PNG)	32.71m				
4 x 100 metres relay	Australia; Tara Strano; Madeleine Powell; Lisa Spencer; Emma Dick	49.99				

=== Medal table West (unofficial) ===
A medal table was published for both east and west divisions.

Rank	Nation	Gold	Silver	Bronze	Total
1	Papua New Guinea (PNG)	11	9	5	25
2	Australia (AUS)	11	3	0	14
3	Guam (GUM)	3	5	5	13
4	Vanuatu (VAN)	2	4	2	8
5	Solomon Islands (SOL)	2	1	3	6
6	Kiribati (KIR)	2	1	1	4
7	Nauru (NRU)	2	1	0	3
8	Marshall Islands (MHL)	1	2	0	3
9	Northern Mariana Islands (NMI)	1	0	4	5
10	Palau (PLW)	0	0	2	2
Totals (10 entries)		35	26	22	83

=== Participation West (unofficial) ===
The participation of 67 athletes from 11 countries from the west region could be determined.

West regional division:

- Australia (12)
- Guam (14)
- Kiribati (4)
- Marshall Islands (4)
- Federated States of Micronesia (4)
- Nauru (4)
- Northern Mariana Islands (4)
- Palau (4)
- Papua New Guinea (8)
- Solomon Islands (4)
- Vanuatu (5)
