= 2003 Micronesian Championships in Athletics =

I Micronesian Championships in Athletics
- Dates: April 25–26
- Host city: Koror, Palau
- Level: Senior
- Events: 29 (14 men, 14 women, 1 mixed)

The 2003 Micronesian Championships in Athletics took place between April 25–26, 2003. The event was held in Koror, Palau.

A total of 29 events were contested, 14 by men, 14 by women and 1 mixed. In addition, there was a mixed non-championship hammer throwing competition for both men and women including Australian guest athletes.

== Medal summary ==
Medal winners and their results were published on the Athletics Weekly webpage.

=== Men ===
Event	Gold		Silver		Bronze	
100 metres (wind: -1.7 m/s)	Jack Howard; Federated States of Micronesia	11.09	John Howard; Federated States of Micronesia	11.19	Danny Fredrick; Federated States of Micronesia	11.41
200 metres (wind: +0.2 m/s)	Danny Fredrick; Federated States of Micronesia	23.39	Peter Donis Rudolf; Federated States of Micronesia	23.49	Russell Ward Roman; Palau	23.71
400 metres	Jack Howard; Federated States of Micronesia	50.88	Ashley Kazuma; Palau	52.25	Russell Ward Roman; Palau	52.50
800 metres	Neil Weare; Guam	2:03.96	Derek Mandell; Guam	2:08.11	Moikeha Keogh; Palau	2:10.43
1500 metres	Neil Weare; Guam	4:14.56	Derek Mandell; Guam	4:31.12	Nicholas Mangham; Palau	4:34.76
5000 metres	Neil Weare; Guam	17:51.56	Derek Mandell; Guam	18:25.44	Rendelius Germinaro; Federated States of Micronesia	18:26.81
High jump	Donovan Helvey; Palau	1.82	Ketson Kabiriel; Northern Mariana Islands	1.60		
Long jump	Rabangaki Nawai; Kiribati	6.20	McKnight McArthur; Palau	6.04	Clayton Maluwelgiye; Federated States of Micronesia	5.90
Triple jump	Bwaraniko Paul; Kiribati	12.82	Taburimai Tewaki; Kiribati	12.00	McKnight McArthur; Palau	11.65
Shot put	Jersey Iyar; Palau	12.71	Steve Carrerra; Palau	12.56	Alipate Raikadroka; Palau	11.66
Discus throw	Clayton Maluwelgiye; Federated States of Micronesia	36.56	Jersey Iyar; Palau	33.48	Gerard Jones; Nauru	33.06
Hammer throw^{†}	Steve Carrerra; Palau	35.67	Barry Mullins; Australia	30.23	Fletcher McEwen; Australia	28.73
Javelin throw	Clayton Maluwelgiye; Federated States of Micronesia	56.94	Jersey Iyar; Palau	52.10	Rabangaki Nawai; Kiribati	47.34
4 x 100 metres relay	Federated States of Micronesia	43.73	Palau	45.64	Northern Mariana Islands	46.99
4 x 400 metres relay	Federated States of Micronesia	3:29.27	Palau	3:36.40	Northern Mariana Islands	3:42.20

^{†}: non-championship event

=== Women ===
Event	Gold		Silver		Bronze	
100 metres (wind: -0.6 m/s)	Ngerak Florencio; Palau	12.90	Rosa-Mystique Jone; Nauru	13.07	Desiree Craggette; Guam	13.31
200 metres (wind: +0.2 m/s)	Ngerak Florencio; Palau	27.22	Rosa-Mystique Jone; Nauru	27.96	Desiree Craggette; Guam	28.01
400 metres	Ngerak Florencio; Palau	65.20	Vangie Mercado; Federated States of Micronesia	65.90	Rae Detabene; Nauru	67.98
800 metres	Christine Vicente; Guam	2:36.69	Avon Grace Mazo; Palau	2:39.15	Banrenga Baikia; Kiribati	2:54.48
1500 metres	Christine Vicente; Guam	5:38.43	Banrenga Baikia; Kiribati	5:59.25	Jaceleen Pluhs; Federated States of Micronesia	6:25.24
3000 metres	Christine Vicente; Guam	12:03.62	Avon Grace Mazo; Palau	12:36.74	Banrenga Baikia; Kiribati	12:41.75
High jump	Carrissa Dkar Subris; Palau	1.52	Barbara Gbewonyo; Palau	1.40	Kimaia Dan Murdoch; Kiribati	1.35
Long jump	Kaitinano Mwemweata; Kiribati	4.50	Barbara Gbewonyo; Palau	4.39	Connie Camacho; Northern Mariana Islands	4.28
Triple jump	Barbara Gbewonyo; Palau	8.78				
Shot put	Chandis Cooper; Palau	10.38	Maleah Umerang Tengadik; Palau	9.49	Cristabel Gbewonyo; Palau	9.15
Discus throw	Chandis Cooper; Palau	28.94	Julie Tokyo; Northern Mariana Islands	27.61	Kimaia Dan Murdoch; Kiribati	27.10
Hammer throw^{†}	Christina Duenas; Guam	18.94				
Javelin throw	Maleah Umerang Tengadik; Palau	36.97	Julie Tokyo; Northern Mariana Islands	30.54	Christina Duenas; Guam	27.11
4 x 100 metres relay	Palau A	51.89	Nauru	53.45	Palau B	53.93
4 x 400 metres relay	Palau	4:35.89	Nauru	4:49.18		

^{†}: non-championship event

=== Mixed ===
Event	Gold		Silver		Bronze	
800 metres Medley relay	Palau	1:42:28	Nauru	1:45.51	Kiribati	1:47.37

== Medal table (unofficial) ==
* Host nation (Palau)

Rank	Nation	Gold	Silver	Bronze	Total
1	Palau (PLW)*	13	12	8	33
2	Federated States of Micronesia (FSM)	7	3	4	14
3	Guam (GUM)	6	3	3	12
4	Kiribati (KIR)	3	2	6	11
5	Nauru (NRU)	0	5	2	7
6	Northern Mariana Islands (NMI)	0	3	3	6
Totals (6 entries)		29	28	26	83
