= Amy Atkinson =

American sprinter and middle distance runner (born 1989)

Personal information
- Nationality: Guam
- Born: August 5, 1989 (age 37) Ostfildern, Baden-Württemberg, West Germany
- Height: 1.65 m (5 ft 5 in)
- Weight: 55 kg (121 lb)

Sport
- Sport: Athletics
Medal record
Women's Athletics
Representing Guam
Micronesian Games
Gold medal – first place	2010 Koror	1500 m
Silver medal – second place	2010 Koror	800 m
Silver medal – second place	2010 Koror	4 × 400 m relay
Oceania Championships
Gold medal – first place	2011 Apia	5000 m
Silver medal – second place	2011 Apia	800 m
Silver medal – second place	2011 Apia	1500 m
Bronze medal – third place	2012 Cairns	1500 m
Association football career
- Position: Defender
Youth career
- 2003–2007: George Washington Geckos
College career
Years	Team	Apps	(Gls)
2007–2010	Biola Eagles	56	(0)
International career
- Guam

Amy Atkinson (born August 5, 1989) is a sprinter and middle-distance runner and former association football player from Guam. She competed in the 2010 Guam Athletics Championships where she won three gold medals. Atkinson took part in the 2011 Pacific Games, where she broke the national record for the Women's 3000m steeplechase event, which she still holds. Atkinson represented Guam in Istanbul at the Women's 400m event at the 2012 IAAF World Indoor Championships. Atkinson also competed in the Women's 800m event at the 2012 Summer Olympics in London, but did not advance to the semifinals. She broke the national 800m record with a time of 2:18.53.

== Early life and education ==
Amy Atkinson graduated with an elementary education degree from Biola University. She played on Biola's soccer team, as well as Guam women's national football team.

== Olympic career ==
Atkinson qualified for the 2012 Summer Olympics in the 800 m middle-distance race with a universality placement. Atkinson broke a record that stood for 22 years, with a time of 2:18.53. Her personal best prior to this was 2:21.30. There were five runners in her heat, and she was as high as second place at the end of the first lap. Her competitors pulled ahead, and she finished last in her heat, failing to advance to the semifinals.

== Pacific Games ==
During the 2011 Pacific Games, Atkinson broke 5 minutes in the 1,500 m for the first time.

== Achievements ==
Year	Competition	Venue	Position	Event	Notes
Representing Guam
2010	Micronesian Games	Koror, Palau	2nd	800 m	
2010	Micronesian Games	Koror, Palau	1st	1500 m	
2010	Micronesian Games	Koror, Palau	2nd	4 × 400 m relay	
2011	Oceania Championships (Regional Division West)	Apia, Samoa	2nd	800 m	
2011	Oceania Championships (Regional Division West)	Apia, Samoa	2nd	1500 m	
2011	Oceania Championships (Regional Division West)	Apia, Samoa	1st	5000 m	
2012	Oceania Championships (Regional Division West)	Cairns, Australia	3rd	1500 m	4:57.76 min
