= Emanuele Fuamatu =

Samoan athletics competitor

Personal information
- Full name: Emanuele Tusitatino Tauolo Fuamatu
- Born: 27 October 1989 (age 36) Sydney, Australia
- Education: University of Sydney Bachelor of International Relations and Law
- Height: 1.84 m (6 ft 1/2 in)
- Weight: 140 kg (310 lb)

Sport
- Country: Samoa
- Sport: Athletics
- Event: Shot put
Medal record
Men's athletics
Representing Samoa
Pacific Games
Silver medal – second place	2011 Nouméa	Shot put
Oceania Championships
Gold medal – first place	2012 Cairns	Shot put
Gold medal – first place	2011 Apia	Shot put
Gold medal – first place	2011 Apia	Hammer throw
Silver medal – second place	2011 Apia	Discus throw
Bronze medal – third place	2010 Cairns	Shot put
- Updated on 25 April 2013

Emanuele Tusitatino Tauolo Fuamatu (born 27 October 1989) is a Samoan athlete. He competed for Samoa in shot put at the 2012 Summer Olympics where he did not advance to the final. Fuamatu competed for Australia at the 2005 IAAF World Youth Championships, 2006 IAAF World Junior Championships, and the 2008 IAAF World Junior Championships. Fuamatu was a recipient of the International Olympic Committee Solidarity Scholarship. He holds the current Male NSW Under 16, Under 18, Under 20, and Open Shot Put Records. He is the current Oceania and Australian Champion in the Men's Shot Put. Emanuele Fuamatu won the Shot Put in the Australian Junior Championships in 2005, 2006, 2007 and 2008. His 20.54 metre effort with the 6 kg as a junior ranked him third worldwide in 2008. He attends University in Sydney, Australia, majoring in Law.

Fuamatu won silver at the 2011 Pacific Games with a throw of 18.11 metres.

== Achievements ==
Year	Competition	Venue	Position	Event	Notes
Representing Australia
2006	World Junior Championships	Beijing, China	22nd (q)	Shot put (6 kg)	17.97 m
2008	World Junior Championships	Bydgoszcz, Poland	9th	Shot put (6 kg)	19.11 m
Representing Samoa
2010	Oceania Championships	Cairns, Australia	3rd	Shot put	16.54 m
2011	Oceania Championships (Regional Division East)	Apia, Samoa	1st	Shot put	17.79 m
2011	Oceania Championships (Regional Division East)	Apia, Samoa	2nd	Discus throw	42.14 m
2011	Oceania Championships (Regional Division East)	Apia, Samoa	1st	Hammer throw	46.70 m
2011	Pacific Games	Nouméa, New Caledonia	2nd	Shot put	18.11 m
2012	Oceania Championships (Regional Division East)	Cairns, Australia	1st	Shot put	18.26 m
