= 2009 Micronesian Championships in Athletics =

IV Micronesian Championships in Athletics
- Dates: August 4–8
- Host city: Gold Coast, Queensland, Australia
- Venue: Griffith University
- Level: Senior
- Events: 34 (18 men, 16 women)
- Participation: 64 athletes from 7 nations

The 2009 Micronesian Championships in Athletics took place between August 4–8, 2009. The event was held at the Griffith University in Gold Coast, Queensland, Australia, jointly with the OAA Grand Prix Series, and the OAA sub-regional Melanesian and Polynesian Championships. Many athletes utilised the competitions preparing for the upcoming IAAF World Championships in Berlin, Germany. Detailed reports were given for the OAA.

A total of 34 events were contested, 18 by men and 16 by women.

== Medal summary ==
Complete results can be found on the Oceania Athletics Association webpage, and at sportfieber.pytalhost.com.

In 100 metres, triple jump, and javelin throw, there were separate open competitions for the Micronesian championships and the OAA Grand Prix Series held on different days.

=== Men ===
Event	Gold		Silver		Bronze	
100 metres (wind: -0.4 m/s)	Tyrone Omar; Northern Mariana Islands	11.51	Tanroo Taniera; Kiribati	11.60	JJ Capelle; Nauru	11.78
100 metres Non-Championship Event (Grand Prix Series)	Yondan Namelo; Federated States of Micronesia	12.07 (wind: +0.0 m/s)				
200 metres (wind: +2.9 m/s)	Tyrone Omar; Northern Mariana Islands	23.41 w	George David; Kiribati	23.42 w	Kiakia Tekambwa; Kiribati	23.50 w
400 metres	Kiakia Tekambwa; Kiribati	51.98	Matthew Pangelinan; Guam	52.60	Pahnrasko Ardos; Federated States of Micronesia	54.42
800 metres	Matthew Pangelinan; Guam	2:03.22 CR	Jeofry Limtiaco; Guam	2:04.87	Toby Castro; Guam	2:08.66
1500 metres	Jeofry Limtiaco; Guam	4:19.91	Toby Castro; Guam	4:27.94	Matthew Pangelinan; Guam	4:34.53
5000 metres	Toby Castro; Guam	17:11.03 CR	Kabriel Ketson; Northern Mariana Islands	19:09.81	Matt Manaco; Northern Mariana Islands	20:15.39
10000 metres	Kabriel Ketson; Northern Mariana Islands	40:08.84	Matt Manaco; Northern Mariana Islands	40:14.77	Francis Tkel; Palau	44:30.53
3000 metres steeplechase	Kabriel Ketson; Northern Mariana Islands	11:53.77	Matt Manaco; Northern Mariana Islands	12:20.40		
110 metres hurdles (wind: -0.1 m/s)	Leon Mengloi; Palau	17.37 CR	Michael Herreros; Guam	17.45	Clayton Kenty; Northern Mariana Islands	20.76
400 metres hurdles	Kabriel Ketson; Northern Mariana Islands	64.87	Clayton Kenty; Northern Mariana Islands	66.73	Michael Herreros; Guam	68.95
High jump	David Peter Birati; Kiribati	1.81m	George David; Kiribati	1.75m	Trevor Ogumro; Northern Mariana Islands	1.60m
Long jump	Deamo Baguga; Nauru	6.21m w (wind: +4.3 m/s)	David Peter Birati; Kiribati	6.13m (wind: +0.0 m/s)	Godfrey Quadina; Nauru	6.08m (wind: -1.0 m/s)
Triple jump	David Peter Birati; Kiribati	13.17m (wind: -0.5 m/s)	Buraieta Yeeting; Kiribati	13.16m (wind: +0.0 m/s)	Deamo Baguga; Nauru	12.61m (wind: -0.9 m/s)
Triple jump Non-Championship Event (Grand Prix Series)	Edward Babauta; Guam	12.22m	Godfrey Quadina; Nauru	11.82m		
Shot put	Raobu Tarawa; Kiribati	12.88m	Dougwin Franz; Palau	8.18m		
Discus throw	Raobu Tarawa; Kiribati	38.81m	Dougwin Franz; Palau	23.56m		
Javelin throw	Dougwin Franz; Palau	56.46m	Raobu Tarawa; Kiribati	49.96m	Jesus Iguel; Northern Mariana Islands	38.04m
Javelin throw Non-Championship Event (Grand Prix Series)	Dougwin Franz; Palau	59.91m				
4 x 100 metres relay	Kiribati	44.82	Nauru	45.79	Federated States of Micronesia	46.21
4 x 400 metres relay	Kiribati	3:38.62	Guam	3:39.73	Northern Mariana Islands	3:52.68

=== Women ===
Event	Gold		Silver		Bronze	
100 metres (wind: -0.1 m/s)	Naome Burk; Guam	13.39	Lovelite Detenamo; Nauru; Yvonne Bennet; Northern Mariana Islands	13.39		
200 metres (wind: +1.7 m/s)	Naome Burk; Guam	27.37	Lovelite Detenamo; Nauru	27.44	Yvonne Bennet; Northern Mariana Islands	27.63
400 metres	Yvonne Bennet; Northern Mariana Islands	62.91 CR	Naomi Blaz; Guam	63.96	Yvette Bennet; Northern Mariana Islands	67.57
800 metres	Nicole Layson; Guam	2:38.77	Maria Barcinas; Guam	2:46.08		
1500 metres	Nicole Layson; Guam	5:29.57	Maria Barcinas; Guam	5:46.81	Athena Avery; Guam	5:57.99
5000 metres	Nicole Layson; Guam	20:42.75	Maria Barcinas; Guam	21:52.51	Athena Avery; Guam	22:17.85
100 metres hurdles (wind: -0.3 m/s)	Jacqueline Wonenberg; Northern Mariana Islands	18.31	Andria Cruz; Guam	18.88		
400 metres hurdles	Jacqueline Wonenberg; Northern Mariana Islands	1:12.97	Andria Cruz; Guam	1:27.58		
Long jump	Jacqueline Wonenberg; Northern Mariana Islands	4.66m (wind: +2.0 m/s) CR	Liamwar Rangamar; Northern Mariana Islands	4.41m w (wind: +3. m/s)	Kaitinano Mwemweata; Kiribati	4.22m w (wind: +2.6 m/s)
Triple jump	Jacqueline Wonenberg; Northern Mariana Islands	9.59m (wind: +1.3 m/s) CR	Kaitinano Mwemweata; Kiribati	9.10m (wind: +0.1 m/s)		
Shot put	Genie Gerardo; Guam	9.75m	Nina Grundler; Nauru	8.90m	Jerusha Mau; Nauru	8.55m
Discus throw	Diana Alicto; Guam	27.95m	Jerusha Mau; Nauru	27.38m	Genie Gerardo; Guam	25.93m
Hammer throw	Genie Gerardo; Guam	31.82m CR	Jerusha Mau; Nauru	19.56m	Nina Grundler; Nauru	17.84m
Javelin throw	Liamwar Rangamar; Northern Mariana Islands	30.15m	Kaitinano Mwemweata; Kiribati	27.92m	Diana Alicto; Guam	26.37m
4 x 100 metres relay	Northern Mariana Islands	53.00				
4 x 400 metres relay	Northern Mariana Islands	4:29.31 CR	Guam	4:39.09		

== Medal table (unofficial) ==
Rank	Nation	Gold	Silver	Bronze	Total
1	Northern Mariana Islands (NMI)	13	6	7	26
2	Guam (GUM)	11	12	7	30
3	Kiribati (KIR)	7	8	2	17
4	Palau (PLW)	2	2	1	5
5	Nauru (NRU)	1	6	5	12
6	Federated States of Micronesia (FSM)	0	0	2	2
Totals (6 entries)		34	34	24	92

== Participation ==
According to an unofficial count, 64 athletes from 7 countries participated.

- Guam (15)
- Kiribati (8)
- Marshall Islands (7)
- Federated States of Micronesia (6)
- Nauru (11)
- Northern Mariana Islands (12)
- Palau (5)
