= Jack Iroga =

Solomon Islands sprinter

Personal information
- Nationality: Solomon Islands
- Born: September 29, 1986 (age 39) Malaita
- Height: 175 cm (5.74 ft)
- Weight: 72 kg (159 lb)

Sport
- Sport: Athletics
Medal record
Men's athletics
Representing Solomon Islands
Pacific Games
Bronze medal – third place	2007 Apia	4x100 m relay
Oceania Championships
Bronze medal – third place	2008 Saipan	100 m
Bronze medal – third place	2008 Saipan	800 m medley relay (Mixed)
Bronze medal – third place	2004 Townsville	800 m medley relay
- Updated on 22 April 2013

Jack Iroga (born September 29, 1986) is a sprinter from the Solomon Islands.

== Achievements ==
Year	Competition	Venue	Position	Event	Notes
Representing Solomon Islands
2004	World Junior Championships	Grosseto, Italy	51st (h)	100m	11.32 (wind: +1.8 m/s)
2004	Oceania Championships	Townsville, Australia	3rd	800 m medley relay	1:35.48 min
2007	Pacific Games	Apia, Samoa	3rd	4x100 m relay	41.55 s
2008	Oceania Championships	Saipan, Northern Mariana Islands	3rd	100 m	11.07 s (wind: -1.0 m/s)
2008	Oceania Championships	Saipan, Northern Mariana Islands	3rd	Mixed 800 m medley relay	1:41.26 min
