= Mamiko Oshima-Berger =

Marathon runner from the Northern Mariana Islands

Personal information
- Nationality: Northern Mariana Islands
- Born: Mamiko Oshima; 1989 (age 36–37)

Sport
- Event: Marathon

Achievements and titles
- Personal bests: 3:09:00 (Saipan Marathon, 2012)
Medal record
Women's athletics
Representing Northern Mariana Islands
Micronesian Games
| Gold medal – first place | 2010 Koror | 5000 metres |
| Gold medal – first place | 2010 Koror | 10km road race |
Oceania Area Championships in Athletics
| Bronze medal – third place | 2008 Saipan | Half Marathon |

Mamiko Oshima-Berger (born 1989), also known professionally as Mamiko Oshima, is a marathon runner from the Northern Mariana Islands.

Oshima-Berger has placed first in the Saipan Marathon in 2016, 2015, 2014, 2012, 2009, and 2008. In 2010, she placed second.

At the 2008 Oceania Athletics Championships she placed third in the half marathon, with a time of 1:42:26.67.

At the 2010 Micronesian Games she won gold in the 5000 metres and 10km road race.

In 2011, she was the only athlete from the Pacific islands to compete in the Oceania Marathon and Half Marathon Championships, finishing the event in 3:53.30 and come 183.

In 2014, Oshima-Berger competed in the Emerald Bay Marathon (California), completing the event in 4:40:19.7, placing her 8th in her age range, and 15th overall. The same year she competed in the California-Nevada Marathon, with a time of 4:01:12, and came first in her division and second overall.

Oshima-Berger has competed and set records in several events in the Northern Mariana Islands. As of 2010, she held the record for the Annual POWERade Banzai Memorial Half Marathon & Fun Run and broke the record at the 26th Annual Mt. Tapochao Thanksgiving Day Turkey Trot Fun Run. In December 2010, Oshima-Berger, with Keum Bae Jin, was recognised by the Northern Marianas Amateur Sports Association as Athletes of the Month, and were nominees for Athlete of the Year.

Oshima-Berger's best recorded time for a marathon was 3:09:00 at the Saipan Marathon. She currently holds the women's national record in the marathon for the Northern Mariana Islands as compiled by the International Association of Athletics Federations.
