= Shaka Sola =

Samoan shot putter and discus thrower (born 1977)

Personal information
- Born: March 14, 1977 (age 49) Motootua
- Height: 1.75 m (5 ft 9 in)
- Weight: 110 kg (240 lb)

Sport
- Country: Samoa
- Sport: Athletics
- Event: Shot put
Medal record
Men's athletics
Representing Samoa
(South) Pacific Games
Gold medal – first place	2007 Apia	Shot put
Gold medal – first place	2003 Suva	Discus
Silver medal – second place	2007 Apia	Discus
Silver medal – second place	2003 Suva	Shot put
Bronze medal – third place	2011 Nouméa	Shot put
(South) Pacific Mini Games
Gold medal – first place	2005 Koror	Shot put
Silver medal – second place	2009 Rarotonga	Shot put
Silver medal – second place	2005 Koror	Discus
Oceania Championships
Gold medal – first place	2011 Apia	Discus
Gold medal – first place	2004 Townsville	Shot put
Gold medal – first place	2004 Townsville	Discus
Silver medal – second place	2011 Apia	Shot put
Silver medal – second place	2011 Apia	Hammer
Bronze medal – third place	2014 Rarotonga	Hammer
Bronze medal – third place	2004 Townsville	Hammer
- Updated on 23 May 2015

Shaka Sola (born 14 March 1977) is a Samoan shot putter and discus thrower who became a popular if surprising star at the 2005 World Championships in Athletics.

== Career ==
At the 2005 World Championships in Athletics, Sola arrived late, having missed his flight from Samoa, and did not reach the games until his specialist event (shot put) had completed. As compensation, he asked to be allowed to compete in the javelin, although he had never previously thrown a javelin.

Sola finished last in the event by a considerable distance, throwing the javelin 41.18 metres, over 17 metres less than the next worst competitor. He was roundly applauded and supported by the other javelin throwers, however, all of whom were aware of the reasons for his participation in that event.

Sola, though not a spectacular javelin thrower, is more than capable in his own sports. He won gold at the 2004 Oceania Athletics Championships in both discus (with a games record of 53.79m) and shot put (17.86m), and represented Samoa in the discus at the 2004 Olympic Games.

In 2005, Sola competed in the South Pacific Mini Games for the first time, winning two medals - one gold and one silver. He first competed in the shot put, throwing 17.74 metres and winning his medal of the games. Sola then competed in the discus and came second place with a throw of 49.33.

== Personal bests ==
Event	Result	Venue	Date
Shot put	18.12 m	(New Zealand) Wellington	8 Mar 2003
Discus throw	58.82 m	(New Zealand) Wellington	12 Feb 2005
Hammer throw	44.34 m	(Fiji) Suva	9 Jul 2003
Javelin throw	41.18 m	(Finland) Helsinki	9 Aug 2005

== Achievements ==
Year	Competition	Venue	Position	Event	Notes
Representing Samoa
1996	Oceania Junior Championships	Townsville, Australia	4th	Shot put	14.20m
1996	Oceania Junior Championships	Townsville, Australia	3rd	Discus	48.04 m
2003	South Pacific Games	Suva, Fiji	2nd	Shot put	15.97 m
2003	South Pacific Games	Suva, Fiji	1st	Discus	50.46 m
2003	South Pacific Games	Suva, Fiji	4th	Hammer	44.34m
2004	Oceania Championships	Townsville, Australia	1st	Shot put	17.86 m CR
2004	Oceania Championships	Townsville, Australia	1st	Discus	53.79 m CR
2004	Oceania Championships	Townsville, Australia	3rd	Hammer	45.94 m
2004	Olympic Games	Athens, Greece	36th (q)	Discus	51.10m
2005	South Pacific Mini Games	Koror, Palau	1st	Shot put	17.74 m
2005	South Pacific Mini Games	Koror, Palau	2nd	Discus	49.33 m
2005	South Pacific Mini Games	Koror, Palau	4th	Hammer	40.82m
2005	World Championships	Helsinki, Finland	31st (q)	Javelin	41.18m
2006	Commonwealth Games	Melbourne, Australia	10th	Shot put	16.47m
2006	Commonwealth Games	Melbourne, Australia	12th	Discus	47.74m
2007	Pacific Games	Apia, Samoa	1st	Shot put	16.77 m
2007	Pacific Games	Apia, Samoa	2nd	Discus	48.73 m
2009	Polynesian Championships	Gold Coast, Queensland, Australia	1st	Shot put	16.19m
2009	Polynesian Championships	Gold Coast, Queensland, Australia	2nd	Discus	45.14m
2009	Pacific Mini Games	Rarotonga, Cook Islands	2nd	Shot put	16.16 m
2009	Pacific Mini Games	Rarotonga, Cook Islands	6th	Discus	42.70m
2011	Oceania Championships (Regional Division East)	Apia, Samoa	2nd	Shot put	15.29 m
2011	Oceania Championships (Regional Division East)	Apia, Samoa	1st	Discus	43.10 m
2011	Oceania Championships (Regional Division East)	Apia, Samoa	2nd	Hammer	36.04 m
2011	Pacific Games	Nouméa, New Caledonia	3rd	Shot put	16.17 m
2011	Pacific Games	Nouméa, New Caledonia	6th	Discus	43.01m
2014	Oceania Championships	Rarotonga, Cook Islands	4th	Shot put	14.90m
2014	Oceania Championships	Rarotonga, Cook Islands	4th	Discus	40.01m
2014	Oceania Championships	Rarotonga, Cook Islands	3rd	Hammer	34.23m
2014	Oceania Masters Championships (35y-39y)	Rarotonga, Cook Islands	1st	Shot put	15.04m
2014	Oceania Masters Championships (35y-39y)	Rarotonga, Cook Islands	1st	Discus	40.07m
