= 2000 Polynesian Championships in Athletics =

I Polynesian Championships in Athletics
- Host city: Apia, Samoa
- Level: Senior
- Events: 32 (18 men, 14 women)

The 2000 Polynesian Championships in Athletics took place in 2000. The event was held in Apia, Samoa.

A total of 32 events were contested, 18 by men and 14 by women.

== Medal summary ==
Medal winners and their results were published on the Athletics Weekly webpage.

=== Men ===
Event	First		Second		Third	
100 metres	Kelsey Nakanelua; American Samoa	10.9	Misili Manu; Samoa	10.9	Aleki Toetu'u Sapoi; Tonga	11.2
200 metres	Misili Manu; Samoa	21.68	Kelsey Nakanelua; American Samoa	21.76	Ron Fanuatanu; Samoa	22.55
400 metres	Kelsey Nakanelua; American Samoa	49.60	Ualesi Faatauvaa; Samoa	51.50	Anesi Faaloia; Samoa	51.56
800 metres	Niue Titi; Samoa	2:00.3	Gatai Ipou; Samoa	2:01.6	Setefano Mika; Samoa	2:03.6
1500 metres	Setefano Mika; Samoa	4:28.3	Niue Titi; Samoa	4:28.4	Olivier Huc; French Polynesia	4:30.1
3000 metres	Olivier Huc; French Polynesia	8:14.3	Setefano Mika; Samoa	8:22.8	Satini Tyrell; Samoa	8:24.1
110 metres hurdles	Aleki Toetu'u Sapoi; Tonga	15.76	Salafai Tasi; Samoa	16.08	Sesi Salt; Tonga	16.18
400 metres hurdles	Aleki Toetu'u Sapoi; Tonga	54.92	Ualesi Faatauvaa; Samoa	55.86	Kuripitone Betham; Samoa	56.19
High jump	Sebastian Latu; Samoa	1.75m	Tamiano Isitolo; Samoa	1.75m	Jessie Ailuai; Samoa	1.75m
Pole vault	Tokaikolo Latapu; Tonga	3.50m	Tamiano Isitolo; Samoa	2.90m	Benetti Schwalger; Samoa	2.70m
Long jump	Tokaikolo Latapu; Tonga	6.94m	Patrick Fonoti; Samoa	6.85m	Benetti Schwalger; Samoa	6.74m
Triple jump	Fagamanu Sofai; Samoa	14.44m	Chris ?. Samoa	13.56m	Tamiano Isitolo; Samoa	13.16m
Shot put	Gilles Valdenaire; French Polynesia	12.64m	Etuale Luamanu; Samoa	12.40m	Taumaa Heifara; French Polynesia	12.36m
Discus throw	Gilles Valdenaire; French Polynesia	40.82m	Taumaa Heifara; French Polynesia	39.68m	Motekiai Taufalatu; Tonga	36.74m
Hammer throw	Gary Tuiletufuga; Samoa	39.88m	Motekiai Taufalatu; Tonga	28.28m	Etuale Luamanu; Samoa	20.94m
Javelin throw	Etuale Luamanu; Samoa	51.92m	Fito Scanlan; Samoa	49.20m	Nevo Faafea; Samoa	48.66m
4 x 100 metres relay	Samoa A	42.72	Tonga	43.79	Samoa B	44.39
4 x 400 metres relay	Samoa A	3:26.6	Samoa B	3:30.?	Samoa C	3:31.9

=== Women ===
Event	First		Second		Third	
100 metres	Sikuvea Latai; Tonga	12.8	Elysa Williams; Cook Islands	13.2	Talava Pei; Samoa	13.8
200 metres	Sikuvea Latai; Tonga	25.75	Elysa Williams; Cook Islands	27.12	New Year Ioane; Samoa	27.59
400 metres	Sikuvea Latai; Tonga	63.28	New Year Ioane; Samoa	64.07	Talava Pei; Samoa	64.26
800 metres	Vaite Bounhoure; French Polynesia	2:24.3	Savali Luani; Samoa	2:41.3	Taimoana Iese; Samoa	2:42.3
1500 metres	Vaite Bounhoure; French Polynesia	5:13.8	Savali Luani; Samoa	5:55.5	Shela Fainuu; Samoa	5:56.0
100 metres hurdles	Marilyn W. Samoa	18.10	Diana T. Samoa	18.31	Carol Apelu; Samoa	18.32
High jump	Louola Fiu; Samoa	1.48m	Toefuataina F. Samoa	1.42m	Faleulu Tuli; Samoa	1.35m
Long jump	Loretta A. Samoa	4.68m	Louola Fiu; Samoa	4.30m	Nele S. Samoa	4.22m
Triple jump	Faleulu Tuli; Samoa	9.74m	Sose Tavae; Samoa	9.64m	Loretta A. Samoa	9.60m
Shot put	Ana Po'uhila; Tonga	13.88m	Melehifo Uhi; Tonga	12.92m	Tereapii Tapoki; Cook Islands	12.36m
Discus throw	Melehifo Uhi; Tonga	44.82m	Tereapii Tapoki; Cook Islands	40.38m	Siniva Marsters; Cook Islands	36.46m
Hammer throw	Siniva Marsters; Cook Islands	38.10m	Melehifo Uhi; Tonga	37.40m	Ana Po'uhila; Tonga	29.68m
Javelin throw	Iloai Suaniu; Samoa	40.86m	Ana Po'uhila; Tonga	40.84m	Benyon Natanielu; Samoa	38.10m
4 x 100 metres relay	Samoa A	53.16	Samoa B	53.68	Samoa C	54.34

== Medal table (unofficial) ==
* Host nation (Samoa)

Rank	Nation	Gold	Silver	Bronze	Total
1	Samoa (SAM)*	15	20	21	56
2	Tonga (TON)	9	5	4	18
3	French Polynesia (TAH)	5	1	2	8
4	American Samoa (ASA)	2	1	0	3
5	Cook Islands (COK)	1	3	2	6
Totals (5 entries)		32	30	29	91
