= Jay Stone (athlete) =

Australian sprinter

Medal record

Athletics

Representing Australia

Oceania Athletics Championships (Open)
Silver medal – second place	2006 Apia	Long Jump
Silver medal – second place	2008 Saipan	Long Jump
Bronze medal – third place	2008 Saipan	200 m
Bronze medal – third place	2008 Saipan	4 × 100 m Relay
Bronze medal – third place	2010 Cairns	4 × 100 m Relay
Bronze medal – third place	2010 Cairns	Mixed Medley Relay
Bronze medal – third place	2017 Suva	Mixed Medley Relay
Silver medal – second place	2019 Townsville	Mixed 4 × 400 m Relay

World Masters Athletics Championships (M35)
Bronze medal – third place	2016 Perth	400 m
Gold medal – first place	2017 Daegu	200 m
Gold medal – first place	2017 Daegu	400 m
Silver medal – second place	2019 Toruń	4 × 200 m Relay
Bronze medal – third place	2019 Toruń	400 m

Jay Stone (born 31 December 1979) is a track and field sprint athlete who competes as a Masters athlete for Australia.

At age 39 Stone was part of the M35 Australian 4 × 200 m relay team that set a new national open indoor record.

Stone is also a successful athletics coach.
