= 2007 Micronesian Championships in Athletics =

III Micronesian Championships in Athletics
- Dates: December 14–15
- Host city: Mannengon Hills, Yona, Guam
- Venue: Leo Palace Resort
- Level: Senior
- Events: 42 (20 men, 19 women, 1 mixed, 1 boys, 1 girls)
- Participation: 103 athletes from 7 nations

The 2007 Micronesian Championships in Athletics took place between December 14–15, 2007. The event was held at the Leo Palace Resort in Mannengon Hills, Yona, Guam. Detailed reports were given for the OAA.

A total of 42 events were contested, 20 by men, 19 by women, 1 mixed, 1 by boys, and 1 by girls.

== Medal summary ==
Complete results can be found on the Oceania Athletics Association webpage.

=== Men ===
Event	Gold		Silver		Bronze	
60 metres	John Howard; Federated States of Micronesia	7.02	Jack Howard; Federated States of Micronesia	7.09	JJ Capelle; Nauru	7.12
100 metres	Jack Howard; Federated States of Micronesia	11.21	John Howard; Federated States of Micronesia	11.05	Tyrone Omar; Northern Mariana Islands	11.36
200 metres	John Howard; Federated States of Micronesia	23.05	Jack Howard; Federated States of Micronesia	23.24	Tyrone Omar; Northern Mariana Islands	23.41
400 metres	JJ Capelle; Nauru	52.30	Tearoba Takeruru; Kiribati	52.73	Christopher Kenty; Palau	53.44
800 metres	Douglas Schmidt Jr; Palau	2:04.74	Matt Pangelinan; Guam	2:08.07	Jeofry Limtiaco; Guam	2:10.08
1500 metres	Douglas Schmidt Jr; Palau	4:30.74	Matt Pangelinan; Guam	4:30.92	Christopher Magtoto; Guam	4:34.32
3000 metres	Douglas Schmidt Jr; Palau; Christopher Magtoto; Guam	9:52.35			Matt Pangelinan; Guam	10:03.88
110 metres hurdles	Beteru Ateri; Kiribati	17.82	Jahlil Fielder; Guam	17.93	Malenkov Towai; Guam	18.74
400 metres hurdles	Christopher Kenty; Palau	1:00.76	Beteru Ateri; Kiribati	1:02.05	Jahlil Fielder; Guam	1:02.87
High jump	Buraieta Yeeting; Kiribati	1.79m	Deamo Baguga; Nauru	1.77m	Beteru Ateri; Kiribati	1.75m
Long jump	Rabangaki Nawai; Kiribati	6.62m CR	Buraieta Yeeting; Kiribati	6.35m	Deamo Baguga; Nauru	6.33m
Triple jump	Buraieta Yeeting; Kiribati	13.04m	Deamo Baguga; Nauru	12.54m	Salomon Coldman; Federated States of Micronesia	11.79m
Shot put	A-One Tannang; Nauru	13.14m	Rabangaki Nawai; Kiribati	11.33m	Nick Gross; Northern Mariana Islands	10.36m
Discus throw	Rabangaki Nawai; Kiribati	35.72m	Sylvan Rangamar; Northern Mariana Islands	33.39m	Tom Aguon; Guam	31.16m
Hammer throw	Erick Taitano; Guam	32.66m	Ernie Dumapias; Guam	27.64m	Arjay Valencia; Guam	19.72m
Javelin throw	Nick Gross; Northern Mariana Islands	54.00m	Rabangaki Nawai; Kiribati	49.04m	Albert Juan; Guam	45.36m
Octathlon	Leon Mengloi; Palau	3952	Tom Aguon; Guam	2882	Rick Lizama; Guam	2807
6 km Cross Country	Christopher Magtoto; Guam	20:51.62	Alan Periera; Guam	20:53.16	Matt Pangelinan; Guam	21:37.80
4 x 100 metres relay	Kiribati; Tearoba Takeruru; Tanroo Taniera; Rabangaki Nawai; Ieie Matang	44.14	Federated States of Micronesia; Jack Howard; John Howard; Yondan Namelo; Dickson Maipi	44.27	Guam; Jeric Abisia; Frank Aguon; Jahlil Fielder; Jan Vallarta	46.06
4 x 400 metres relay	Kiribati	3:38.11	Palau; Christopher Kenty; Douglas Schmidt Jr; Leon Mengloi; Amaroy Marino	3:38.58	Federated States of Micronesia; D'Shaun Stallings; Joseph Artui; Jack Howard; John Howard	3:46.87

=== Women ===
Event	Gold		Silver		Bronze	
60 metres	Toni Villaflores; Guam	7.89	Felicia Saburo; Palau	8.00	Pollara Cobb; Guam	8.07
100 metres	Rosa-Mystique Jone; Nauru	12.90 =CR	Felicia Saburo; Palau	13.08	Dana Thoma; Nauru	13.31
200 metres	Felicia Saburo; Palau	27.23	Rosa-Mystique Jone; Nauru	27.50	Yvonne Bennet; Northern Mariana Islands	27.95
400 metres	Jacque Wonenberg; Northern Mariana Islands	1:03.71	Cyandel Williams; Palau	1:07.24	Kimberly Layson; Guam	1:08.80
800 metres	Leanna Peters; Guam	2:35.85	Nicole Layson; Guam	2:35.99	Charelle Williams; Palau	2:51.04
1500 metres	Leanna Peters; Guam	5:26.53	Nicole Layson; Guam	5:33.70	Charelle Williams; Palau	5:50.95
3000 metres	Leanna Peters; Guam	12:05.42	Nicole Layson; Guam	12:28.72	Morgan Avery; Guam	12:56.50
100 metres hurdles	Lourdes Redilla; Guam	19.15	Mary Mantanona; Guam	19.19	Noreen Martinez; Guam	19.93
400 metres hurdles	Noreen Martinez; Guam	1:15.65	Alyssa Posadas; Guam	1:26.31	Mary Mantanona; Guam	1:27.92
High jump	Lourdes Redilla; Guam	1.29m	Mary Mantanona; Guam	1.23m		
Long jump	Jacque Wonenberg; Northern Mariana Islands	4.47m	Pollara Cobb; Guam	4.11m	Alyssa Posadas; Guam	4.05m
Triple jump	Alyssa Posadas; Guam	9.02m CR	Zyra Garcia; Guam	8.66m	Caitlin Mesias; Guam	7.96m
Shot put	Maleah Umerang Tangadik; Palau	9.69m	Genie Gerardo; Guam	9.42m	Corrine Hideos; Palau	9.35m
Discus throw	Maleah Umerang Tangadik; Palau	30.65m CR	Genie Gerardo; Guam	29.94m	Jerusha Mau; Nauru	28.88m
Hammer throw	Genie Gerardo; Guam	29.62m CR	Corrine Hideos; Palau	25.94m	Aiko Imbat; Guam	24.88m
Javelin throw	Maleah Umerang Tangadik; Palau	38.57m CR	Irish Iriarte; Guam	29.52m	Aiko Imbat; Guam	27.57m
3 km Cross Country	Leanna Peters; Guam	11:31.33	Nicole Layson; Guam	11:43.34	Morgan Avery; Guam	12:24.69
4 x 100 metres relay	Guam; Cora Alicto; Noreen Martinez; Pollara Cobb; Mary Mantanona	53.95	Palau; Cyandel Williams; Charelle Williams; Felicia Saburo; Diliaur Kumaichi	55.35	Northern Mariana Islands	56.59
4 x 400 metres relay	Guam} Leanna Peters; Noreen Martinez; Nicole Layson; Kimberly Layson	4:34.72 CR	Northern Mariana Islands	4:42.42		

=== Mixed ===
Event	Gold		Silver		Bronze	
800 metres Medley relay	Nauru; Dana Thoma; Deamo Baguga; Rosa-Mystique Jone; JJ Capelle	1:44.05	Palau; Cyandel Williams; Leevin Manuel; Felicia Saburo; Christopher Kenty	1:47.28	Northern Mariana Islands; Yvonne Bennet; Tyrone Omar; Jacque Wonenberg; Nathanial Mateo	1:50.37

=== Boys ===
Event	Gold		Silver		Bronze	
60 metres	Leevin Manuel; Palau	7.67	Desebel Koshiba; Palau	7.67	Cynric Kebekol; Palau	7.93

=== Girls ===
Event	Gold		Silver		Bronze	
60 metres	Cyandel Williams; Palau	8.73	Lilihna Mihkel; Federated States of Micronesia	8.91	Reylynn Sapong; Northern Mariana Islands	9.80

== Medal table (unofficial) ==
The published medal count contains the results of the 60 metres sprints elsewhere dubbed as "invitational," but not the mixed medley relay, explaining the difference to the unofficial count below.

* Host nation (Guam)

Rank	Nation	Gold	Silver	Bronze	Total
1	Guam (GUM)*	15	18	21	54
2	Palau (PLW)	11	8	5	24
3	Kiribati (KIR)	7	5	1	13
4	Nauru (NRU)	4	3	4	11
5	Federated States of Micronesia (FSM)	3	5	3	11
6	Northern Mariana Islands (NMI)	3	2	7	12
Totals (6 entries)		43	41	41	125

^{†}: Including medley relay medal.

== Participation ==
According to an unofficial count, 103 athletes from 7 countries participated.

- Guam (48)
- Kiribati (6)
- Marshall Islands (2)
- Federated States of Micronesia (12)
- Nauru (7)
- Northern Mariana Islands (11)
- Palau (17)
