= 2009 Polynesian Championships in Athletics =

IV Polynesian Championships in Athletics
- Dates: August 4–8
- Host city: Gold Coast, Queensland, Australia
- Venue: Griffith University
- Level: Senior
- Events: 32 (18 men, 14 women)
- Participation: 53 athletes from 8 nations

The 2009 Polynesian Championships in Athletics took place between August 4–8, 2009. The event was held at the Griffith University in Gold Coast, Queensland, Australia, jointly with the OAA Grand Prix Series, and the OAA sub-regional Melanesian and Micronesian Championships. Many athletes utilised the competitions preparing for the upcoming IAAF World Championships in Berlin, Germany. Detailed reports were given for the OAA.

A total of 32 events were contested, 18 by men and 14 by women.

== Medal summary ==
Complete results can be found on the Oceania Athletics Association webpage, and at sportfieber.pytalhost.com.

In 100 metres, long jump and triple jump, as well as in shot put, discus throw, and javelin throw, there were separate open competitions for the Polynesian championships and the OAA Grand Prix Series held on different days.

=== Men ===
Event	Gold		Silver		Bronze	
100 metres (wind: -0.8 m/s)	Clayton Mbofana; New Zealand	10.82 CR	Lagaua Patuavalu; Niue	11.04	Aisea Tohi; Tonga	11.28
100 metres Non-Championship Event (Grand Prix Series)	Tiraa Arere; Cook Islands	11.52 (wind: +0.0 m/s)	Michael Jackson Jnr; Niue	11.93 (wind: +1.2 m/s)	Harry Ivaiti; Cook Islands	11.93 (wind: +0.0 m/s)
200 metres (wind: +0.7 m/s)	Clayton Mbofana; New Zealand	22.03	Scott Burch; New Zealand	22.50	Lagaua Patuavalu; Niue	22.67
400 metres	Scott Burch; New Zealand	50.36	Jocelyn Muntaner; French Polynesia	51.00		
800 metres	Michael Whitehead; New Zealand	1:55.79 CR	Iulio Lafai; Samoa	2:04.10		
1500 metres	Michael Whitehead; New Zealand	4:07.61 CR	Pierre Bourret; French Polynesia	4:20.98		
5000 metres	Francky Maraetaata; French Polynesia	16:24.66 CR				
10000 metres	Francky Maraetaata; French Polynesia	34:06.17				
3000 metres steeplechase	Pierre Bourret; French Polynesia	10:40.22				
110 metres hurdles (wind: -1.0 m/s)	Toriki Urarii; French Polynesia	15.03	Paseka Fangupo; Tonga	15.47	Michael Cochrane; New Zealand	15.47
400 metres hurdles	Michael Cochrane; New Zealand	56.16	Paseka Fangupo; Tonga	56.56	Inoke Finau; Tonga	60.04
High jump	Regan Standing; New Zealand	1.96m CR	Raihau Maiau; French Polynesia	1.87m	Esau Vakameilalo; Tonga	1.81m
Long jump	Raihau Maiau; French Polynesia	6.73m (wind: +1.4 m/s)	Okilani Tinilau; Tuvalu	6.62m w (wind: +3.3 m/s)	Michael Cochrane; New Zealand	5.91m (wind: +1.7 m/s)
Long jump Non-Championship Event (Grand Prix Series)	Okilani Tinilau; Tuvalu	6.36m (wind: -0.3 m/s)	Tiraa Arere; Cook Islands	6.05m (wind: +2.0 m/s)	David Pi; Cook Islands	4.50m (wind: -0.3 m/s)
Triple jump	Raihau Maiau; French Polynesia	13.76m (wind: -0.9 m/s)	Esau Vakameilalo; Tonga	11.97m (wind: -0.8 m/s)	Tiraa Arere; Cook Islands	11.49m (wind: +0.0 m/s)
Triple jump Non-Championship Event (Grand Prix Series)	Tiraa Arere; Cook Islands	12.68m (wind: -0.1 m/s)	David Pi; Cook Islands	10.29m (wind: -0.7 m/s)		
Shot put	Shaka Sola; Samoa	16.19m	Henry Satupai; Samoa	12.98m	Jeffrey Kalemani; Tonga	12.77m
Shot put Non-Championship Event (Grand Prix Series)	Shaka Sola; Samoa	16.18m	Henry Satupai; Samoa	12.79m		
Discus throw	Marshall Hall; New Zealand	45.47m	Shaka Sola; Samoa	45.14m	Henry Satupai; Samoa	39.10m
Discus throw Non-Championship Event (Grand Prix Series)	Henry Satupai; Samoa	39.39m				
Javelin throw	Vaihau Bottari; French Polynesia	52.87m	Toriki Urarii; French Polynesia	49.14m		
Javelin throw Non-Championship Event (Grand Prix Series)	Vaihau Bottari; French Polynesia	54.18m	Toriki Urarii; French Polynesia	50.62m		
4 x 100 metres relay	Tonga	43.28	New Zealand	43.64	Niue	44.51
4 x 400 metres relay	New Zealand	3:29.62	Tonga	3:29.88		

=== Women ===
Event	Gold		Silver		Bronze	
100 metres (wind: -1.0 m/s)	Latai Sikuvea; Tonga	12.74	Patiola Pahulu; Tonga	13.24	Patricia Taea; Cook Islands	13.31
100 metres Non-Championship Event (Grand Prix Series)	Maki Samantha Lockington; Cook Islands	13.58 (wind: +1.0 m/s)				
200 metres (wind: +3.5 m/s)	Latai Sikuvea; Tonga	25.67 w	Rebecca Gibson; New Zealand	26.08 w	Patiola Pahulu; Tonga	26.50 w
400 metres	Rebecca Gibson; New Zealand	59.20 CR	Océane Lefranc; French Polynesia	60.96		
100 metres hurdles (wind: -0.3 m/s)	Terani Faremiro; French Polynesia	15.04 CR	Johanna Sui; French Polynesia	15.27		
400 metres hurdles	Mele To'a; Tonga	71.53				
High jump	Johanna Sui; French Polynesia	1.64m CR	Terani Faremiro; French Polynesia	1.64m	Océane Lefranc; French Polynesia	1.50m
Long jump	Terani Faremiro; French Polynesia	5.47m w (wind: +2.9 m/s)	Kalina Mama'o; Tonga	5.35m w (wind: +3.7 m/s)	Patricia Taea; Cook Islands	5.09m w (wind: +5.1 m/s)
Triple jump	Terani Faremiro; French Polynesia	11.08m (wind: +0.8 m/s) CR	Kalina Mama'o; Tonga	10.78m (wind: -1.0 m/s)		
Shot put	Margaret Satupai; Samoa	13.92m CR	Kaati Malua; Tonga	11.47m	Inara Lista Sioni; Tuvalu	9.65m
Shot put Non-Championship Event (Grand Prix Series)	Margaret Satupai; Samoa	14.39m	Inara Lista Sioni; Tuvalu	9.42m		
Discus throw	Margaret Satupai; Samoa	45.69m CR	Patsy Akeli; Samoa	38.56m	Kaati Malua; Tonga	29.07m
Discus throw Non-Championship Event (Grand Prix Series)	Margaret Satupai; Samoa	44.13m				
Hammer throw	Siniva Marsters; Cook Islands	38.93m CR	Margaret Satupai; Samoa	37.91m		
Javelin throw	Patsy Akeli; Samoa	51.54m CR	Johanna Sui; French Polynesia	42.86m	Maki Samantha Lockington; Cook Islands	39.28m
Javelin throw Non-Championship Event (Grand Prix Series)	Patsy Akeli; Samoa	50.03m				
4 x 100 metres relay	Tonga	49.87 CR	French Polynesia	51.94		
4 x 400 metres relay	Tonga	4:29.27				

== Medal table (unofficial) ==
Rank	Nation	Gold	Silver	Bronze	Total
1	French Polynesia (PYF)	11	9	1	21
2	New Zealand (NZL)	10	3	2	15
3	Tonga (TON)	6	8	6	20
4	Samoa (SAM)	4	5	1	10
5	Cook Islands (COK)	1	0	4	5
6	Niue (NIU)	0	1	2	3
7	Tuvalu (TUV)	0	1	1	2
Totals (7 entries)		32	27	17	76

== Participation ==
According to an unofficial count, 53 athletes from 8 countries participated.

- American Samoa (1)
- Cook Islands (10)
- French Polynesia (10)
- New Zealand (7)
- Niue (4)
- Samoa (5)
- Tonga (12)
- Tuvalu (4)
