= 2008 Oceania Athletics Championships =

9th Oceania Athletics Championships
- Dates: June 25–28
- Host city: Saipan, Northern Mariana Islands
- Venue: Oleai Sports Complex
- Level: Open senior, U18
- Type: Outdoor
- Events: 84 (21 men, 21 women for 2 age categories)
- Participation: 23 nations

The 2008 Oceania Athletics Championships was the 9th edition of the Oceania Athletics Championships, organised under the supervision of the Oceania Athletic Association, in Saipan, Northern Mariana Islands in June. Athletes competed at two age categories: Youth (U18) and open senior. New Caledonia competed as part of Oceania for the first time, having competed as a guest nation in past events. The four-day competition took place from 25 to 28 June

== Medal table ==
* Host nation (Host)

| Rank | Nation | Gold | Silver | Bronze | Total |
|---|---|---|---|---|---|
| 1 | Fiji | 9 | 9 | 3 | 21 |
| 2 | Papua New Guinea | 9 | 5 | 4 | 18 |
| 3 | Australia | 6 | 3 | 4 | 13 |
| 4 | Samoa | 5 | 3 | 1 | 9 |
| 5 | New Caledonia | 3 | 2 | 2 | 7 |
| 6 | French Polynesia | 2 | 5 | 3 | 10 |
| 7 | Guam | 2 | 4 | 4 | 10 |
| 8 | Cook Islands | 1 | 1 | 2 | 4 |
| 9 | Kiribati | 1 | 1 | 1 | 3 |
| 10 | Norfolk Island | 1 | 0 | 0 | 1 |
| 11 | Tonga | 0 | 2 | 3 | 5 |
| 12 | Northern Mariana Islands* | 0 | 2 | 2 | 4 |
| 13 | Solomon Islands | 0 | 0 | 2 | 2 |
| 14 | Nauru | 0 | 0 | 1 | 1 |
| 14 | Vanuatu | 0 | 0 | 1 | 1 |
| Totals (15 entries) | | 39 | 37 | 33 | 109 |

== Medal summary ==
The results were published.

=== Men ===
| Event | Gold | | Silver | | Bronze | |
|---|---|---|---|---|---|---|
| 100 m (wind: -1.0 m/s) | Iowane Dovumatua; Fiji | 10.92 | Setareki Tikosaya; Fiji | 10.99 | Jack Iroga; Solomon Islands | 11.07 |
| 200 m (wind: -0.9 m/s) | Isoa Me; Fiji | 21.93 | Setareki Tikosaya; Fiji | 22.02 | Jay Stone; Australia | 22.08 |
| 400 m | Joshua Ahwong; Australia | 48.26 | Aporosa Tabulawaki; Fiji | 48.67 | Isoa Me; Fiji | 48.75 |
| 800 m | Aunese Curreen; Samoa | 1:51.16 | Isireli Naikelekelevesi; Fiji | 1:53.48 | Aporosa Tabulawaki; Fiji | 1:57.41 |
| 1500 m | Aunese Curreen; Samoa | 3:58.76 | Isireli Naikelekelevesi; Fiji | 4:03.79 | Derek Mandell; Guam | 4:05.79 |
| 5000 m | Brendan Whelan; Australia | 16:02.19 | Tupuhoe Tahi; French Polynesia | 16:12.54 | Teiva Izal; French Polynesia | 16:13.00 |
| 110 m hurdles (wind: -0.7 m/s) | Toriki Urarii; French Polynesia | 15.11 | Kenneth Karosich; Guam | 15.50 | Inoke Finau; Tonga | 15.54 |
| 400 m hurdles | Mowen Boino; Papua New Guinea | 52.07 | Jone Wainiqolo; Fiji | 55.79 | Kenneth Karosich; Guam | 57.02 |
| 3000 m steeplechase | Tim Rogers; Norfolk Island | 12:18.36 | Ketson Kabiriel; Northern Mariana Islands | 12:20.07 | | |
| 4 × 100 m | Fiji; Iowane Dovumatua; Setareki Tikosaya; Frank Louey; Isoa Me | 42.01 | Papua New Guinea; Reginald Worealevi; Kupun Wisil; Waname Egora; Joe Matmat | 42.71 | Australia; Jay Stone; Duane Daley; Joshua Ahwong; Peter Tuccandidgee | 42.84 |
| High jump | David Birati; Kiribati | 1.92 | Emori Sabua; Fiji | 1.86 | Kristopher Williamson; Cook Islands | 1.83 |
| Long jump | /Frédéric Erin; New Caledonia | 7.59 (wind: +0.0 m/s) | Jay Stone; Australia | 7.10 (wind: -0.7 m/s) | Sandy Katusele; Papua New Guinea | 6.98 (wind: +0.7 m/s) |
| Triple jump | Frank Louey; Fiji | 14.23 (wind: +0.1 m/s) | /Kainric Ozoux; New Caledonia | 14.05 (wind: +1.3 m/s) | Sandy Katusele; Papua New Guinea | 13.99 (wind: +0.9 m/s) |
| Shot put | /Daniel Kilama; New Caledonia | 16.76 | Stephen Lasei; Samoa | 14.44 | /Mathieu Roulet; New Caledonia | 13.68 |
| Discus throw | /Daniel Kilama; New Caledonia | 48.06 | Rooarii Pito; French Polynesia | 47.51 | /Yann Fuluhea; New Caledonia | 45.04 |
| Hammer throw | Thomas McGuire; Australia | 46.00 | Rooarii Pito; French Polynesia | 41.90 | | |
| Javelin throw | Leslie Copeland; Fiji | 67.02 | /Mathieu Roulet; New Caledonia | 66.08 | Nick Gross; Northern Mariana Islands | 52.43 |
| Octathlon | Brendan Peeters; Australia | 4927 | Rabangaki Nawai; Kiribati | 4901 | Toriki Urarii; French Polynesia | 4827 |
| 6 km Cross Country | Aunese Curreen; Samoa | 21:05 | Brendan Whelan; Australia | 21:09 | Lavi Sam; Vanuatu | 21:14 |
| Half Marathon | Tutea Degage; French Polynesia | 1:17:38.67 | Teiva Izal; French Polynesia | 1:19:58.75 | Brendan Whelan; Australia | 1:24:27.83 |

=== Women ===
| Event | Gold | | Silver | | Bronze | |
|---|---|---|---|---|---|---|
| 100 m (wind: -1.2 m/s) | Mae Koime; Papua New Guinea | 11.66 CR | Toea Wisil; Papua New Guinea | 11.94 | Makelesi Tumalevu; Fiji | 12.39 |
| 200 m (wind: -2.1 m/s) | Mae Koime; Papua New Guinea | 24.11 | Toea Wisil; Papua New Guinea | 24.45 | Betty Burua; Papua New Guinea | 25.05 |
| 400 m | Salome Dell; Papua New Guinea | 55.45 | Betty Burua; Papua New Guinea | 55.80 | Sharon Henry; Papua New Guinea | 58.00 |
| 800 m | Salome Dell; Papua New Guinea | 2:10.92 | Salote Mereula; Fiji | 2:21.80 | Nicole Layson; Guam | 2:39.63 |
| 1500 m | Salome Dell; Papua New Guinea | 4:40.39 | Nicole Layson; Guam | 5:25.92 | Malia’Aneta Patolo; Tonga | 5:45.27 |
| 5000 m | Nicole Layson; Guam | 21:11.76 | Malia’Aneta Patolo; Tonga | 23:25.96 | Luna Tuifutana; Tonga | 25:17.43 |
| 100 m hurdles (wind: -1.0 m/s) | Milika Tuivanuavou; Fiji | 16.22 | Monique Lafaialii; Samoa | 16.34 | | |
| 400 m hurdles | Sharon Henry; Papua New Guinea | 61.83 | Lata Tuifutuna; Tonga | 71.07 | Kaitinano Mwemweata; Kiribati | 81.71 |
| 4 × 100 m | Papua New Guinea; Sharon Henry; Mae Koime; Betty Burua; Toea Wisil | 47.27 | Fiji; Makelesi Tumalevu; Paulini Korowaqa; Salote Mereula; Milika Tuivanuavou | 49.24 | Australia; Emma-Rose Daby; Sarah Busby; Emily Keehn; Narelle Long | 49.92 |
| Long jump | Makelesi Tumalevu; Fiji | 5.70 (wind: +0.1 m/s) | Maki Samanth Lockington; Cook Islands | 5.07 (wind: +0.7 m/s) | | |
| Triple jump | Monique Lafaialii; Samoa | 10.20 (wind: +1.3 m/s) | | | | |
| Shot put | Margaret Satupai; Samoa | 13.94 | Genie Gierardo; Guam | 9.79 | Nina Grundler; Nauru | 9.66 |
| Discus throw | Tereapii Tapoki; Cook Islands | 50.59 | Margaret Satupai; Samoa | 46.57 | Perle Buard; French Polynesia | 30.82 |
| Hammer throw | Kelly Humphries; Australia | 45.57 | Olivia Birkett; Australia | 38.33 | Margaret Satupai; Samoa | 36.11 |
| Javelin throw | Milika Tuivanuavou; Fiji | 39.36 | Perle Buard; French Polynesia | 39.02 | Maki Samanth Lockington; Cook Islands | 32.70 |
| Heptathlon | Narelle Long; Australia | 3081 | | | | |
| 3 km Cross Country | Salome Dell; Papua New Guinea | 11:08 | Marie Benito; Guam | 12:20 | Nicole Layson; Guam | 12:31 |
| Half Marathon | Marie Benito; Guam | 1:35:20.83 | Mieko Carey; Northern Mariana Islands | 1:39:32.28 | Mamiko Oshima; Northern Mariana Islands | 1:42:26.67 |

=== Mixed ===
| Event | Gold | | Silver | | Bronze | |
|---|---|---|---|---|---|---|
| 800 metres Medley relay | Fiji; Makelesi Tumalevu; Iowane Dovumatua; Paulini Korowaqa; Aporosa Tabulawaki | 1:38.29 | Papua New Guinea; Shirley Vunatup; Waname Egora; Betty Burua; Kevin Kapmatana | 1:39.50 | Solomon Islands; Pauline Kwalea; Jack Iroga; Flory Liza; Emmanuel Tautaumea | 1:41.26 |
