= Ruby Joy Gabriel =

Palauan sprinter

Personal information
- Born: 22 November 1994 (age 31) Koror, Palau
- Height: 1.57 m (5 ft 2 in)
- Weight: 52 kg (115 lb)

Sport
- Country: Palau
- Sport: Athletics
- Event: 100 metres
Medal record
Women's athletics
Representing Palau
Micronesian Games
Silver medal – second place	2010 Koror	400 m hurdles
Bronze medal – third place	2010 Koror	4x100 m relay
- Updated on 7 May 2013

Ruby Joy Gabriel (born 22 November 1994) is a Palauan female sprinter who competed in the 100 metres event at the 2012 Summer Olympics.

== Achievements ==
Year	Competition	Venue	Position	Event	Notes
Representing Palau
2010	Micronesian Games	Koror, Palau	3rd	400 m hurdles	76.91 s
2010	Micronesian Games	Koror, Palau	2nd	4 × 100 m relay	54.56 s
