= 2004 Oceania Athletics Championships =

VII Oceania Athletics Championships
- Dates: December 16–18
- Host city: Townsville, Queensland, Australia
- Venue: Townsville Sports Reserve
- Level: Senior
- Events: 38 (20 men, 18 women)

The 2004 Oceania Athletics Championships were held at the Townsville Sports Reserve in Townsville, Queensland, Australia, between December 16–18, 2004.

A total of 38 events were contested, 20 by men and 18 by women.

== Medal summary ==
Medal winners were published. Results for the athletes from Papua New Guinea can be found on the webpage of Athletics PNG. Complete results can be found on the website of the Ligue de Nouvelle Calédonie Athlétisme (LNCA).

=== Men ===
| Event | Gold | | Silver | | Bronze | |
|---|---|---|---|---|---|---|
| 100 metres (wind: -0.1 m/s) | Andrew Moore; New Zealand | 10.78 | Eroni Tuivanuavou; Fiji | 10.88 | Otis Gowa; Australia | 10.91 |
| 200 metres (wind: +3.8 m/s) | Andrew Moore; New Zealand | 21.30w | Moses Kamut; Vanuatu | 21.65w | Sam Rapson; New Zealand | 21.95w |
| 400 metres | Sam Rapson; New Zealand | 48.01 | Peter Tuccandidgee; Australia | 48.14 | Moses Kamut; Vanuatu | 48.36 |
| 800 metres | Neil Sampson; New Zealand | 1:56.16 | Gerard Parker; New Zealand | 1:58.52 | Yann Saulia; New Caledonia | 1:59.81 |
| 1500 metres | Neil Sampson; New Zealand | 4:00.10 | Luke Hurring; New Zealand | 4:03.04 | Chris Bais; Papua New Guinea | 4:10.13 |
| 5000 metres | Luke Hurring; New Zealand | 15:36.08 | Abdullah Guled; New Zealand | 15:46.89 | Andrew Hall; Australia | 16:08.07 |
| Half Marathon | Andrew Hall; Australia | 1:16:07 | Abdullah Guled; New Zealand | 1:16:59 | Shawn Claydon; Australia | 1:19:38 |
| 3000 metres steeplechase | Rodney Rapasi Gapirongo; Solomon Islands | 10:59.44 | Tekooki Teieka; Kiribati | 12:13.41 | Magic Felise; American Samoa | 18:03.32 |
| 110 metres hurdles (wind: +0.9 m/s) | Avele Tanielu; Samoa | 14.85 CR | Aleki Toetu'u Sapoi; Tonga | 15.59 | Tamatoa Laibe; French Polynesia | 16.03 |
| 400 metres hurdles | Aleki Toetu'u Sapoi; Tonga | 54.38 | Meli Cama; Fiji | 54.67 | Kumimo'ui Uhila; Tonga | 62.66 |
| High jump | Rajendra Prasad; Fiji | 1.95 | Stellio Tauraa; French Polynesia | 1.95 | Sandy Katusele; Papua New Guinea | 1.90 |
| Pole vault | Jeremy McColl; New Zealand | 4.40 | Tamatoa Laibe; French Polynesia | 4.00 | Brendon Albrey; New Zealand | 3.50 |
| Long jump | Melvin Hamou; New Caledonia | 6.86 (wind: +0.0 m/s) | Nathaniel Franklin; Australia | 6.82 (wind: +0.2 m/s) | Sandy Katusele; Papua New Guinea | 6.62 (wind: -1.2 m/s) |
| Triple jump | Sandy Katusele; Papua New Guinea | 14.70 (wind: +1.6 m/s) | James Murphy; Australia | 14.28 (wind: +1.6 m/s) | Kumimo'ui Uhila; Tonga | 13.50 (wind: +1.8 m/s) |
| Shot put | Shaka Sola; Samoa | 17.86 CR | Faleono Seve; Samoa | 15.08 | Sosefo Fonorito; Fiji | 14.78 |
| Discus throw | Shaka Sola; Samoa | 53.79 CR | Salesi Ahokovi; Tonga | 51.30 | Justin Andre; Guam | 48.15 |
| Hammer throw | Faleono Seve; Samoa | 53.00 | Justin Andre; Guam | 49.73 | Shaka Sola; Samoa | 45.94 |
| Javelin throw | Karl Fitzpatrick; New Zealand | 56.47 | Andrew Welsh; Australia | 56.06 | Michael Browne; New Zealand | 52.96 |
| Pentathlon | Nathan Baart; Australia | 3078 CR | Tamatoa Laibe; French Polynesia | 3027 | Brendan Peeters; Australia | 2918 |
| 4 x 100 metres relay (Exhibition) | New Zealand; Jeremy McColl; Sam Rapson; Craig Sneddon; Andrew Moore | 41.49 CR | Australia; Lars Hansen; Julius Nyambane; Peter Tuccandidgee; Otis Gowa | 42.20 | Tonga; Philip-Funaki Palanite; Kumimo'ui Uhila; Aisea Tohi; Aleki Sapoi | 43.84 |
| 800 metres Medley relay | Vanuatu; John Ernest Nakou; Abraham Kepsin; Sam Kaiapam; Moses Kamut | 1:34.86 | Papua New Guinea; Sammy Sasama; Andrew Doonar; Fabian Niulai; Chris Bais | 1:35.01 | Solomon Islands; Wycliffe Osoa; Francis Manioru; Jack Iroga; Chris Meke Walasi | 1:35.48 |

=== Women ===
| Event | Gold | | Silver | | Bronze | |
|---|---|---|---|---|---|---|
| 100 metres (wind: +2.3 m/s) | Mae Koime; Papua New Guinea | 12.02w | Latai Sikuvea; Tonga | 12.04w | Marie-Claude Haluatr; New Caledonia | 12.65w |
| 200 metres (wind: +0.4 m/s) | Mae Koime; Papua New Guinea | 24.68 | Latai Sikuvea; Tonga | 24.88 | Casey Cunningham; Australia | 24.95 |
| 400 metres | Casey Cunningham; Australia | 55.92 | Maria Kaupa; Papua New Guinea | 58.92 | Mereoni Raluve; Fiji | 59.38 |
| 800 metres | Riana Dinsmore; Australia | 2:20.84 | Salome Dell; Papua New Guinea | 2:20.92 | Merelaisa Dawaqa; Fiji | 2:44.42 |
| 1500 metres | Julia Scoones; New Zealand | 4:52.60 | Salome Dell; Papua New Guinea | 4:54.48 | Latia Tuifutuna; Tonga | 5:44.35 |
| 5000 metres | Julia Scoones; New Zealand | 19:49.29 | Banrenga Baikia; Kiribati | 22:47.88 | | |
| 100 metres hurdles (wind: +0.1 m/s) | Cécile Tiatia; French Polynesia | 15.33 | Gemma Radford; New Zealand | 15.94 | Melesia Mafile'o; Tonga | 16.02 |
| 400 metres hurdles | Cécile Tiatia; French Polynesia | 63.70 | Riana Dinsmore; Australia | 65.76 | Gemma Radford; New Zealand | 66.19 |
| High jump | Véronique Boyer; French Polynesia | 1.78 CR | Marissa Pritchard; New Zealand | 1.65 | Anna Molineaux; New Zealand | 1.60 |
| Pole vault | Amber Grogan; New Zealand | 3.40 | | | | |
| Long jump | Soko Salaqiqi; Fiji | 5.52 (wind: +0.9 m/s) | Melesia Mafile'o; Tonga | 5.33w (wind: +2.6 m/s) | Colleen Rehbein; Australia | 5.24 (wind: +0.9 m/s) |
| Triple jump | Véronique Boyer; French Polynesia | 12.64 (wind: +1.1 m/s) CR | Melesia Mafile'o; Tonga | 12.15 (wind: +0.2 m/s) | Marissa Pritchard; New Zealand | 11.92 (wind: +0.0 m/s) |
| Shot put | Ana Po'uhila; Tonga | 14.89 | Tereapii Tapoki; Cook Islands | 14.58 | Melehifo Uhi; Tonga | 14.22 |
| Discus throw | Tereapii Tapoki; Cook Islands | 52.98 CR | Melehifo Uhi; Tonga | 52.01 | Ana Po'uhila; Tonga | 45.49 |
| Hammer throw | Andrea Vigers; New Zealand | 46.61 | Helen Dunkley; Australia | 43.28 | Siniva Marsters; Cook Islands | 41.53 |
| Javelin throw | Serafina Akeli; Samoa | 50.22 CR | Kate Smith; Australia | 42.62 | Tammy Martin; Australia | 40.67 |
| Pentathlon | Dolores Dogba; French Polynesia | 2713 CR | Melesia Mafile'o; Tonga | 2660 | Vikatolia Manumu'a; Tonga | 2034 |
| 4 x 100 metres relay (Exhibition) | Australia; Brooke Gillham; Kimara Timms; Casey Cunningham; Amilia Wallace | 49.27 CR | Tonga; Kaati Malua; Patiola Pahulu; Penateti Feke; Latai Sikuvea | 49.54 | New Zealand; Nicole Jenness; Christa Clyde; Joelene Hardy; Jenna Erkila | 49.67 |
| 800 metres Medley relay | Australia; Kate Smith; Brooke Gillham; Kimara Timms; Casey Cunningham | 1:49.80 | Fiji; Soko Salaniqiqi; Milika Tuivanuavou; Miriama Radiniwaimaro; Merelaisa Dawaqa | 1:51.56 | New Zealand; Amber Grogan; Christa Clyde; Joelene Hardy; Gemma Radford | 1:52.39 |

== Medal table (unofficial) ==
* Host nation (Australia)

| Rank | Nation | Gold | Silver | Bronze | Total |
|---|---|---|---|---|---|
| 1 | New Zealand (NZL) | 12 | 6 | 7 | 25 |
| 2 | Australia (AUS)* | 5 | 7 | 7 | 19 |
| 3 | French Polynesia (PYF) | 5 | 3 | 1 | 9 |
| 4 | Samoa (SAM) | 5 | 1 | 1 | 7 |
| 5 | Papua New Guinea (PNG) | 3 | 4 | 3 | 10 |
| 6 | Tonga (TON) | 2 | 8 | 7 | 17 |
| 7 | Fiji (FIJ) | 2 | 3 | 3 | 8 |
| 8 | Cook Islands (COK) | 1 | 1 | 1 | 3 |
| 8 | Vanuatu (VAN) | 1 | 1 | 1 | 3 |
| 10 | New Caledonia (NCL) | 1 | 0 | 2 | 3 |
| 11 | Solomon Islands (SOL) | 1 | 0 | 1 | 2 |
| 12 | Kiribati (KIR) | 0 | 2 | 0 | 2 |
| 13 | Guam (GUM) | 0 | 1 | 1 | 2 |
| 14 | American Samoa (ASA) | 0 | 0 | 1 | 1 |
| Totals (14 entries) | | 38 | 37 | 36 | 111 |

== Participation (unofficial) ==
The participation of athletes from 18 countries could be determined from the published results list.

- American Samoa
- Australia
- Cook Islands
- Fiji
- French Polynesia
- Guam
- Kiribati
- Federated States of Micronesia
- Nauru
- New Caledonia
- New Zealand
- Northern Mariana Islands
- Palau
- Papua New Guinea
- Samoa
- Solomon Islands
- Tonga
- Vanuatu
