= 2016 Micronesian Championships in Athletics =

V Micronesian Championships in Athletics
- Dates: 2–4 June
- Host city: Kolonia, Federated States of Micronesia
- Level: Senior

The 2016 Micronesian Championships in Athletics took place from 2 to 4 June 2016. The event was held in Kolonia, Federated States of Micronesia.

== Medal summary ==
=== Men ===
Event	Gold		Silver		Bronze	
100 metres (+1.6 m/s)	Rodman Teltull; Palau	10.55 CR	Kitson Kapiriel; Federated States of Micronesia	11.01	Joshua Jeremiah; Federated States of Micronesia	11.26
200 metres (+0.2 m/s)	Rodman Teltull; Palau	21.93 CR	Kitson Kapiriel; Federated States of Micronesia	22.93	Matt Wong; Guam	23.36
400 metres	Casey Henry; Federated States of Micronesia	52.78	Gwynn Uehara; Palau	53.60	Benon Kin; Federated States of Micronesia	53.61
800 metres	Casey Henry; Federated States of Micronesia	2:05.20	Joshua Ilustre; Guam	2:05.51	Matthew Pangelinan; Guam	2:09.11
1500 metres	Joshua Ilustre; Guam	4:31.92	Redley Paul; Federated States of Micronesia	4:44.07	Tae Hyun Kim; Palau	4:49.45
5000 metres	Redley Paul; Federated States of Micronesia	19:53.49	Alex Alexander; Federated States of Micronesia	19:56.82	Detrickson Ioanis; Federated States of Micronesia	19:58.17
10000 metres	Alex Alexander; Federated States of Micronesia	42:59.00	Detrickson Ioanis; Federated States of Micronesia	43:08.90	MJ Ioanis; Federated States of Micronesia	44:20.60
110 metres hurdles (+1.3 m/s)	Michael Herreros; Guam	17.62	Jushua Kapiriel; Federated States of Micronesia	18.89	Finley Mendiola; Federated States of Micronesia	19.59
400 metres hurdles	Matt Wong; Guam	59.67 CR	Casey Henry; Federated States of Micronesia	1:01.84	Michael Herreros; Guam	1:04.25
Long jump	Norbin Tiru; Guam	6.01 (+0.9 m/s)	Paul Dimalanta; Guam	5.97 (+1.4 m/s)	Ezra Maeladuzu; Nauru	5.71 (+1.2 m/s)
Triple jump	Matt Wong; Guam	12.27 (+1.0 m/s)	Daelan Alviz; Guam	11.56 (+0.9 m/s)	Ryan Elias; Federated States of Micronesia	11.33 (+1.1 m/s)
Shot put	Justin Andre; Guam	13.34	Joseph Dabana; Nauru	12.99	Christopher Esela; Nauru	11.51
Discus throw	Justin Andre; Guam	41.15 CR	Dison Soumei; Federated States of Micronesia	35.94	Joseph Dabana; Nauru	35.71
Hammer throw	Justin Andre; Guam	51.17 CR	Christopher Esela; Nauru	24.24	Frederick Canon; Nauru	20.37
Javelin throw	Nicholas James Gross; Northern Mariana Islands	43.97	Herney Ringlen; Federated States of Micronesia	43.34	Daniel Ekiek; Federated States of Micronesia	43.13
Octathlon	Robby George; Federated States of Micronesia	2926	Zachery Penias Osqalt; Federated States of Micronesia	2457		
4 × 100 metres relay	Federated States of Micronesia; Steve Mendiola; Jaynard Arnold; Roy Elwise; Kitson Kapiriel	44.51	Palau; Gwynn Uehara; Adolph Speng Demei; Keilan Kenny; Rodman Teltull	44.97	Nauru; Dysard Dageago; Ezra Maeladuzu; Harrison Harris; Joshua Jeremiah	45.69
4 × 400 metres relay	Guam	3:34.69	Federated States of Micronesia	3:36.96	Palau	3:43.16

=== Women ===
Event	Gold		Silver		Bronze	
100 metres (+1.6 m/s)	Zarinae Sapong; Northern Mariana Islands	13.35	Maria Carmella Robert; Federated States of Micronesia	13.75	Sinsina Kau; Federated States of Micronesia	14.03
200 metres (+0.3 m/s)	Zarinae Sapong; Northern Mariana Islands	27.87 CR	Lerissa Henry; Federated States of Micronesia	27.97	Sinsina Kau; Federated States of Micronesia	29.31
400 metres	Maria Ollet; Guam	1:03.46	Zarinae Sapong; Northern Mariana Islands	1:08.80	Reloliza Saimon; Federated States of Micronesia	1:10.26
800 metres	Maria Ollet; Guam	2:33.50	Reloliza Saimon; Northern Mariana Islands	2:44.38	Qumilinda Augustin; Federated States of Micronesia	2:46.40
1500 metres	Maria Ollet; Guam	5:32.14	Reloliza Saimon; Federated States of Micronesia	5:48.79	Genina Criss; Guam	5:52.18
5000 metres	Elizabeth Quintanilla; Guam	22:14.29	Qumilinda Augustin; Federated States of Micronesia	23:52.71	Genina Criss; Guam	24:30.62
10000 metres	Genina Criss; Guam	46:52.00	Qumilinda Augustin; Federated States of Micronesia	50:19.20	Elizabeth Quintanilla; Guam	51:42.30
100 metres hurdles	Aleina Thompsin; Federated States of Micronesia	20.68 nw				
Long jump	Reloliza Saimon; Federated States of Micronesia	3.90 (+1.4 m/s)				
Shot put	Sandonia Likor; Federated States of Micronesia	9.01	Margrete Finen; Federated States of Micronesia	8.66		
Javelin throw	Sandonia Likor; Federated States of Micronesia	25.61	Margrete Finen; Federated States of Micronesia	18.81		
4 × 100 metres relay	Federated States of Micronesia (Pohnpei State)	54.95	Federated States of Micronesia (Chuuk State)	55.50	Northern Mariana Islands	55.54
4 × 400 metres relay	Guam	4:25.06 CR	Federated States of Micronesia	4:37.29	Northern Mariana Islands	4:51.28

== Medal table (unofficial) ==
* Host nation (Federated States of Micronesia)

Rank	Nation	Gold	Silver	Bronze	Total
1	Guam (GUM)	15	3	6	24
2	Federated States of Micronesia (FSM)*	11	21	10	42
3	Northern Mariana Islands (NMI)	3	1	2	6
4	Palau (PLW)	2	2	2	6
5	Nauru (NRU)	0	2	5	7
Totals (5 entries)		31	29	25	85

== Participation ==
- Guam
- Marshall Islands
- Federated States of Micronesia
- Nauru
- Northern Mariana Islands
- Palau
