= Heiata Brinkfield =

French Polynesian athlete (born 1988)

Personal information
- Born: 4 April 1988

Sport
- Country: French Polynesia
- Sport: Steeplechase
Medal record
Women's Steeplechase
Representing Tahiti
Pacific Games
Bronze medal – third place	2015 Port Moresby	3,000m Steeplechase
Gold medal – first place	2011 Nouméa	3,000m Steeplechase
Silver medal – second place	2007 Apia	3,000m Steeplechase
Silver medal – second place	2007 Apia	1,500m
Polynesian Championships in Athletics
Silver medal – second place	2005 Papeete	800m
Silver medal – second place	2005 Papeete	1,500m

Heiata Brinkfield (born 4 April 1988) is a French Polynesian athlete specialising in Middle-distance running and the steeplechase who has represented French Polynesia at the Pacific Games and the Polynesian Championships in Athletics.

At the 2005 Polynesian Championships in Athletics she won silver in the 800 meters and 1,500 meters. At the 2007 South Pacific Games in Apia she won silver in the steeplechase and silver in the 1,500 meters. At the 2011 Pacific Games in Nouméa she won gold in the steeplechase. At the 2015 Pacific Games in Port Moresby she won bronze in the steeplechase.
