= Rodman Teltull =

Palauan sprinter

Personal information
- Born: 29 January 1994 (age 32) Koror
- Height: 1.70 m (5 ft 7 in)
- Weight: 57 kg (126 lb)

Sport
- Country: Palau
- Sport: Athletics
- Event: 100 metres
- Coached by: Nathan Podunajec

Achievements and titles
- Personal best: 10.53 (Canberra)
Medal record
Pacific Games
Silver medal – second place	2015 Port Moresby	100 m
Pacific Mini Games
Bronze medal – third place	2013 Mata-Utu	200 m
Micronesian Games
Gold medal – first place	2010 Koror	4x400 m relay
Silver medal – second place	2010 Koror	4x100 m relay
Bronze medal – third place	2010 Koror	200 m
Oceania Championships
Bronze medal – third place	2011 Apia	200 m
- Updated on 6 May 2013

Rodman Teltull (born 29 January 1994 in Koror, Palau) is a Palauan sprinter who competes in the 100 metres. He was flag bearer for Palau at the 2012 Summer Olympics opening ceremony. He took part in the 100 metres at the 2012 Summer Olympics in London, but did not progress past the preliminaries, though he set a career-best time of 11.06.

== Personal bests ==
Event	Result	Venue	Date
Outdoor
100 m	10.52 s (wind: +1.2 m/s)	(Fiji) Suva	8 Jul 2016
200 m	21.84 s (wind: +0.7 m/s)	(Australia) Brisbane	8 Mar 2015
Indoor
60 m	6.94 s	(United States) Portland	18 Mar 2016

== Achievements ==
Year	Competition	Venue	Position	Event	Notes
Representing Palau
2010	Oceania Youth Championships	Sydney, Australia	17th (h)	100m	11.72 (wind: +0.7 m/s)
2010	World Junior Championships	Moncton, Canada	47th (h)	100m	11.47 w (wind: +2.2 m/s)
2010	Micronesian Games	Koror, Palau	4th	100m	11.40 (NWI)
2010	Micronesian Games	Koror, Palau	3rd	200 m	23.29 s
2010	Micronesian Games	Koror, Palau	2nd	4 × 100 m relay	44.53 sec
2010	Micronesian Games	Koror, Palau	1st	4 × 400 m relay	3:31.76 min
2010	Youth Olympic Games	Singapore	25th (D)	100m	11.45 (wind: +0.2 m/s)
2010	Oceania Junior Championships	Cairns, Australia	10th (h)	100m	11.56 (wind: +0.9 m/s)
2010	Oceania Junior Championships	Cairns, Australia	10th (h)	200m	23.11 (wind: +0.9 m/s)
2010	Oceania Championships	Cairns, Australia	5th	4 × 100 m relay	44.22
2011	Oceania Championships (Regional Division West)	Apia, Samoa	4th	100m	11.54 (wind: +0.7 m/s)
2011	Oceania Championships (Regional Division West)	Apia, Samoa	3rd	200 m	23.37 s (wind: +0.8 m/s)
2011	World Championships	Daegu, South Korea	59th (pr)	100m	11.31 (wind: +1.2 m/s)
2011	Pacific Games	Nouméa, New Caledonia	11th (sf)	100m	11.60 (wind: -1.3 m/s)
2011	Pacific Games	Nouméa, New Caledonia	12th (h)	200m	23.22 (wind: -2.1 m/s)
2011	Pacific Games	Nouméa, New Caledonia	5th	4 × 100 m relay	43.99
2012	World Indoor Championships	Istanbul, Turkey	39th (h)	60 m	7.20
2012	Olympic Games	London, United Kingdom	64th (pr)	100 m	11.06 (wind: +0.9 m/s)
2013	Pacific Mini Games	Mata-Utu, Wallis and Futuna	7th (sf)^{1}	100m	10.87 (wind: +1.4 m/s)
2013	Pacific Mini Games	Mata-Utu, Wallis and Futuna	3rd	200m	22.07 (wind: -2.6 m/s)
2014	Micronesian Games	Palikir, Pohnpei	6th	200m	30.68
2015	Oceania Championships	Cairns, Australia	23rd (sf)	100m	12.51 (wind: +0.2 m/s)
2015	Oceania Championships	Cairns, Australia	7th	4 × 100 m relay	43.12
2015	World Championships	Beijing, China	47th (h)	100 m	10.72
2016	World Indoor Championships	Portland, United States	43rd (h)	60 m	6.94
2016	Olympic Games	Rio de Janeiro, Brazil	63rd (h)	100 m	10.64

^{1}: Did not show in the final.
