= Ron Fanuatanu =

Samoan former rugby union player

- Born: 7 July 1982 (age 44) Apia, Samoa
- Height: 6 ft 0 in (1.83 m)
- Weight: 199 lb (90 kg)

Rugby union career
- Position: Wing
Senior career
Years	Team	Apps	(Points)
2001-????	Marist St. Joseph		
International career
Years	Team	Apps	(Points)
2003	Samoa	2	(0)

Ron Fanuatanu (born 7 July 1982, Apia, Samoa) is a Samoan former rugby union player. He played as a wing.

== Career ==
His first international cap was against Ireland, at Apia, on June 20, 2003. He was also part of the 2003 Rugby World Cup roster, where he only played the match against Georgia at Perth.
