= Kaitinano Mwemweata =

Kiribati athlete

Personal information
- Nationality: Kiribati
- Born: July 22, 1984 (age 41) Butaritari
- Height: 165 cm (5.41 ft)
- Weight: 65 kg (143 lb)

Sport
- Sport: Athletics
Medal record
Women's Athletics
Representing Kiribati
Oceania Championships
Bronze medal – third place	2008 Saipan	400 m hurdles
Micronesian Championships
Gold medal – first place	2003 Koror	long jump
Kiribati National Games
Bronze medal – third place	2006	shot put
Silver medal – second place	2006	high jump
Gold medal – first place	2006	long jump
Gold medal – first place	2006	triple jump
Gold medal – first place	2006	100m sprint
Gold medal – first place	2006	200m sprint
- Updated on 22 April 2013

Kaitinano Mwemweata (born July 22, 1984) is an I-Kiribati athlete. She was the first person to compete for Kiribati at the Olympic Games, when she represented her country at the 100 metre sprint in Athens in 2004.

Mwemweata finished seventh out of eight in her heat, achieving a personal best of 13.07.

She was due to represent Kiribati again at the 2008 Summer Olympics in Beijing, competing in the 200 metre sprint, but had to withdraw after contracting tuberculosis. She was undergoing treatment at the time of the Games.

She won gold in the long jump at the Micronesian Championships, in Koror in 2003. She also took part in the World Athletics Championships in Edmonton in 2001.

At the Kiribati National Games of 2006, Mwemweata won a bronze medal in the shot put, a silver medal in the high jump, and four gold medals in long jump, the 100 metre sprint, the 200 metre sprint and the triple jump.

== Achievements ==
Year	Competition	Venue	Position	Event	Notes
Representing Kiribati
2008	Oceania Championships	Saipan, Northern Mariana Islands	3rd	400 m hurdles	81.71 s
