= Bo Wang =

Chinese jihadist

Bo Wang, also known by his nom de guerre Yusuf al-Sini (Arabic: يوسف الصيني, romanized: Yūsuf al-Ṣīnī, lit. 'Yusuf of China'), is a Chinese jihadist who participated in the First Libyan Civil War and the Syrian Civil War.

== Career ==
His early life is unknown. He converted to Islam in Indonesia in 2009 (he claimed that he converted to Islam after reading the works of Muslim Brotherhood leader Sayyid Qutb on the Internet), and then went to Libya to study Arabic. When the Libyan civil war broke out in 2011, he was working for a Chinese company in Libya. He did not comply with the Chinese government's order for its citizens to evacuate Libya, and he joined the Libyan anti-government rebels and threw himself into the Libyan civil war. In a speech in Tripoli on March 18 of that year, he publicly condemned Muammar Gaddafi's attack on Benghazi. After the "birth of the new Libya", he went to Syria to fight against Bashar al-Assad's government forces. According to a video uploaded to YouTube on March 17, 2013, Bo Wang warned the government of China in Mandarin Chinese, urging it to abandon its support for Bashar al-Assad, otherwise "all Islamic countries in the world will unite to impose economic sanctions on the government of China."
