= 2005 Polynesian Championships in Athletics =

II Polynesian Championships in Athletics
- Dates: October or November
- Host city: Papeete, French Polynesia
- Venue: Stade Pater Te Hono Nui
- Level: Senior
- Events: 22 (11 men, 10 women, 1 mixed)
- Participation: 5 nations

The 2005 Polynesian Championships in Athletics took place in October or November, 2005. The event was held at the Stade Pater Te Hono Nui in Papeete, French Polynesia.

A total of 22 events were contested, 11 by men, 10 by women, and 1 mixed.

== Medal summary ==
Complete results can be found on the Oceania Athletics Association webpage and on the webpage of the French Polynesia Athletics Federation (Fédération d'Athlétisme de Polynésie Française).

=== Men ===
Event	First		Second		Third	
100 metres	Inoke Finau; Tonga	11.66	Tevai Teiho; French Polynesia	11.77	Taupo Sefo; Samoa	11.78
200 metres	Taupo Sefo; Samoa	23.52	Toriki Urarii; French Polynesia	24.08	Adrian Ismaili; American Samoa	24.79
800 metres	Justin Monier; French Polynesia	2:02.17	Stany Conan; French Polynesia	2:05.57	Valentin Laboube; French Polynesia	2:06.54
1500 metres	Iulio Lafai; Samoa	4:33.04	Stany Conan; French Polynesia	4:39.17	Valentin Laboube; French Polynesia	4:40.90
110 metres hurdles	Toriki Urarii; French Polynesia	14.81 CR	Inoke Finau; Tonga	15.47	Simon Thieury; French Polynesia	15.50
High jump	Simon Thieury; French Polynesia	1.80m CR	Justin Monier; French Polynesia	1.60m		
Long jump	John Bosco Stowers; Samoa	6.18m	Arehoe Roura; French Polynesia	5.92m	Tevai Teiho; French Polynesia	5.88m
Triple jump	John Bosco Stowers; Samoa	13.02m	Salesi Sete; Tonga	12.82m	Arehoe Roura; French Polynesia	12.53m
Shot put	Tumatai Dauphin; French Polynesia	17.39m CR	Loic Tuira; French Polynesia	14.74m	Lonely Kengike; Tonga	13.84m
Discus throw	Tumatai Dauphin; French Polynesia	46.62m CR	Maitoa Pito; French Polynesia	45.54m	Mikaele O'Brien Manuele; Samoa	41.27m
Javelin throw	Vaihau Botari; French Polynesia	53.71m CR	Teamo Papa; French Polynesia	49.33m	Frédéric Wanai; French Polynesia	47.93m

=== Women ===
Event	First		Second		Third	
100 metres	Penateti Feke; Tonga	13.12	Taliilagi Murphy; Samoa	13.43	Sela Va’enuku; Tonga	13.49
200 metres	Taliilagi Murphy; Samoa	27.61	Glara Ngametua; Cook Islands	28.21	Raihei Tauaroa; French Polynesia	28.59
800 metres	Eka Faitala; Samoa	2:29.98	Heiata Brinkfield; French Polynesia	2:30.14	Heimata Noresmat; French Polynesia	2:38.76
1500 metres	Eka Faitala; Samoa	5:45.37	Heiata Brinkfield; French Polynesia	5:45.80	Neti Kae; Cook Islands	6:06.24
100 metres hurdles	Terani Faremiro; French Polynesia	15.10 CR	Johanna Sui; French Polynesia	15.65	Penateti Feke; Tonga	16.30
High jump	Terani Faremiro; French Polynesia	1.61m CR	Johanna Sui; French Polynesia	1.57m	Toakase Nau; Tonga	1.54m
Long jump	Coralie Gourdon; French Polynesia	4.79m CR	Samantha Lockington; Cook Islands	4.67m	Vahinetua Flaccadori; French Polynesia	4.52m
Triple jump	Toakase Nau; Tonga	10.30m CR	Vahinetua Flaccadori; French Polynesia	10.21m	Heiaute Estall; French Polynesia	10.05m
Shot put	Vanessa Wanai; French Polynesia	10.57m	Mako’o Koloa; Tonga	10.44m	Mahana Dexter; French Polynesia	10.37m
Discus throw	Mako’o Koloa; Tonga	31.31m	Tania Tiarii; French Polynesia	28.40m	Maria Magele; Samoa	26.46m
Javelin throw	Vanessa Wanai; French Polynesia	36.10m	Tekura Kaukura; Cook Islands	35.74m	Maria Magele; Samoa	30.45m

=== Mixed ===
Event	First		Second		Third	
800 metres Medley relay	Samoa; John Bosco Stowers; Taliilagi Murphy; Eka Faitala; Taupo Sefo	1:47.17	Tahiti Iti; Terootae Urarii; Vahinetua Flaccadori; Raihei Tauaroa; Tevai Teiho	1:49.90	Tahiti Nui; Toriki Urarii; Heiata Brinkfield; Johanna Sui; Justin Monnier	1:50.37

== Medal table (unofficial) ==
* Host nation (French Polynesia)

Rank	Nation	Gold	Silver	Bronze	Total
1	French Polynesia (TAH)*	11	15	11	37
2	Samoa (SAM)	7	1	4	12
3	Tonga (TON)	4	3	4	11
4	Cook Islands (COK)	0	3	1	4
5	American Samoa (ASA)	0	0	1	1
Totals (5 entries)		22	22	21	65
