= Clayton Kenty =

Northern Mariana Islander sprinter

Personal information
- Nationality: Northern Mariana Islander
- Born: 22 February 1991 (age 35)

Sport
- Sport: Track and field
- Event: 100m

Clayton Kenty (born 22 February 1991) is a Northern Mariana Islander sprinter. He competed in the 100 metres event at the 2009 World Championships in Athletics.
