= Rabangaki Nawai =

Kiribati athlete (born 1985)

Personal information
- Nationality: Kiribati
- Born: June 9, 1985 (age 41) Makin, Kiribati
- Height: 178 cm (5.84 ft)
- Weight: 83 kg (183 lb)

Sport
- Sport: Athletics
Medal record
Men's Athletics
Representing Kiribati
Oceania Championships
Silver medal – second place	2008 Saipan	Octathlon
Silver medal – second place	2006 Apia	Octathlon
- Updated on 22 April 2013

Rabangaki Nawai (born 9 June 1985) is a track and field sprint athlete who competes internationally for Kiribati.

Nawai represented Kiribati at the 2008 Summer Olympics in Beijing. He competed at the 100 metres sprint and placed 8th in his heat without advancing to the second round. He ran the distance in a time of 11.29 seconds.

== Achievements ==
Year	Competition	Venue	Position	Event	Notes
Representing Kiribati
2004	World Junior Championships	Grosseto, Italy	62nd (h)	100m	16.70 (wind: -0.7 m/s)
2006	Oceania Championships	Apia, Samoa	2nd	Octathlon	4992 pts
2008	Oceania Championships	Saipan, Northern Mariana Islands	2nd	Octathlon	4901 pts
