= Ngerak Florencio =

Palauan sprinter

Ngerak Florencio (born 27 June 1983 in Koror, Palau) is a track and field sprint athlete who competed internationally for Palau.

Florencio represented Palau at the 2004 Summer Olympics in Athens. She competed in the 100 metres, where she finished 7th in the heat and did not advance to the next round.
