= Siniva Marsters =

Personal information
- Born: 7 October 1980 (age 45) Cook Islands
- Height: 1.83 m (6 ft 0 in)
- Weight: 98 kg (216 lb; 15 st 6 lb)

Sport
- Sport: Track and field
- Event(s): Shot put, discus throw, hammer throw

Achievements and titles
- Personal best(s): Shot put: 11.26 m Discus throw: 43.27 m Hammer throw: 48.47 m

Siniva Marsters (born 7 October 1980) is a former Cook Islander female athlete who competed in discus throw, hammer throw and shot put.

Marsters was educated at Tereora College, and subsequently trained in New Zealand, Australia, and Europe. She first represented the Cook Islands internationally at the Coca Cola Games in Fiji in 1994. Since 2000 she has worked for the Cook Islands Sports and National Olympic Committee. In 2018 she became acting secretary-general following the dismissal of Robert Graham. In 2019 she moved to Suva, Fiji for a position with the Oceania National Olympic Committees.

== Achievements ==
Year	Competition	Venue	Position	Event	Notes
Representing Cook Islands
1997	World Championships	Athens, Greece	26th	Discus throw	35.22 m
2000	Oceania Championships	Adelaide, Australia	3rd place, bronze medalist(s)	Shot put	10.74 m
2002	Commonwealth Games	Manchester, United Kingdom	20th	Hammer throw	40.40 m
2003	World Championships	Stade de France, Paris	40th	Hammer throw	41.54 m
2004	Oceania Championships	Townsville, Australia	3rd place, bronze medalist(s)	Hammer throw	41.53 m
2006	Oceania Championships	Apia, Samoa	2nd place, silver medalist(s)	Hammer throw	41.51 m

== See also ==
- List of Cook Islands records in athletics
