= Oleai Sports Complex =

Sports venue in Saipan, Northern Mariana Islands

Coordinates: 15°09′50″N 145°42′35″E

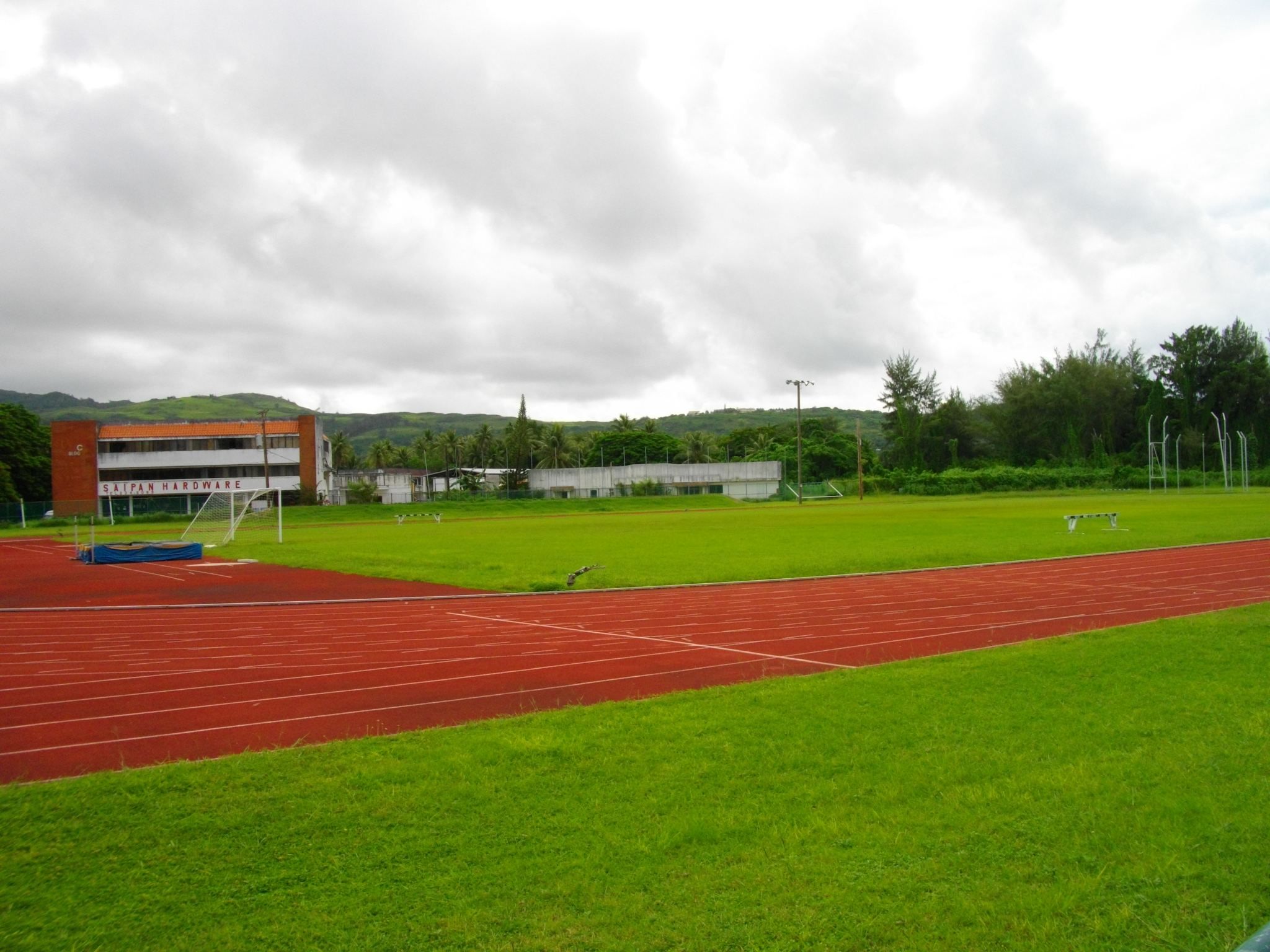
- Oleai Track and Field
- Interactive map of Oleai Sports Complex
- Capacity: 2.000

Oleai Sports Complex is a multi-use stadium in Saipan on the western Pacific Ocean Northern Mariana Islands. It is currently used mostly for football matches. The stadium has a capacity of 2,000 people. The surface is grass with an athletics track around the perimeter.

== Usage ==
The complex is run by the government of the Northern Mariana Islands. A weight room and a gymnasium are located on the site, the gymnasium hosting basketball, badminton and volleyball matches. The complex was used for the 2nd Micronesia Athletics Championships in 2005 and has been used as a training facility by visiting athletics teams. The complex also hosts little league baseball competitions.
