= Oceania Area Championships in Athletics =

Athletics event

Oceania Athletics Championships
- Status: active
- Genre: Athletics Oceania Championships
- Frequency: biennial
- Location: various
- Inaugurated: 1990
- Previous event: Suva 2024
- Next event: Darwin 2026
- Organiser: Oceania Athletics
- Website: OAA Official

The Oceania Athletics Championships is an athletics event organized by the Oceania Athletics Association (OAA) for the World Athletics (WA; formerly the IAAF) member associations of the Oceania region.

The event has been held jointly with the Under-20 Championships since 1994, Under-18 Championships since 2000, the Para Championships since 2022, and the Masters Championships since 2024.

== History ==
First held in 1990 in Suva, it was initially conceived as a quadrennial event; however, after the second edition in 1994, the championships changed to a biennial event. After the 2010 championships, there were significant changes in the format of the competition. Now being held as a regional championships (in 2011 and 2012), the associations were divided into two divisions based on their geographical location (either east or west). However, the competition was revised back to its original format as an area championships in 2013.

Since the inaugural championships in 1990 (up until 2017), unlike the rest of the OAA member federations, only Australia and New Zealand send their second tier teams to compete in the championships. This was to allow Pacific Island nations to be competitive and challenge for medals. However, in 2019, the championships increased in competition status with the then IAAF (now World Athletics) changing the qualification criteria for the 2019 World Championships in Doha and the 2020 Summer Olympics, whereby athletes could qualify through World Athletics ranking points: continental - ie. area - championships were granted 'tier-one' status offering more ranking points under the WA world rankings system.

The 2021 edition set for Korman Stadium in Port Vila was cancelled due to the COVID-19 pandemic, making this the first cancellation of the event.

== Editions ==
Edition	Year	Host city	Host country	Date	Venue	Events	Nations	Athletes	Champions
1	1990	Suva	Fiji	11–14 July	National Stadium	39			New Zealand
2	1994	Auckland	New Zealand	22–26 February		38			New Zealand
3	1996	Townsville	Australia	28–30 November		42			New Zealand
4	1998	Nuku'alofa	Tonga	27–28 August	Teufaiva Stadium	39			New Zealand
5	2000	Adelaide	Australia	24–26 August	Santos Stadium	40			New Zealand
6	2002	Christchurch	New Zealand	12–14 December	Queen Elizabeth II Park	40			New Zealand
7	2004	Townsville	Australia	16–18 December	Townsville Sports Reserve	38			New Zealand
8	2006	Apia	Samoa	12–16 December	Apia Park	37			New Zealand
9	2008	Saipan	Northern Mariana Islands	25–28 June	Oleai Sports Complex	39			Fiji
10	2010	Cairns	Australia	23–25 September	Barlow Park	36			Australia
11	2013	Papeete	French Polynesia	3–5 June	Stade Pater Te Hono Nui	44			New Zealand
12	2014	Rarotonga	Cook Islands	24–26 June	BCI Stadium	40			Australia
13	2015	Cairns	Australia	8–10 May	Barlow Park	60			Australia
14	2017	Suva	Fiji	28 June–1 July	ANZ National Stadium	57			New Zealand
15	2019	Townsville	Australia	25–28 June	Townsville Sports Reserve	59			Australia
—	2021	Port Vila	Vanuatu	Cancelled due to COVID-19 pandemic					
16	2022	Mackay	Australia	7–11 June	Mackay Aquatic and Recreation Centre	46			Australia
17	2024	Suva	Fiji	4–8 June	HFC Bank Stadium	45			Australia
18	2026	Darwin	Australia	18–22 May	Arafura Stadium	37			Australia

== Medals (1990-2026) ==
The all-time Oceania Athletics Championships medal table is the sum of all medals won by OAA member federations, associate members, as well as invited teams from the very first edition till the most recent championships in 2026. All medals counted are based on the official results posted on the Oceania Athletics Association website.

Associate members with medals are listed in italic. Also listed in italic but are unranked are invited athletics teams.

Rank	Nation	Gold	Silver	Bronze	Total
1	Australia	235	235	195	665
2	New Zealand	210	137	101	448
3	Papua New Guinea	90	89	81	260
4	Fiji	75	60	61	196
5	Samoa	34	18	23	75
6	Tonga	25	35	43	103
7	French Polynesia	15	24	23	62
8	New Caledonia^{[1]}	12	21	20	53
9	Solomon Islands	10	10	12	32
–	Regional Australia^{[2]}	8	12	10	30
10	Vanuatu	7	16	16	39
11	Cook Islands	5	13	13	31
12	Guam	5	11	17	33
13	Norfolk Island	5	2	2	9
14	American Samoa	2	3	8	13
15	Kiribati	1	6	4	11
16	Northern Mariana Islands	1	4	3	8
–	(French Polynesia) Tahiti West Coast^{[3]}	1	0	3	4
–	(Australia) Australian Masters team^{[4]}	0	2	0	2
17	Palau	0	1	1	2
17	Wallis and Futuna^{[1]}	0	1	1	2
19	Nauru	0	0	4	4
20	Federated States of Micronesia	0	0	1	1
20	Marshall Islands	0	0	1	1
Totals (21 entries)		741	700	643	2,084

- ^[1] Associate members of OAA - Not recognized by World Athletics. Since 2019, associate members are not eligible for championship medals.
- ^[2] Regional Australia is an invitational team from Northern Australia, competed at every championships since 2013. Since 2019, invitational teams are not eligible for championship medals.
- ^[3] Tahiti West Coast competed once in 2013 as a local team from the host federation of French Polynesia.
- ^[4] Australia Masters team competed once in 2015 as an invited team from the host federation of Australia.

As of 2019, only Tuvalu (OAA member federation) and Niue (OAA associate member) have yet to win a medal.

== See also ==
- Oceania U20 Athletics Championships
- Oceania U18 Athletics Championships
- Oceania Para Athletics Championships
- Oceania Athletics Regional Championships
- Oceania Masters Athletics
