= 2023 Oceania Athletics Cup =

4th Oceania Cup
- Dates: 23–24 June
- Host city: Saipan, Northern Mariana Islands
- Venue: Oleai Stadium
- Level: Senior
- Events: 32
- Participation: 101 athletes

The 2023 Oceania Cup is an international track and field sporting event that was held in Saipan, Northern Mariana Islands, on 23–24 June 2023. It was the fourth edition of the Oceania Cup.

== Format ==
Athletes from the Oceania Athletics Association (OAA) member federations will take part in the Oceania Cup, representing 5 teams from Oceania. The teams have been selected by OAA to represent each region of the Pacific – Melanesia, Micronesia, and Polynesia, with the Northern Marianas (host) and Australia the only two federations having their own team.

The five teams will be competing over three days. The competition comprises a programme of 15 track and field events for men and women as well as 2 mixed relay events, giving a total of 32 events.

Teams may enter as many athletes as they like in every event (with the exception of the 3000 meters run and high jump), but only one male and one female athlete may compete and score. Teams are only allowed to have a maximum of two athletes of each gender in the high jump and 3000 meter run. Every team is allowed to enter no more than of just one team in the relay event(s).

Only those athletes from each team with the highest ranking will be eligible to score. However, in order to receive a score, athletes must register a performance. The top-eight athletes receive individual events score distributions of 10-8-6-5-4-3-2-1 based on their finishes. The five winning teams each receive 20-16-12-10-8 points for the relays. The team with the most points at the conclusion of the competition will be named the Oceania Athletics champions and awarded a trophy.

== Schedule ==
Time	Event
June 23
13:00	M Shot Put Final
13:00	W Discus Throw Final
13:45	W 100 Metres Hurdles Final
14:00	M 110 Metres Hurdles Final
14:00	M Triple Jump Final
14:00	W Triple Jump Final
15:00	W High Jump Final
16:00	M 1500 Metres Final
16:15	W 1500 Metres Final
16:30	W Shot Put Final
16:30	M Discus Throw Final
16:30	M High Jump Final
16:45	M 400 Metres Final
16:55	W 400 Metres Final
17:35	M 100 Metres Final
17:45	W 100 Metres Final
June 24
13:20	W 800 Metres Final
13:30	M 800 Metres Final
14:00	M Hammer Throw Final
14:00	W 200 Metres Final
14:15	M 200 Metres Final
15:00	W Hammer Throw Final
15:00	M Long Jump Final
15:35	W 400 Metres Hurdles Final
13:45	M 400 Metres Hurdles Final
16:15	W Long Jump Final
16:20	M 3000 Metres Final
16:35	W 3000 Metres Final
16:45	W Javelin Throw Final
16:45	M Javelin Throw Final
17:15	Mixed 4×100 Metres Relay Final
17:30	Mixed 4×400 Metres Relay Final

== Standings ==
Rank	Team	Points
1st place, gold medalist(s)	Melanesia	273
2nd place, silver medalist(s)	Polynesia	196
3rd place, bronze medalist(s)	Australia	190
4	Micronesia	163
5	Northern Mariana Islands	138

== Medal summary ==
=== Men ===
Event	Gold		Silver		Bronze	
100 metres Details	Leroy Kamau (PNG); Melanesia	10.65	Pais Wisil (PNG); Melanesia	10.72	Johnny Key (SAM); Polynesia	10.84
200 metres Details	Leroy Kamau (PNG); Melanesia	21.68	Daniel Blest (AUS); Australia	21.89	Pais Wisil (PNG); Melanesia	22.34
400 metres Details	Daniel Blest (AUS); Australia	47.68	Adolf Kauba (PNG); Melanesia	48.01	Daniel Baul (PNG); Melanesia	48.15
800 metres Details	Adolf Kauba (PNG); Melanesia	1:57.25	Rylie Cabalse (HAW); Polynesia	2:02.34	Sione Taufeulungaki (TGA); Polynesia	2:03.24
1500 metres Details	Rylie Cabalse (HAW); Polynesia	4:09.44	Aquila Turalom (PNG); Melanesia	4:09.57	Hugh Kent (GUM); Micronesia	4:21.95
3000 metres Details	Aquila Turalom (PNG); Melanesia	9:20.56	Hugh Kent (GUM); Micronesia	9:23.45	Tang Pony (NMI); Northern Marianas	10:56.65
110 metres hurdles Details	Kolone Alefosio (SAM); Polynesia	15.20	Karo Iga (PNG); Melanesia	16.09	Mason Calma (GUM); Micronesia	17.51
400 metres hurdles Details	Daniel Baul (PNG); Melanesia	53.41	Timothee Aumard (PYF); Polynesia	59.68	Mason Calma (GUM); Micronesia	1:00.33
High jump Details	Nicholas Kollias (AUS); Australia	2.15m	William Reed (MHL); Micronesia	1.90m	Karo Iga (PNG); Melanesia	1.85m
Long jump Details	Liam Fairweather (AUS); Australia	7.68m	Karo Iga (PNG); Melanesia	7.08m	Inoke Waisake (FIJ); Melanesia	6.70m
Triple jump Details	Inoke Waisake (FIJ); Melanesia	14.78m	Gum Mabor (AUS); Australia	13.61m	Teaiki Lenoir (PYF); Polynesia	13.37m
Shot put Details	Jonathan Detageouwa (NRU); Micronesia	16.07m	Jackson Mellor (AUS); Australia	13.98m	Elijah Poila (COK); Polynesia	13.37m
Discus throw Details	Elijah Poila (COK); Polynesia	43.87m	Jackson Mellor (AUS); Australia	42.86m	Jonathan Detageouwa (NRU); Micronesia	36.85m
Hammer throw Details	Benjamin Voogd (AUS); Australia	54.76m	Elijah Poila (COK); Polynesia	22.96m	Lyle Andrews (NMI); Northern Marianas	22.60m
Javelin throw Details	Karo Iga (PNG); Melanesia	52.04m	Nick Gross (NMI); Northern Marianas	45.56m	Douglas Schmidt (NMI); Northern Marianas	43.12m

=== Women ===
Event	Gold		Silver		Bronze	
100 metres Details	Regine Tugade-Watson (GUM); Micronesia	12.06	Leonie Beu (PNG); Melanesia	12.39	Charlotte Banks (AUS); Australia	12.51
200 metres Details	Leonie Beu (PNG); Melanesia	24.13	Alice Dixon (AUS); Australia	24.87	Adrine Monagi (PNG); Melanesia	25.24
400 metres Details	Leonie Beu (PNG); Melanesia	55.70	Alice Dixon (AUS); Australia	55.96	Hereiti Bernardino (PYF); Polynesia	58.75
800 metres Details	Nyree Hamilton (AUS); Australia	2:10.96	Lily Mather (AUS); Australia	2:12.15	Scholastica Herman (PNG); Melanesia	2:13.80
1500 metres Details	Lily Mather (AUS); Australia	4:42.10	Nyree Hamilton (AUS); Australia	4:42.47	Scholastica Herman (PNG); Melanesia	4:52.47
3000 metres Details	Leyla Liakatos (AUS); Australia	10:43.89	Tania Tan (NMI); Northern Marianas	10:53.08	Amandine Matera (PYF); Polynesia	11:12.57
100 metres hurdles Details	Adrine Monagi (PNG); Melanesia	14.46	Kiara Gilroy (PYF); Polynesia	16.31		
400 metres hurdles Details	Edna Boafob (PNG); Melanesia	1:03.38	Hereiti Bernardino (PYF); Polynesia	1:04.58	Kiara Gilroy (PYF); Polynesia	1:09.42
High jump Details	Edna Boafob (PNG); Melanesia	1.55m				
Long jump Details	Rellie Kaputin (PNG); Melanesia	5.76m	Alexandra Harrison (AUS); Australia	5.50m	Regine Tugade-Watson (GUM); Micronesia	5.34m
Triple jump Details	Rellie Kaputin (PNG); Melanesia	11.65m	Regine Tugade-Watson (GUM); Micronesia	11.00m		
Shot put Details	Emma Berg (AUS); Australia	15.26m	Sally Shokry (AUS); Australia	13.13m	Alexandra Morgan (ASA); Polynesia	12.54m
Discus throw Details	Alexandra Morgan (ASA); Polynesia	50.96m	Sally Shokry (AUS); Australia	45.93m	Mia Pulianos (MHL); Micronesia	39.01m
Hammer throw Details	Alysha Pearson (AUS); Australia	55.16m	Alexandra Morgan (ASA); Polynesia	39.11m	Taleyah Jones (NFK); Melanesia	36.80m
Javelin throw Details	Sharon Toako (PNG); Melanesia	46.56m	Genie Gerardo (GUM); Micronesia	27.11m	Maria Igitol (NMI); Northern Marianas	26.50m

=== Mixed ===
Event	Gold		Silver		Bronze	
4 × 100 m relay Details	Melanesia (A); Adrine Monagi (PNG); Leroy Kamau (PNG); Leonie Beu (PNG); Pais Wisil (PNG)	43.05	Melanesia (B); Chloe David (VAN); Inoke Waisake (FIJ); Rellie Kaputin (PNG); Karo Iga (PNG)	45.54	Polynesia; Kolone Alefosio (SAM); Johnny Key (SAM); Hereiti Bernardino (PYF); Filomenaleonisa Iakopo (ASA)	45.62
4 × 400 m relay Details	Australia; Liam Fairweather (AUS); Nyree Hamilton (AUS); Daniel Blest (AUS); Alice Dixon (AUS)	3:31.53	Melanesia; Daniel Baul (PNG); Leonie Beu (PNG); Adolf Kauba (PNG); Edna Boafob (PNG)	3:33.00	Polynesia; Timothee Aumard (PYF); Kiara Gilroy (PYF); Rylie Cabalse (HAW); Hereiti Bernardino (PYF)	3:47.43

== Participating nations ==
- Australia (AUS) (16)
- Northern Mariana Islands (NMI) (28) (Host)
- Melanesia
  - Fiji (FIJ) (1)
  - Norfolk Island (NFK) (1)
  - Papua New Guinea (PNG) (14)
  - Solomon Islands (SOL) (1)
  - Vanuatu (VAN) (1)
- Micronesia
  - Federated States of Micronesia (FSM) (6)
  - Guam (GUM) (12)
  - Kiribati (KIR) (2)
  - Marshall Islands (MHL) (1)
  - Nauru (NRU) (1)
- Polynesia
  - American Samoa (ASA) (2)
  - Cook Islands (COK) (1)
  - French Polynesia (PYF) (6)
  - Hawaii (HAW) (1)
  - Samoa (SAM) (3)
  - Tonga (TGA) (2)
  - Tuvalu (TUV) (1)
