= Papua New Guinea at the 2022 Commonwealth Games =

- Flag of Papua New Guinea
- CG code: PNG
- CGA: Papua New Guinea Olympic Committee
- Website: pngolympic.org

in Birmingham, England 28 July 2022 – 8 August 2022
- Competitors: 33 (21 men and 12 women) in 6 sports
- Flag bearers: John Ume; Rellie Kaputin
- Medals Ranked =35th: Gold 0 Silver 1 Bronze 0 Total 1

Commonwealth Games appearances (overview)
- 1962; 1966; 1970; 1974; 1978; 1982; 1986; 1990; 1994; 1998; 2002; 2006; 2010; 2014; 2018; 2022; 2026; 2030

Papua New Guinea competed at the 2022 Commonwealth Games in Birmingham, England between 28 July and 8 August 2022. It was the fifteenth time that Papua New Guinea competes at the Games.

Boxer John Ume and Track and field athlete Rellie Kaputin were the country's opening ceremony flagbearers.

== Medalists ==
| Medal | Name | Sport | Event | Date |
|---|---|---|---|---|
| Silver | Morea Baru | Weightlifting | Men's 61 kg | 30 July |

== Competitors ==
The following is the list of number of competitors participating at the Games per sport/discipline.

| Sport | Men | Women | Total |
|---|---|---|---|
| Athletics | 10 | 8 | 18 |
| Boxing | 6 | 0 | 6 |
| Squash | 2 | 1 | 3 |
| Swimming | 1 | 1 | 2 |
| Table tennis | 1 | 1 | 2 |
| Weightlifting | 1 | 1 | 2 |
| Total | 21 | 12 | 33 |

== Athletics (track and field) ==
On 6 July, 2022, Athletics Papua New Guinea announced a team of eighteen athletes (10 men and 8 women).

Men
Track and road events

| Athlete | Event | Heat | | Semifinal | | Final | |
| Athlete | Event | Result | Rank | Result | Rank | Result | Rank |
|---|---|---|---|---|---|---|---|
| Leroy Kamau | 100 m | 10.68 PB | 6 | did not advance | | | |
| Jonathan Dende | 200 m | 22.41 PB | 6 | did not advance | | | |
| Leroy Kamau | 200 m | 21.67 | 3 | did not advance | | | |
| Shadrick Tansi | 400 m | DQ | | did not advance | | | |
| Emmanuel Wanga | 400 m | 48.23 | 7 | did not advance | | | |
| Daniel Baul | 400 m hurdles | DNF | | —N/a | | did not advance | |
| Ephraim Lerkin | 400 m hurdles | 52.43 SB | 7 | —N/a | | did not advance | |
| | 4 × 400 m relay | DNS | | —N/a | | did not advance | |

Field events

| Athlete | Event | Qualification | | Final | |
| Athlete | Event | Distance | Rank | Distance | Rank |
|---|---|---|---|---|---|
| Peniel Richard | Triple jump | —N/a | | NM | |
| De'bono Paraka | Discus throw | 48.19 | 15 | did not advance | |
| Lakona Gerega | Javelin throw | —N/a | | 63.46 | 12 |

Combined events – Decathlon

| Athlete | Event | 100 m | LJ | SP | HJ | 400 m | 110H | DT | PV | JT | 1500 m | Final | Rank |
|---|---|---|---|---|---|---|---|---|---|---|---|---|---|
| Karo Iga | Result | 10.94 | 6.95 | 11.05 | 1.91 | 48.61 | 16.73 | 31.88 | 3.90 | 51.30 | 4:56.54 | 6761 | 7 |
| Karo Iga | Points | 874 | 802 | 549 | 723 | 880 | 653 | 502 | 590 | 608 | 580 | 6761 | 7 |

Women
Track and road events

| Athlete | Event | Heat | | Semifinal | | Final | |
| Athlete | Event | Result | Rank | Result | Rank | Result | Rank |
|---|---|---|---|---|---|---|---|
| Toea Wisil | 100 m | 11.79 SB | 5 | did not advance | | | |
| Isila Apkup | 200 m | 24.97 | 6 | did not advance | | | |
| Leonie Beu | 200 m | 25.29 | 4 | did not advance | | | |
| Toea Wisil | 200 m | 24.42 | 3 Q | 24.43 | 8 | did not advance | |
| Adrine Monagi | 100 m hurdles | 13.84 | 6 | did not advance | | | |
| Adrine Monagi; Toea Wisil; Isila Apkup; Leonie Beu | 4 × 100 m relay | 45.38 NR | 6 | —N/a | | did not advance | |

Field events

| Athlete | Event | Qualification | | Final | |
| Athlete | Event | Distance | Rank | Distance | Rank |
|---|---|---|---|---|---|
| Rellie Kaputin | Long jump | 5.95 | 15 | did not advance | |
| Annie Topal | Triple jump | —N/a | | 12.75 | 11 |
| Sharon Toako | Javelin throw | —N/a | | 39.34 | 8 |

Combined events – Heptathlon

| Athlete | Event | 100H | HJ | SP | 200 m | LJ | JT | 800 m | Final | Rank |
|---|---|---|---|---|---|---|---|---|---|---|
| Edna Boafob | Result | 16.42 | 1.51 m | 10.14 m | 26.15 | 4.77 m | 32.22 m | 2:53.05 | 4068 PB | 8 |
| Edna Boafob | Points | 664 | 632 | 539 | 784 | 498 | 519 | 432 | 4068 PB | 8 |

== Boxing ==
Men

| Athlete | Event | Round of 32 | Round of 16 | Quarterfinals | Semifinals | Final | |
| Athlete | Event | Opposition Result | Opposition Result | Opposition Result | Opposition Result | Opposition Result | Rank |
|---|---|---|---|---|---|---|---|
| Charles Keama | Flyweight | —N/a | Chinyemba (ZAM); L RSC | did not advance | | | |
| Jamie Chang | Bantamweight | —N/a | Bye | Harris-Allan (WAL); L 0–5 | did not advance | | |
| Allan Oaike | Featherweight | Bye | Commey (GHA); L RSC | did not advance | | | |
| John Ume | Light welterweight | Bonzo (MAW); W 4–1 | Tyers (ENG); L RSC-1 | did not advance | | | |
| Neville Warupi | Welterweight | Bye | Lele (SOL); W 4–1 | Jolly (SCO); L 0–5 | did not advance | | |
| Arthur Lavalou | Heavyweight | —N/a | Bye | Williams (ENG); L RSC | did not advance | | |

== Squash ==
Singles

| Athlete | Event | Round of 64 | Round of 32 | Round of 16 | Quarterfinals | Semifinals | Final | |
| Athlete | Event | Opposition Score | Opposition Score | Opposition Score | Opposition Score | Opposition Score | Opposition Score | Rank |
|---|---|---|---|---|---|---|---|---|
| Feonor Siaguru | Men's singles | Chileshe (NZL); L 0–3 | did not advance | | | | | |
| Madako Suari | Men's singles | Kamal (MAS); L 0–3 | did not advance | | | | | |
| Amity Alarcos | Women's singles | Bye | Turmel (ENG); L 0–3 | did not advance | | | | |

Doubles

| Athlete | Event | Round of 32 | Round of 16 | Quarterfinals | Semifinals | Final | |
| Athlete | Event | Opposition Score | Opposition Score | Opposition Score | Opposition Score | Opposition Score | Rank |
|---|---|---|---|---|---|---|---|
| Feonor Siaguru; Madako Suari | Men's doubles | T.Chileshe & L.Chileshe (NZL); L 0–2 | did not advance | | | | |
| Feonor Siagaru; Amity Alarcos | Mixed doubles | Lobban & Pilley (AUS); L 0–2 | did not advance | | | | |

== Swimming ==
Men

| Athlete | Event | Heat | | Semifinal | | Final | |
| Athlete | Event | Time | Rank | Time | Rank | Time | Rank |
|---|---|---|---|---|---|---|---|
| Ryan Maskelyne | 50 m breaststroke | 29.53 | 26 | did not advance | | | |
| Ryan Maskelyne | 100 m breaststroke | 1:03.31 | 19 | did not advance | | | |
| Ryan Maskelyne | 200 m breaststroke | 2:15.91 | 8 Q | —N/a | | 2:16.98 | 8 |

Women

| Athlete | Event | Heat | | Semifinal | | Final | |
| Athlete | Event | Time | Rank | Time | Rank | Time | Rank |
|---|---|---|---|---|---|---|---|
| Georgia-Leigh Vele | 50 m freestyle | 27.80 | 36 | did not advance | | | |
| Georgia-Leigh Vele | 100 m freestyle | 1:01.60 | 42 | did not advance | | | |
| Georgia-Leigh Vele | 50 m breaststroke | 36.51 | 25 | did not advance | | | |
| Georgia-Leigh Vele | 50 m butterfly | 30.34 | 39 | did not advance | | | |

== Table tennis ==
Papua New Guinea qualified two players for the table tennis competitions.

Singles

| Athletes | Event | Group stage | | | Round of 32 | Round of 16 | Quarterfinal | Semifinal | Final / BM |
| Athletes | Event | Opposition Score | Opposition Score | Rank | Opposition Score | Opposition Score | Opposition Score | Opposition Score | Rank |
|---|---|---|---|---|---|---|---|---|---|
| Geoffrey Loi | Men's singles | Knight (BAR); L 0–4 | Wong (MAS); L 0–4 | 3 | did not advance | | | | |
| Tammi Agari | Women's singles | Edghill (GUY); L 0–4 | Titana (FIJ); L 3–4 | 3 | did not advance | | | | |

Doubles

| Athletes | Event | Round of 64 | Round of 32 | Round of 16 | Quarterfinal | Semifinal | Final / BM | |
| Athletes | Event | Opposition Score | Opposition Score | Opposition Score | Opposition Score | Opposition Score | Opposition Score | Rank |
|---|---|---|---|---|---|---|---|---|
| Tammi Agari; Geoffrey Loi | Mixed doubles | Jarvis & Bardsley (ENG); L 0–3 | did not advance | | | | | |

== Weightlifting ==
Papua New Guinea qualified two weightlifters (one man, one woman) via the IWF Commonwealth Ranking List, which was finalised on 9 March 2022.

| Athlete | Event | Weight lifted | | Total | Rank |
| Athlete | Event | Snatch | Clean & jerk | Total | Rank |
|---|---|---|---|---|---|
| Morea Baru | Men's 61 kg | 121 | 152 | 273 | 2nd place, silver medalist(s) |
| Dika Toua | Women's 49 kg | 74 | 96 | 170 | 5 |
