= Samoa at the 2022 Commonwealth Games =

- Flag of Samoa
- CGF code: SAM
- CGA: Samoa Association of Sports and National Olympic Committee
- Website: sasnoc.com

in Birmingham, England
- Competitors: 38 (34 men and 4 women) in 7 sports
- Medals Ranked 19th: Gold 1 Silver 4 Bronze 0 Total 5

Commonwealth Games appearances (overview)
- 1974; 1978; 1982; 1986; 1990; 1994; 1998; 2002; 2006; 2010; 2014; 2018; 2022; 2026; 2030

Samoa competed at the 2022 Commonwealth Games in Birmingham, England between 28 July and 8 August 2022. It was Samoa's thirteenth appearance at the Games. On 13 July 2022 SASNOC announced a team of 38 athletes competing in seven sports would represent Samoa.

== Medalists ==
Medal	Name	Sport	Event	Date
(gold) Gold	Don Opeloge	Weightlifting	Men's 96 kg	2 August
Silver	Vaipava Ioane	Weightlifting	Men's 67 kg	31 July
Silver	Jack Opeloge	Weightlifting	Men's 109 kg	3 August
Silver	Feagaiga Stowers	Weightlifting	Women's +87 kg	3 August
Silver	Ato Plodzicki-Faoagali	Boxing	Heavyweight	7 August

== Competitors ==
The following is the list of number of competitors participating at the Games per sport/discipline.

Sport	Men	Women	Total
Athletics	8	1	9
Boxing	3	0	3
Judo	1	0	1
Rugby sevens	13	0	13
Swimming	2	2	4
Weightlifting	5	1	6
Wrestling	2	0	2
Total	34	4	38

== Athletics ==
A squad of eight athletes was announced on 13 July 2022.

Men
Track and road events

Athlete	Event	Heat		Semifinal		Final	
Athlete	Event	Result	Rank	Result	Rank	Result	Rank
William Hunt	100 m	10.70	5	did not advance			
Pesamino Iakopo	100 m	11.29	7	did not advance			
Johnny Key	100 m	10.98	5	did not advance			
Jeremy Dodson	200 m	21.46	4	did not advance			
William Hunt	200 m	DSQ		did not advance			
Johnny Key	200 m	22.38	6	did not advance			
Kolone Alefosio	110 m hurdles	14.78	7	—		did not advance	
William Hunt; Kelvin Masoe; Johnny Key; Jeremy Dodson	4 × 100 m relay	40.60	5	—		did not advance	

Field events

Athlete	Event	Qualification		Final	
Athlete	Event	Distance	Rank	Distance	Rank
Kelvin Masoe	Long jump	6.75	17	did not advance	
Alex Rose	Discus throw	63.20	4 q	64.56	4
Donny Tuimaseve	Javelin throw	—		63.14	13

Women
Field events

Athlete	Event	Qualification		Final	
Athlete	Event	Distance	Rank	Distance	Rank
Nu'u Tuilefano	Shot put	16.10	11 q	15.81	11

== Boxing ==
A squad of three boxers was announced on 13 July 2022.

Men

Athlete	Event	Round of 32	Round of 16	Quarterfinals	Semifinals	Final	
Athlete	Event	Opposition Result	Opposition Result	Opposition Result	Opposition Result	Opposition Result	Rank
Marion Faustino Ah Tong	Light middleweight	Bye	Vittalis (SRI); W 5 - 0	Mbundwike (TAN); L RSC	did not advance		
Jancen Poutoa	Light heavyweight	Bye	Bevan (WAL); L RSC	did not advance			
Ato Plodzicki-Faoagali	Heavyweight	—	Sanjeet (IND); W 3 - 2	Andall (GRN); W RSC	T-Williams (NIU); W 5 - 0	Williams (ENG); L 0 - 5	2nd place, silver medalist(s)

== Judo ==
One judoka was officially selected as of 13 July 2022.

Men

Athlete	Event	Round of 16	Quarterfinals	Semifinals	Repechage	Final/BM	
Athlete	Event	Opposition Result	Opposition Result	Opposition Result	Opposition Result	Opposition Result	Rank
William Tai Tin	-73 kg	Majeed (MAS); L 00 - 10	did not advance				9

== Rugby sevens ==
As of 9 March 2022, Samoa qualified for the men's tournament. This was achieved through their positions in the 2018–19 / 2019–20 World Rugby Sevens Series.

The thirteen-man roster was announced on 13 July 2022.

Summary

Team	Event	Preliminary Round				Quarterfinal / CQ	Semifinal / CS	Final / BM / CF	
Team	Event	Opposition Result	Opposition Result	Opposition Result	Rank	Opposition Result	Opposition Result	Opposition Result	Rank
Samoa men's	Men's tournament	England; W 38 - 0	New Zealand; L 17 - 19	Sri Lanka; W 44 - 0	2 Q	Australia; L 0 - 7	Canada; W 19 - 17	Scotland; W 24 - 19	5

=== Men's tournament ===
Roster

- Fa'afoi Falaniko
- Iafeta Purcell
- Levi Milford
- Melani Matavao
- Motu Opetai
- Neueli Leitufia
- Owen Niue
- Paul Scanlan
- Steve Onosai
- Taunu'u Niulevaea
- Uaina Sione
- Va'a Apelu Maliko
- Vaovasa Afa

Pool A

Pos	Team	Pld	W	D	L	PF	PA	PD	Pts	Qualification
1	New Zealand	3	3	0	0	102	22	+80	9	Advance to Quarter-finals
2	Samoa	3	2	0	1	99	19	+80	7	Advance to Quarter-finals
3	England	3	1	0	2	47	77	−30	5	Advance to classification Quarter-finals
4	Sri Lanka	3	0	0	3	24	154	−130	3	Advance to classification Quarter-finals

Source: Birmingham2022
Rules for classification: 1) Points; 2) Head-to-head result; 3) Point difference; 4) Points scored.

29 July 2022
11:34

England	0–38	Samoa
	Report	Try: Onosai (3) 2' c, 6' m, 7' m Maliko 5' c Falaniko 12' m Con: Matavao (2/5) 3', 5'; Purcell (0/1); Cards: Leitufia (yellow card) 11'

Coventry Stadium, Coventry
Referee: Jordan Way (Australia)

29 July 2022
20:04

New Zealand	19–17	Samoa
Try: Dickson 7' c Webber 9' m Tangitau 12' c Con: McGarvey-Black (2/3) 7', 13'	Report	Try: Scanlan 1' c Niue 3' m Maliko 5' m Con: Matavao (1/3) 1'

Coventry Stadium, Coventry
Referee: Adam Leal (England)

30 July 2022
11:12

Samoa	44–0	Sri Lanka
Try: Scanlan (4) 1' m, 4' m, 5' m, 6' m Opetai 7' c Sione 8' c Niue 10' m Onosai 14' m Con: Purcell (1/5) 9'; Leitufia (1/3) 7'	Report

Coventry Stadium, Coventry
Referee: Talal-Azmat Chaudhry (Canada)

Quarterfinals

30 July 2022
21:32

Australia	7–0	Samoa
Try: Gonzalez 8' c Con: Roache (1/1) 8'; Cards: Malouf (yellow card) 10'	Report

Coventry Stadium, Coventry
Referee: Nick Hogan (New Zealand)

5th-8th Semifinals

31 July 2022
12:20

Samoa	19–17	Canada
Try: Onosai (2) 6' c, 11' c Sione 9' m Con: Matavao (2/3) 6', 11'; Cards: Afa (yellow card) 8'	Report	Try: Thiel (2) 1' c, 3' m Coats 14' m Con: Coats (1/3) 1'

Coventry Stadium, Coventry
Referee: Morné Ferreira (South Africa)

5th Place Match

31 July 2022
19:28

Scotland	19–24	Samoa
Try: Fergusson 6' m Sofolarin 8' c, 9' c Con: Barreto (2/3) 8', 9'	Report	Try: Niue 1' c Onosai 7' m Leitufia 11' c, 12' m Con: Matavao (1/1) 1'; Purcell (1/3) 11'

Coventry Stadium, Coventry
Referee: Morné Ferreira (South Africa)

== Swimming ==
A squad of four swimmers was announced on 13 July 2022.

Men

Athlete	Event	Heat		Semifinal		Final	
Athlete	Event	Time	Rank	Time	Rank	Time	Rank
Brandon Schuster	100 m freestyle	53.17	42	did not advance			
Brandon Schuster	200 m breaststroke	2:22.37	12	—		did not advance	
Brandon Schuster	200 m individual medley	2:09.85	17	—		did not advance	
Kokoro Frost	50 m backstroke	28.37	35	did not advance			
Kokoro Frost	100 m backstroke	1:05.05	35	did not advance			
Kokoro Frost	50 m butterfly	26.00	36	did not advance			
Kokoro Frost	100 m butterfly	1:00.53	43	did not advance			

Women

Athlete	Event	Heat		Semifinal		Final	
Athlete	Event	Time	Rank	Time	Rank	Time	Rank
Olivia Borg	50 m freestyle	did not start		did not advance			
Olivia Borg	100 m freestyle	57.53	22	did not advance			
Olivia Borg	50 m butterfly	27.42	16 Q	27.37	15	did not advance	
Olivia Borg	100 m butterfly	1:02.62	25	did not advance			
Lushavel Stickland	50 m freestyle	28.08	42	did not advance			
Lushavel Stickland	50 m backstroke	30.46	19	did not advance			
Lushavel Stickland	100 m backstroke	1:07.51	21	did not advance			

Mixed

Athlete	Event	Heat		Final	
Athlete	Event	Time	Rank	Time	Rank
Brandon Schuster; Kokoro Frost; Olivia Borg; Lushavel Stickland	4 × 100 m freestyle relay	3:52.67	15	did not advance	
Lushavel Stickland; Brandon Schuster; Olivia Borg; Kokoro Frost	4 × 100 m medley relay	4:13.66	13	did not advance	

== Weightlifting ==
Six weightlifters qualified for the competition by virtue of their positions in the IWF Commonwealth Ranking List.

Athlete	Event	Weight lifted		Total	Rank
Athlete	Event	Snatch	Clean & jerk	Total	Rank
Vaipava Ioane	Men's 67 kg	127 kg	166 kg GR	293 kg	2nd place, silver medalist(s)
John Tafi	Men's 73 kg	131 kg	165 kg	296 kg	4
Don Opeloge	Men's 96 kg	171 kg GR	210 kg GR	381 kg GR	1st place, gold medalist(s)
Jack Opeloge	Men's 109 kg	164	194	358	2nd place, silver medalist(s)
Petelo Lautusi	Men's +109 kg	165	206	371	4
Feagaiga Stowers	Women's +87 kg	121	147	268	2nd place, silver medalist(s)

== Wrestling ==
A squad of two wrestlers was selected as of 27 June 2022.

Key:

- VT - Victory by Fall.
- PP - Decision by Points - the loser with technical points.
- PO - Decision by Points - the loser without technical points.

Athlete	Event	Round of 16	Quarterfinal	Semifinal	Repechage	Final / BM	
Athlete	Event	Opposition Result	Opposition Result	Opposition Result	Opposition Result	Opposition Result	Rank
Taitaifono Tamati	Men's -86 kg	Lessing (RSA); L 0 - 10 (VSU)	did not advance				14
Maulalo Alofipo	Men's -97 kg	Bye	Sika (TGA); W 11 - 0	de Lange (RSA); L 0 - 10	—	Barns (AUS); L 0 - 12	5
