= Athletics at the 2023 Pacific Games =

- Athletics pictogram
- Venue: Solomon Islands National Stadium
- Location: Honiara, Solomon Islands
- Dates: 27 November – 2 December 2023

Athletics at the 2023 Pacific Games in Solomon Islands was held on 27 November until 2 December 2023. The events will take place at the Solomon Islands National Stadium.

== Medal table ==
* Host nation (Solomon Islands)

Rank	Nation	Gold	Silver	Bronze	Total
1	Australia	12	3	0	15
2	New Caledonia	11	11	10	32
3	Papua New Guinea	8	12	11	31
4	Tahiti	6	3	4	13
5	Fiji	5	4	8	17
6	New Zealand	3	6	2	11
7	Wallis and Futuna	3	2	2	7
8	Samoa	2	1	4	7
9	Northern Mariana Islands	2	0	0	2
10	Solomon Islands*	1	7	5	13
11	Vanuatu	1	2	3	6
12	Tonga	0	2	0	2
13	Guam	0	1	2	3
14	Cook Islands	0	0	1	1
14	Nauru	0	0	1	1
Totals (15 entries)		54	54	53	161

== Results summary ==
=== Men's results ===
Event	Gold		Silver		Bronze		Ref
100 m	Calab Law; Australia	10.40	Lachlan Kennedy; Australia	10.49	Johnny Key; Samoa	10.72	
200 m	Calab Law; Australia	20.60	Leroy Kamau; Papua New Guinea	21.24	Daniel Baul; Papua New Guinea	21.36 PB	
400 m	Benjamin Aliel; Papua New Guinea	47.17 PB	Daniel Baul; Papua New Guinea	47.21 PB	Emmanuel Wanga; Papua New Guinea	48.43	
800 m	Jack Lunn; Australia	1:48.43 GR	Jack Paine; New Zealand	1:51.72	Vishant Reddy; Fiji	1:51.80 PB	
1500 m	Jack Paine; New Zealand	3:50.97	Liam O'Donnell; New Zealand	3:56.61	Alex Beddoes; Cook Islands	3:56.88 NR	
5000 m	Yeshnil Karan; Fiji	15:14.89	Benjamin Zorgnotti; Tahiti	15:18.92	Siune Kagl; Papua New Guinea	15:30.02	
10,000 m	Yeshnil Karan; Fiji	32:32.30	Hugh Kent; Guam	33:48.60	Dilu Goiye; Papua New Guinea	33:57.08	
110 m hurdles	Mitchell Lightfoot; Australia	14.19 GR	Florient Girard; New Caledonia	14.61	Robert Oa; Papua New Guinea	14.81 PB	
400 m hurdles	Daniel Baul; Papua New Guinea	52.75	William Peka; Papua New Guinea	52.86	Sialis Passinghan; Papua New Guinea	54.37	
3000 m steeplechase	Yeshnil Karan; Fiji	9:18.48	Aquila Turalom; Papua New Guinea	9:26.10	Evueli Toia; Fiji	9:47.14	
4 × 100 m relay	Papua New Guinea; Emmanuel Anis; Daniel Baul; Pais Wisil; Leroy Kamau	40.59	Fiji; Ratu Penaia Ramasirai; Waisake Tewa; Jonacani Koroi; Joshua Daudravuni	40.97	Vanuatu; Toho Josuah; Tickie Terry Mael; Kieron Kapea Meake; Obediah Timbaci	42.05	
4 × 400 m relay	Papua New Guinea; Daniel Baul; Emmanuel Wanga; Leroy Kamau; Benjamin Aliel	3:13.53	Fiji; Sailasa Moala; Waisake Tewa; Vishant Reddy; Jonacani Koroi	3:15.80	Vanuatu; Tickie Mael; Obediah Timbaci; Toho Josuah; Rizon Rara	3:20.49	
Half marathon	Benjamin Zorgnotti; Tahiti	1:11:17.00	Siune Kagl; Papua New Guinea	1:11:34.00	Hugo Tormento; New Caledonia	1:11:53.00	
High jump	Rusiate Matai; Fiji	2.04 m	Mosese Foliaki; Tonga	2.02 m	Lataisi Mwea; Kiribati	1.90 m	
Pole vault	Matheo Lada; Tahiti	4.70 m	Eric Reuillard; New Caledonia	4.30 m	Vadim Strougar; New Caledonia	4.30 m	
Long jump	Raihau Maiau; Tahiti	7.44 m	Marvin Delaunay-Belleville; New Caledonia	6.96 m	Junior David; Solomon Islands	6.64 m	
Triple jump	Connor Murphy; Australia	16.85 m w	Penisoni Tirau; Fiji	14.47 m w	Ratu Ramanu Serunituacoko; Fiji	14.29 m w	
Shot put	Stephen Mailagi; Wallis and Futuna	17.63 m	Nathaniel Sulupo; Samoa	14.79 m	Jonathan-Deiwea Detageouwa; Nauru	14.68 m	
Discus throw	Stephen Mailagi; Wallis and Futuna	48.69 m	Tapuakitau Lakalaka; Wallis and Futuna	47.20 m	Nathaniel Sulupo; Samoa	46.72 m	
Hammer throw	Nils Poppe; New Caledonia	52.65 m	Maitoa Pito; Tahiti	45.93 m	Nathaniel Sulupo; Samoa	42.77 m	
Javelin Throw	Nash Lowis; Australia	74.40 m	Felise Sosaia; New Caledonia	71.96 m	Donny Tuimaseve; Samoa	69.84 m	
Decathlon	Karo Iga; Papua New Guinea	6761 pts =PB	Timona Poareu; Tahiti	6076 pts SB	Stephen Thorpe; New Zealand	5909 pts PB	

=== Women's results ===
Event	Gold		Silver		Bronze		Ref
100 m	Georgia Harris; Australia	11.70	Isila Apkup; Papua New Guinea	11.86	Regine Tugade-Watson; Guam	11.92	
200 m	Esther Wejieme; New Caledonia	23.83	Leonie Beu; Papua New Guinea	24.22	Regine Tugade-Watson; Guam	24.24 NR	
400 m	Ellie Beer; Australia	52.67	Camryn Smart; New Zealand	55.30	Leonie Beu; Papua New Guinea	56.42	
800 m	Tillie Hollyer; New Zealand	2:12.29	Peyton Leigh; New Zealand	2:13.79	Charlotte Michel; New Caledonia	2:14.73	
1500 m	Tillie Hollyer; New Zealand	4:26.06 GR	Peyton Leigh; New Zealand	4:39.53	Angele Richard; Tahiti	4:43.18	
5000 m	Nathania Tan; Northern Mariana Islands	18:08.69 GR	Scholastica Herman; Papua New Guinea	18:38.93	Deborah Kaboer; New Caledonia	19:03.46	
10,000 m	Nathania Tan; Northern Mariana Islands	39:45.62	Dianah Matekali; Solomon Islands	40:16.42	Deborah Kaboer; New Caledonia	40:50.30	
100 m hurdles	Imogen Breslin; Australia	13.81	Adrine Monagi; Papua New Guinea	14.29	Esther Wejieme; New Caledonia	14.39	
400 m hurdles	Loan Ville; New Caledonia	57.26	Isabelle Guthrie; Australia	57.77	Hereiti Bernardino; French Polynesia	1:04.02	
3000 m steeplechase	Amandine Matera; Tahiti	11:30.71	Lovelyn Kaba'a; Solomon Islands	12:08.49	Mary Tenge; Papua New Guinea	12:11.04	
4 × 100 m relay	Papua New Guinea; Adrine Monagi; Isila Apkup; Edna Boafob; Leonie Beu	46.10	New Caledonia; Ateliana Magoni; Loan Ville; Charlotte Michel; Esther Wejieme	47.82	Fiji; Domitila Naita; Kesaia Boletakanakavu; Melania Ranadi; Braelynn Yee	47.94	
4 × 400 m relay	Papua New Guinea; Isila Apkup; Edna Boafob; Adrine Monagi; Leonie Beu	3:49.11	New Caledonia; Esther Wejieme; Charlotte Michel; Ateliana Magoni; Loan Ville	3:53.73	New Zealand; Jordan Evans-Tobata; Peyton Leigh; Tillie Hollyer; Georgia Whiteman	3:57.17	
Half marathon	Salome De Barthez De Marmorieres; Tahiti	1:23:39.00	Dianah Matekali; Solomon Islands	1:24:23.00	Sharon Firisua; Solomon Islands	1:24:54.00	
High jump	Teanavai Perez; Tahiti	1.63 m	Rellie Kaputin; Papua New Guinea	1.60 m	Laisani Hacere; Fiji	1.60 m	
Pole vault	Pascale Gacon; New Caledonia	3.00 m	Julian Sosimo; Solomon Islands	2.10 m	Ateliana Magoni; New Caledonia	1.80 m	
Long jump	Samantha Dale; Australia	6.42 m	Katie Gunn; Australia	6.03 m	Rellie Kaputin; Papua New Guinea	5.89 m	
Triple jump	Desleigh Owusu; Australia	13.23 m	Lyza Malres; Vanuatu	12.04 m	Rellie Kaputin; Papua New Guinea	11.90 m	
Shot put	Nuuausala Tuilefano; Samoa	17.34 m GR	ʻAta Maama Tuutafaiva; Tonga	16.37 m	Lesly Filituulaga; New Caledonia	14.50 m	
Discus throw	Nuuausala Tuilefano; Samoa	49.07 m	Lesly Filituulaga; New Caledonia	47.49 m	Brieanna Rabakewa; Fiji	42.57 m	
Hammer throw	Deborah Bulai; Fiji	58.33 m	Elizabeth Hewitt; New Zealand	53.79 m	Aneymone Talalua; Wallis and Futuna	53.68 m	
Javelin Throw	Sharon Toako; Papua New Guinea	45.49 m	Lesly Filituulaga; New Caledonia	41.98 m	Stephany Sukeitaoha; Solomon Islands	39.35 m	
Heptathlon	Mia Scerri; Australia	5624 pts	Edna Boafob; Papua New Guinea	4606 pts	Timeri Lamorelle; Tahiti	4109 pts	

== Para-events ==
Men

Event	Gold		Silver		Bronze		Ref
100 m ambulant	Felicien Siapo (T/F44); New Caledonia	11.93 (92.20%)	Steven Abraham (T46); Papua New Guinea	11.63 (89.59%)	Tom Lulait (T/F13); New Caledonia	11.96 (87.45%)	
100 m wheelchair	Pierre Fairbank (T53); New Caledonia	17.08 (82.55%)	Moffet Tolomae (F57); Solomon Islands	23.55 (57.87%)	Christian Chee Ayee (F56); Tahiti	28.49 (47.84%)	
Shot put ambulant	Floyd Vari (F40); Solomon Islands	10.58 m (96.09%)	Soane Meissonnier (F20); Wallis and Futuna	15.39 m (89.01%)	Manako Aveuki (F44); Wallis and Futuna	11.95 m (75.96%)	
Shot put secured	Vitolio Kavakava (T54/F57); New Caledonia	12.58 m (82.43%)	Marcelin Walico (F57); New Caledonia	10.00 m (65.53%)	Morea Mararos (T/F34); Papua New Guinea	7.70 m (63.27%)	
Javelin throw ambulant	Soane Meissonnier (F20); Wallis and Futuna	48.08 m (84.58%)	Ken Kahu (T/F44); Vanuatu	53.29 m (80.52%)	Felicien Siapo (T/F44); New Caledonia	51.91 m (78.43%)	

Women

Event	Gold		Silver		Bronze		Ref
100 m ambulant	Rose Vanedou (T/F41); New Caledonia	18.70 (94.65%)	Jeminah Otoa (T47/F46); Solomon Islands	14.76 (80.55%)	Marcelline Moli (T/F46); Vanuatu	14.94 (79.58%)	
100 m wheelchair	Anna Pipisega (T53/F55); New Caledonia	25.23 (64.16%)	Noela Olo (T/F57); Solomon Islands	32.48 (47.25%)	Not awarded		
Shot put ambulant	Rose Vandegou (T/F41); New Caledonia	7.52 m (72.16%)	Rose Welepa (T/F41); New Caledonia	9.17 m (70.26%)	Naibili Vatunisolo (T/F41); Fiji	7.97 m (68.47%)	
Shot put secured	Elie Enock (F57); Vanuatu	7.84 m (70.25%)	Anna Pipisega (T53/F55); New Caledonia	5.77 m (63.68%)	Rose Lidia (T/F57); Solomon Islands	5.82 m (52.15%)	
Javelin throw ambulant	Rose Vandegou (T/F41); New Caledonia	25.45 m (88.67%)	Selina Seau (F64); Fiji	18.08 m (67.94%)	Naibili Vatunisolo (F42); Fiji	20.97 m (66.55%)	

== Doping ==
In December 2024, the Pacific Games Council confirmed that Tumatai Dauphin was stripped of the men's shot put silver medal for inadvertently doping. Medals were reallocated respectively.
