= Athletics at the 2022 Commonwealth Games – Men's 100 metres =

Men's 100 metres at the 2022 Commonwealth Games
- Venue: Alexander Stadium
- Dates: 2 August (heats); 3 August (semifinals and final)
- Competitors: 76 from 46 nations
- Winning time: 10.02

Medalists
gold medal	Ferdinand Omanyala	Kenya
silver medal	Akani Simbine	South Africa
bronze medal	Yupun Abeykoon	Sri Lanka

The men's 100 metres at the 2022 Commonwealth Games, as part of the athletics programme, took place at the Alexander Stadium from 2 and 3 August 2022.

Yupun Abeykoon won the bronze medal after finishing the race in 10.14 seconds. Abeykoon also became the first Sri Lankan to win a Commonwealth Games medal in athletics after 24 years since Sriyani Kulawansa and Sugath Thilakaratne's medal feats at the 1998 Commonwealth Games. Abeykoon also became the first Sri Lankan to win a Commonwealth Games medal in either men's and women's 100m event. During the heats, Abeykoon managed to set an all-time fastest ever timing in the heats, after finishing with a timing of 10.06 seconds. The previous record in 100m men's heats record was held by Canada's Glenroy Gilbert who had finished his heat with a timing of 10.10 seconds during the 1994 Commonwealth Games.

== Records ==
Prior to this competition, the existing world and Games records were as follows:

World record	Usain Bolt (JAM)	9.58	Berlin, Germany	16 August 2009
Commonwealth record	Usain Bolt (JAM)	9.58	Berlin, Germany	16 August 2009
Games record	Ato Boldon (TTO)	9.88	Kuala Lumpur, Malaysia	17 September 1998

== Schedule ==
The schedule is as follows:

Date	Time	Round
Tuesday 2 August 2022	10:40	First round
Wednesday 3 August 2022	19:10	Semifinals
Wednesday 3 August 2022	21:30	Final

All times are United Kingdom time (UTC+1)

== Results ==
=== First round ===
The first round consisted of ten heats. First 2 of each heat (Q) plus 7 fastest times (q) qualify to semi-finals.

==== Heat 1 ====
Place	Lane	Athlete	Nation	Time	Notes
1	5	Favour Ashe	Nigeria	10.12	Q
2	6	Nethaneel Mitchell-Blake	England	10.14	Q
3	4	Nadale Budin	Saint Kitts and Nevis	10.37	q, SB
4	2	Malachi Murray	Canada	10.47	
5	1	Banuve Tabakaucoro	Fiji	10.64	
6	7	Leroy Kamau	Papua New Guinea	10.68	PB
7	8	Davin Fleming	Anguilla	11.09	SB
8	3	Wilkinson Fenelon	Turks and Caicos Islands	11.13	SB
				Wind: (−0.5 m/s)	

==== Heat 2 ====
Place	Lane	Athlete	Nation	Time	Notes
1	6	Akani Simbine	South Africa	10.10	Q
2	4	Jake Doran	Australia	10.39	Q
3	3	Nigel Ellis	Jamaica	10.41	
4	5	Mojela Koneshe	Lesotho	10.46	
5	7	Johnny Key	Samoa	10.98	
6	2	Johmari Lee	Montserrat	11.03	PB
7	8	Terrone Webster	Anguilla	11.13	PB
				Wind: (+0.1 m/s)	

==== Heat 3 ====
Place	Lane	Athlete	Nation	Time	Notes
1	2	Ojie Edoburun	England	10.27	Q
2	4	Rikkoi Brathwaite	British Virgin Islands	10.28	Q, =PB
3	1	Delan Adwin	Saint Lucia	10.42	
4	7	Julius Morris	Montserrat	10.56	
5	5	Zachary Saunders	Jersey	10.76	SB
6	6	Karalo Maibuca	Tuvalu	11.39	PB
—	8	Sharry Dodin	Seychelles	DNS	
—	3	Terrence Jones	Bahamas	DNS	
				Wind: (+0.6 m/s)	

==== Heat 4 ====
Place	Lane	Athlete	Nation	Time	Notes
1	5	Raymond Ekevwo	Nigeria	10.14	Q
2	6	Kemar Bailey-Cole	Jamaica	10.15	Q
3	1	Stern Liffa	Malawi	10.49	
4	3	Dylan Sicobo	Seychelles	10.74	
5	8	Courtney Missick	Turks and Caicos Islands	10.87	
6	7	Jireh Agege	Nauru	11.08	PB
—	2	Raphael Ngaguele Mberlina	Cameroon	DQ	TR 16.8
—	4	Paul Ma'Unikeni	Solomon Islands	DNS	
				Wind: (−1.0 m/s)	

==== Heat 5 ====
Place	Lane	Athlete	Nation	Time	Notes
1	8	Ferdinand Omanyala	Kenya	10.07	Q
2	5	Emmanuel Eseme	Cameroon	10.08	Q, PB
3	3	Gilbert Hainuca	Namibia	10.31	q
4	2	Noelex Holder	Guyana	10.50	
5	4	Sean Crowie	Saint Helena	10.74	PB
6	7	Ronald Fotofili	Tonga	10.80	PB
7	6	Ian Koe	Singapore	10.91	
				Wind: (+0.9 m/s)	

==== Heat 6 ====
Place	Lane	Athlete	Nation	Time	Notes
1	5	Yupun Abeykoon	Sri Lanka	10.06	Q
2	6	Kion Benjamin	Trinidad and Tobago	10.34	Q
3	1	Godson Oghenebrume	Nigeria	10.36	q
4	7	McKish Compton	Saint Vincent and the Grenadines	10.62	
5	4	William Hunt	Samoa	10.70	PB
6	2	Denzel Adem	Seychelles	10.70	PB
—	3	Ayanda Malaza	Eswatini	DNF	
				Wind: (+1.1 m/s)	

==== Heat 7 ====
Place	Lane	Athlete	Nation	Time	Notes
1	2	Benjamin Azamati	Ghana	10.19	Q
2	3	Jeremiah Azu	Wales	10.35	Q
3	8	Imranur Rahman	Bangladesh	10.46	
4	1	Marc Brian Louis	Singapore	10.51	
5	4	Lwazi Msibi	Eswatini	10.83	PB
6	7	Brandon Jones	Belize	10.91	
7	6	Aiden Yon-Stevens	Saint Helena	11.90	PB
				Wind: (+0.4 m/s)	

==== Heat 8 ====
Place	Lane	Athlete	Nation	Time	Notes
1	6	Conroy Jones	Jamaica	10.28	Q
2	3	Adam Thomas	Scotland	10.30	Q
3	2	Eric Harrison Jr	Trinidad and Tobago	10.37	q
4	4	Shajar Abbas	Pakistan	10.38	=PB
5	7	Hassan Saaid	Maldives	10.75	SB
6	5	Shaun Gill	Belize	10.76	
7	8	Julius Morie	Sierra Leone	10.88	PB
8	1	Craig Gill	Gibraltar	11.09	PB
				Wind: (+1.0 m/s)	

==== Heat 9 ====
Place	Lane	Athlete	Nation	Time	Notes
1	2	Rohan Browning	Australia	10.10	Q
2	7	Samwel Imeta	Kenya	10.12	Q, PB
3	1	Cejhae Greene	Antigua and Barbuda	10.16	q
4	8	Akeem Stewart	Guyana	10.46	
5	6	Joe Chadwick	Guernsey	10.60	PB
6	4	Joshua Chua	Singapore	10.67	
7	3	Javon Rawlins	Saint Vincent and the Grenadines	10.79	
8	5	Lataisi Mwea	Kiribati	11.33	
				Wind: (+0.9 m/s)	

==== Heat 10 ====
Place	Lane	Athlete	Nation	Time	Notes
1	3	Jerod Elcock	Trinidad and Tobago	10.26	Q
2	8	Emanuel Archibald	Guyana	10.28	Q
3	4	Stephan Charles	Saint Lucia	10.29	q
4	6	Sean Safo-Antwi	Ghana	10.33	q
5	7	Ibrahim Bangura	Sierra Leone	10.51	
6	5	Tevique Benjamin	Montserrat	11.06	
7	1	Pesamino Iakopo	Samoa	11.29	
—	2	Kemar Hyman	Cayman Islands	DNS	
				Wind: (+2.9 m/s)	

=== Semi-finals ===
First 2 of each heat (Q) plus 2 fastest times (q) qualify to the final.

==== Heat 1 ====
Place	Lane	Athlete	Nation	Time	Notes
1	4	Akani Simbine	South Africa	10.07	Q
2	7	Rohan Browning	Australia	10.17	Q
3	5	Ojie Edoburun	England	10.30	
4	9	Rikkoi Brathwaite	British Virgin Islands	10.31	
5	6	Conroy Jones	Jamaica	10.33	
6	8	Emanuel Archibald	Guyana	10.43	
7	2	Eric Harrison Jr	Trinidad and Tobago	10.44	
8	3	Cejhae Greene	Antigua and Barbuda	10.45	
9	1	Godson Oghenebrume	Nigeria	10.52	
				Wind: (−0.2 m/s)	

==== Heat 2 ====
Place	Lane	Athlete	Nation	Time	Notes
1	5	Ferdinand Omanyala	Kenya	10.02	Q
2	6	Emmanuel Eseme	Cameroon	10.14	Q
3	7	Kemar Bailey-Cole	Jamaica	10.24	
4	9	Favour Ashe	Nigeria	10.25	
5	2	Sean Safo-Antwi	Ghana	10.36	
6	4	Jerod Elcock	Trinidad and Tobago	10.38	
7	8	Adam Thomas	Scotland	10.40	
8	3	Jake Doran	Australia	10.40	
9	1	Nadale Budin	Saint Kitts and Nevis	10.51	
				Wind: (−1.2 m/s)	

==== Heat 3 ====
Place	Lane	Athlete	Nation	Time	Notes
1	8	Nethaneel Mitchell-Blake	England	10.13	Q
2	1	Jeremiah Azu	Wales	10.15	Q, PB
3	6	Benjamin Azamati	Ghana	10.18	q
4	7	Yupun Abeykoon	Sri Lanka	10.20	q
5	4	Samwel Imeta	Kenya	10.24	
6	2	Gilbert Hainuca	Namibia	10.29	
7	5	Raymond Ekevwo	Nigeria	10.36	
8	9	Kion Benjamin	Trinidad and Tobago	10.43	
9	3	Stephan Charles	Saint Lucia	10.53	PB
				Wind: (+0.4 m/s)	

=== Final ===
Place	Lane	Athlete	Nation	Time	Notes
1st place, gold medalist(s)	3	Ferdinand Omanyala	Kenya	10.02	
2nd place, silver medalist(s)	4	Akani Simbine	South Africa	10.13	
3rd place, bronze medalist(s)	2	Yupun Abeykoon	Sri Lanka	10.14	
4	1	Benjamin Azamati	Ghana	10.16	
5	7	Jeremiah Azu	Wales	10.19	
6	8	Rohan Browning	Australia	10.20	
7	5	Emmanuel Eseme	Cameroon	10.24	
8	6	Nethaneel Mitchell-Blake	England	11.10	
				Wind: (−0.9 m/s)	
