= Jireh Westerlund =

Samoan athlete

Sport
- Country: Samoa
- Sport: Athletics
Medal record
Men's Athletics
Representing Samoa
Pacific Mini Games
Bronze medal – third place	2022 Saipan	110m hurdles
Bronze medal – third place	2022 Saipan	400m hurdles
Bronze medal – third place	2022 Saipan	4x400m relay

Jireh Otto Micky Westerlund (born 8 August 2002) is a Samoan athlete who has represented Samoa at the Pacific Mini Games.

Westerlund is from Taufusi and Lalovaea and was educated at St. Joseph's College. In August 2021 he was awarded the Most Valuable Player at the annual Champion of Champions school athletics competition.

At the 2022 Pacific Mini Games in Saipan, Northern Mariana Islands he won bronze in the 110 metres hurdles, 400 metres hurdles, and 4 × 400 metres relay.
