= Athletics at the 2022 Commonwealth Games – Men's javelin throw =

Men's javelin throw at the 2022 Commonwealth Games
- Dates: 7 August 2022
- Competitors: 13 from 11 nations
- Winning distance: 90.18 m GR NR

Medalists
gold medal	Arshad Nadeem	Pakistan
silver medal	Anderson Peters	Grenada
bronze medal	Julius Yego	Kenya

The men's javelin throw at the 2022 Commonwealth Games as part of the athletics programme, took place at the Alexander Stadium on the 7th of August 2022

Pakistan's Arshad Nadeem won the gold medal throwing 90.18m setting a new games record.

== Records ==
Prior to this competition, the existing world and Games records were as follows:

World record	Jan Železný (CZE)	98.48 m	Jena, Germany	25 May 1996
Games record	Marius Corbett (RSA)	88.75 m	Kuala Lumpur, Malaysia	21 September 1998

== Schedule ==
The schedule was as follows:

Date	Time	Round
Sunday 7 August 2022	19:40	Final

All times are British Summer Time (UTC+1)

== Results ==
=== Final ===
The medals were determined in the final.

Rank	Name	#1	#2	#3	#4	#5	#6	Result	Notes
1st place, gold medalist(s)	Arshad Nadeem (PAK)	86.61	x	88.00	85.09	90.18	81.29	90.18	GR, NR
2nd place, silver medalist(s)	Anderson Peters (GRN)	82.30	82.74	81.02	78.95	88.64	85.50	88.64	
3rd place, bronze medalist(s)	Julius Yego (KEN)	85.70	x	x	x	x	82.68	85.70	SB
4	Keshorn Walcott (TTO)	82.61	80.70	79.22	79.22	82.33	x	82.61	
5	D. P. Manu (IND)	79.04	82.28	78.79	x	78.72	78.72	82.28	
6	Rohit Yadav (IND)	80.66	77.74	78.73	80.80	79.41	82.22	82.22	
7	Cameron Mcentyre (AUS)	76.51	x	x	79.89	75.02	x	79.89	
8	Alex Kiprotich (KEN)	x	77.93	x	x	–	70.61	77.93	
9	Chinecherem Nnamdi (NGR)	76.46	76.20	75.25				76.46	
10	Sumeda Ranasinghe (SRI)	69.22	70.22	70.45				70.22	
11	Joe Harris (IOM)	64.79	63.54	67.91				67.91	
12	Lakona Gerega (PNG)	x	x	63.46				63.46	
13	Donny Tuimaseve (SAM)	60.30	56.34	63.14				63.14	
