= 2017 Oceania Athletics Championships =

XVI Oceania Athletics Championships
- Dates: June 28 – July 1
- Host city: Suva, Fiji
- Venue: ANZ Stadium
- Level: Senior
- Events: 43
- Participation: 21 + 1 nations
- Records set: 6

The 2017 Oceania Athletics Championships were held at the ANZ Stadium in Suva, Fiji between June 28 and July 1, 2017. The event was held jointly with the Oceania under 18 and under 20 championships, including exhibition events for masters and for athletes with disabilities (parasports).

== Participating nations (Unofficial) ==
A total of 22 teams participated in the senior championships. There were 21 nations with 1 regional team from Australia. The regional Australian team (RAT) competed separately and not as Australia.

- American Samoa (3)
- Australia (37)
  - (Northern Territory) / (Queensland) Northern Australia (11)
- Cook Islands (6)
- Federated States of Micronesia (5)
- Fiji (Host) (42)
- French Polynesia (1)
- Guam (8)
- Kiribati (2)
- Marshall Islands (2)
- Nauru (6)
- New Caledonia (12)
- New Zealand (15)
- Norfolk Island (1)
- Northern Mariana Islands (1)
- Palau (1)
- Papua New Guinea (29)
- Samoa (17)
- Solomon Islands (9)
- Tonga (8)
- Tuvalu (5)
- Vanuatu (5)

== Medal table (Unofficial) ==
* Host nation (Fiji)

Rank	Nation	Gold	Silver	Bronze	Total
1	Australia	11	14	8	33
2	Papua New Guinea	10	12	7	29
3	Fiji*	8	6	7	21
4	New Zealand	6	2	4	12
5	Samoa	3	0	2	5
6	New Caledonia	2	1	3	6
7	Solomon Islands	1	3	1	5
8	(Northern Territory) / (Queensland) Northern Australia	1	0	2	3
9	American Samoa	1	0	0	1
10	Tonga	0	1	2	3
11	Cook Islands	0	1	1	2
12	French Polynesia	0	0	1	1
Totals (12 entries)		43	40	38	121

== Medal summary ==
A total of 47 events were originally scheduled for the championships, however, 3 events for women were cancelled due to no entries, while medals for the men's 5000m race walk were never distributed because of both entries disqualified. Resulting in a total of 43 medal events.

Complete results can be found on the Oceania Athletics Association webpage.

=== Men ===
Event	Gold		Silver		Bronze	
100 metres (wind: -2.4 m/s)	Jeremy Dodson; Samoa	10.86	Nazmie-Lee Marai; Papua New Guinea	10.88	Jonty Flottmann; Australia	10.99
200 metres (wind: -1.3 m/s)	Jeremy Dodson; Samoa	20.80	Nazmie-Lee Marai; Papua New Guinea	21.64	Wesley Logorava; Papua New Guinea	21.77
400 metres	Murray Goodwin; Australia	47.53	Samuela Railoa; Fiji	48.16	Theo Piniau; Papua New Guinea	48.49
800 metres	Alain Dutton; Australia	1:56.06	Martin Orovo; Papua New Guinea	1:57.21	Alex Beddoes; Cook Islands	2:01.46
1500 metres	Alain Dutton; Australia	4:16.20	George Yamak; Papua New Guinea	4:17.28	Martin Orovo; Papua New Guinea	4:21.71
5000 metres	Simbai Kaspar; Papua New Guinea	15:50.25	Patrick Kam; Solomon Islands	16:04.12	Liam Woollett; Australia	16:09.59
10,000 metres	Avikash Lal; Fiji	33:16.04	Patrick Kam; Solomon Islands	33:46.88	Simbai Kaspar; Papua New Guinea	33:56.83
5000 metres race walk	All competitors disqualified					
10,000 metres race walk	Pramesh Prasad; Fiji	1:06:53.42				
110 metres hurdles (wind: -2.2 m/s)	Terrell Mckenzie; Australia	14.77	Talatala Po'oi; Tonga	15.51	Kolone Alefosio; Samoa	15.78
400 metres hurdles	Ephraim Lerkin; Papua New Guinea	51.71	Mowen Boino; Papua New Guinea	53.57	Harrison Roubin; Australia	54.25
3000 metres steeplechase	Atama Vunibola; Fiji	11:15.27				
4 × 100 metres relay	Australia; Sam Toleman; Jonty Flottmann; Terrell McKenzie; Nicholas Bate	41.51	Papua New Guinea; Nelson Stone; Nazmie-Lee Marai; Wesley Logorava; Charles Livuan	41.87	Samoa; Shu Peng Ah Vui; Quinton Dodson; Joseph Paletasala; Jeremy Dodson	41.88
4 × 400 metres relay	Fiji; Emosi Sukanaivalu; Kameli Sauduadua; Sailosi Tubuilagi; Samuela Railoa	3:17.83	Papua New Guinea; Emmanuel Wanga; Peniel Joshua; Ephraim Lerkin; Kaminiel Matlaun	3:18.30	Tonga; Heamatangi Tuivai; Fine Tokai; Larry Sulunga; Ronald Fotof	3:22.40
High jump	Malakai Kaiwalu; Fiji	2.04m	Sebastian Gray; Australia	1.98m	Meli Kolanavanua; Fiji	1.90m
Pole vault	Caihe Caihe; New Caledonia	3.80m				
Long jump	Isireli Bulivorovoro; Fiji	7.28m w(wind: +2.6 m/s)	Sam Toleman; Australia	7.14 w (wind: +3.4 m/s)	Waisale Dausoko; Fiji	7.00m (wind: +0.9 m/s)
Triple jump	Peniel Richard; Papua New Guinea	14.56m (wind: -1.3 m/s)	Kalaveti Mokosiro; Fiji	13.66m (wind: +0.0 m/s)	Andrew Allan; New Zealand	13.30m (wind: +0.3 m/s)
Shot put	Mustafa Fall; Fiji	15.68m	Debono Paraka; Papua New Guinea	15.64m	Jean Vehikite; New Caledonia	13.10m
Discus throw	Alexander Rose; Samoa	61.12m CR	Mustafa Fall; Fiji	45.86m	Debono Paraka; Papua New Guinea	44.40m
Hammer throw	Ram Abhineet; Fiji	55.17m	Debono Paraka; Papua New Guinea	39.45m		
Javelin throw	Ben Burnell; New Zealand	78.10m CR	Alex Wood; New Zealand	65.79m	Pita Tamani; Fiji	65.10m
Decathlon	Max Attwell; New Zealand	6975 pts	Martin Clark; Australia	6171 pts	Matthew Wecker; Australia	6031 pts

=== Women ===
Event	Gold		Silver		Bronze	
100 metres (wind: -2.3 m/s)	Toea Wisil; Papua New Guinea	11.63	Morgan Gaffney; Australia	12.24	Jessica Peris; Australia	12.27
200 metres (wind: +0.4 m/s)	Toea Wisil; Papua New Guinea	23.24 CR	Larissa Pasternatsky; Australia	23.56	Jessica Peris; Australia	24.06
400 metres	Jessica Haig; Australia	57.70	Shirley Vunatup; Papua New Guinea	58.35	Elenani Tinai; Fiji	58.70
800 metres	Keely Waters; Australia	2:12.49	Tia Brady; Australia	2:13.38	Poro Gahekave; Papua New Guinea	2:20.71
1500 metres	Hannah Miller; New Zealand	4:36.07	Audrey Hall; Australia	4:43.54	Poro Gahekave; Papua New Guinea	4:47.26
5000 metres	Hannah Miller; New Zealand	17:08.47	Audrey Hall; Australia	17:29.15	Sharon Firisua; Solomon Islands	18:08.05
10,000 metres	Sharon Firisua; Solomon Islands	37:54.60 CR	Dianah Matekali; Solomon Islands	39:47.00	Sophie Bouchonnet; French Polynesia	39:56.76
5000 metres race walk	Cancelled due to no entries					
10,000 metres race walk	Cancelled due to no entries					
100 metres hurdles (wind: -2.2 m/s)	Ashleigh Sando; New Zealand	14.37	Summer Johnson; Australia	14.57	Carla Takchi; Australia	14.82
400 metres hurdles	Raylyne Kanam; Papua New Guinea	1:05.40	Trudy Davidson; Australia	1:07.35	Ariana Blackwood; New Zealand	1:07.96
3000 metres steeplechase	Cancelled due to no entries					
4 × 100 metres relay	Australia; Summer Johnson; Jessica Peris; Morgan Gaffney; Larissa Pasternatsky	46.26	Fiji; Laisani Moceisawana; Makereta Naulu; Elenoa Sailosi; Younis Bese	47.88	(Northern Territory) / (Queensland) Northern Australia; Mikielee Snow; Emily Dixon; Natasha Rudder; Kayla Montagner	49.07
4 × 400 metres relay	Australia; Tia Brady; Trudy Davidson; Hannah Cox; Jessica Haig	3:56.86	Papua New Guinea; Shirley Vunatup; Nancy Malamut; Leonie Beu; Raylyne Kanam	4:05.11	Fiji; Maria Noela; Elenani Tinai; Tavenisa Senigacali; Filomena Balobalo	4:19.87
High jump	Rellie Kaputin; Papua New Guinea	1.65m	Rosalia Raqato; Fiji	1.56m	Nanise Tavisa; Fiji	1.53m
Pole vault	Jamie Scroop; Australia	4.00m CR	Katherine Iannello; Australia	3.60m		
Long jump	Rellie Kaputin; Papua New Guinea	5.86m (wind: -1.1 m/s)	Jessie Harper; Australia	5.75m (wind: -1.1 m/s)	Ashleigh Sando; New Zealand	5.66m (wind: +0.7 m/s)
Triple jump	Rellie Kaputin; Papua New Guinea	13.05m CR (wind: +1.6 m/s)	Allison Nankivell; Australia	12.91m w (wind: +2.2 m/s)	Anna Thomson; New Zealand	12.51m (wind: +1.8 m/s)
Shot put	Maddison-Lee Wesche; New Zealand	15.27m	Ashley Bologna; New Caledonia	14.68m	ʻAta Maama Tuutafaiva; Tonga	14.07m
Discus throw	Patria Vaimaona; American Samoa	45.48m	Tereapii Tapoki; Cook Islands	44.83m	Falakika Fakate; New Caledonia	41.68m
Hammer throw	Mikayla Horan (Northern Territory) / (Queensland) Northern Australia	46.63m	Emma Werner; Australia	44.80m	Coranne Truques; New Caledonia	43.72m
Javelin throw	Linda Selui; New Caledonia	47.29m	Sharon Toako; Papua New Guinea	43.54m	Elena Caucau; Fiji	40.27m
Heptathlon	Adrine Monagi; Papua New Guinea	4639 pts	Ariana Backwood; New Zealand	4369 pts	Vicky Clark; Australia	4136 pts

=== Mixed ===
Event	Gold		Silver		Bronze	
Mixed 800m sprint medley relay	Australia; Carla Takchi; Jordan Shelley; Jessica Payne; Murray Goodwin	1:33.94	Fiji; Laisani Moceisawana; Aaron Powell; Makereta Naulu; Samuela Railoa	1:35.78	(Northern Territory) / (Queensland) Northern Australia; Emily Dixon; Jaqson Dagan; Kayla Montagner; Jay Stone	1:38.76
