= Athletics at the 2022 Commonwealth Games – Men's 400 metres hurdles =

Men's 400 metres hurdles at the 2022 Commonwealth Games
- Venue: Alexander Stadium
- Dates: 2 August (first round); 6 August (final)
- Competitors: 13 from 10 nations
- Winning time: 48.93

Medalists
gold medal	Kyron McMaster	British Virgin Islands
silver medal	Jaheel Hyde	Jamaica
bronze medal	Alastair Chalmers	Guernsey

The men's 400 metres hurdles at the 2022 Commonwealth Games, as part of the athletics programme, took place in the Alexander Stadium on 2 and 6 August 2022.

== Records ==
Prior to this competition, the existing world and Games records were as follows:

World record	Karsten Warholm (NOR)	45.94	Tokyo, Japan	3 August 2021
Commonwealth record	Samuel Matete (ZAM)	47.10	Zürich, Switzerland	7 August 1991
Games record	L. J. van Zyl (RSA)	48.05	Melbourne, Australia	23 March 2006

== Schedule ==
The schedule was as follows:

Date	Time	Round
Tuesday 2 August 2022	19:10	First round
Saturday 6 August 2022	20:45	Final

All times are British Summer Time (UTC+1)

== Results ==
=== First round ===
The first round consisted of two heats. The three fastest competitors per heat (plus two fastest non-automatic qualifiers) advanced to the final.

Rank	Heat	Lane	Name	Result	Notes
1	2	5	Jaheel Hyde (JAM)	49.60	Q
2	2	8	Kyron McMaster (IVB)	49.78	Q
3	2	6	William Mbevi Mutunga (KEN)	49.99	Q, SB
4	1	8	Wiseman Mukhobe (KEN)	50.03	Q
5	1	7	Ezekiel Nathaniel (NGR)	50.38	Q
6	2	9	Alastair Chalmers (GGY)	50.39	q
7	2	2	Ned Azemia (SEY)	51.27	q
8	1	6	Malik Metivier (CAN)	51.54	Q
9	1	5	Andre Retief (NAM)	51.73	
10	2	3	Calvin Quek (SGP)	52.40	
11	2	7	Ephraim Lerkin (PNG)	52.43	SB
12	1	3	Peter Curtis (GGY)	52.57	
	1	9	Daniel Baul (PNG)	DNF	

=== Final ===
The medals were determined in the final.

Rank	Lane	Name	Result	Notes
1st place, gold medalist(s)	7	Kyron McMaster (IVB)	48.93	
2nd place, silver medalist(s)	5	Jaheel Hyde (JAM)	49.78	
3rd place, bronze medalist(s)	2	Alastair Chalmers (GGY)	49.97	
3	6	Wiseman Mukhobe (KEN)	50.27	
5	9	William Mbevi Mutunga (KEN)	50.60	
6	4	Ezekiel Nathaniel (NGR)	51.38	
7	3	Ned Azemia (SEY)	51.71	
	8	Malik Metivier (CAN)	DQ	TR 16.8
