= Athletics at the 2022 Pacific Mini Games =

- Dates: 21 – 25 June
- Host city: Saipan, Northern Mariana Islands
- Venue: Oleai Sports Complex - Track and field
- Events: 49
- Participation: 329 athletes from 18 nations

The athletics competition at the 2022 Pacific Mini Games was held between 21 and 25 June 2022 at the Oleai Sports Complex in Saipan, Northern Mariana Islands. Seven para-events were also staged at these games, (four for men and three for women).

== Participating nations ==
As of 1 June 2022, eighteen countries and territories have confirmed their participation in the athletics program for the games.

Pacific Games Associations
- American Samoa ()
- Australia ()
- Cook Islands ()
- Federated States of Micronesia ()
- Fiji ()
- Guam ()
- Kiribati ()
- Nauru ()
- New Caledonia ()
- Northern Mariana Islands () (Host)
- Palau ()
- Papua New Guinea (38)
- Samoa ()
- Solomon Islands ()
- Tahiti ()
- Tonga ()
- Tuvalu ()
- Vanuatu ()

== Medal table ==
* Host nation (Northern Mariana Islands)

Rank	Nation	Gold	Silver	Bronze	Total
1	Papua New Guinea	23	23	16	62
2	Fiji	8	2	3	13
3	Australia	5	2	3	10
4	New Caledonia	4	7	9	20
5	French Polynesia	3	6	2	11
6	Solomon Islands	2	5	4	11
7	Samoa	2	2	4	8
8	Guam	1	0	1	2
8	Tonga	1	0	1	2
10	Northern Mariana Islands*	0	2	2	4
11	Kiribati	0	0	1	1
11	Vanuatu	0	0	1	1
Totals (12 entries)		49	49	47	145

Last updated: 24 June 2022 at 09:54:11pm (GMT+10).

== Events summary ==
=== Men's ===
Event	Gold		Silver		Bronze	
100 metres wind: 0.0 m/s	Banuve Tabakaucoro; Fiji	10.56	Pesamino Iakopo; Samoa	10.76	Johnny Key; Samoa	10.78
200 metres wind: -1.6 m/s	Banuve Tabakaucoro; Fiji	21.11	Leroy Kamau; Papua New Guinea	21.48	Terence Talio; Papua New Guinea	21.55
400 metres	Shadrick Tansi; Papua New Guinea	47.90	Emmanuel Wanga; Papua New Guinea	48.18	Samuela Railoa; Fiji	48.59
800 metres	Adolf Kauba; Papua New Guinea	1:56.03	Ephraim Lerkin; Papua New Guinea	1:56.81	Jeremiah N'Godrela; New Caledonia	1:57.17
1500 metres	Yeshnil Karan; Fiji	3:59.79	George Yamak; Papua New Guinea	4:07.84	Aquila Turalom; Papua New Guinea	4:07.95
5000 metres	Benjamin Zorgnotti; French Polynesia	15:35.39	Siune Kagl; Papua New Guinea	15:36.66	Yeshnil Karan; Fiji	15:37.15
10,000 metres	Dilu Goiye; Papua New Guinea	33:04.04	Siune Kagl; Papua New Guinea	33:20.44	Simon Charley; Vanuatu	34:51.53
110 metres hurdles wind: -1.1 m/s	Kolone Alefosio; Samoa	14.82	Daniel Baul; Papua New Guinea	15.44	Jireh Westerlund; Samoa	15.68
400 metres hurdles	Daniel Baul; Papua New Guinea	52.33	Ephraim Lerkin; Papua New Guinea	52.81	Jireh Westerlund; Samoa	57.17
3000 metres steeplechase	Israel Takap; Papua New Guinea	9:45.73	Aquila Turalom; Papua New Guinea	9:46.99	Abel Siune; Papua New Guinea	10:01.75
4×100 metres relay	Fiji; Tony Lemeki; Samuela Railoa; Lasarusa Senibale; Banuve Tabakaucoro	41.17	Samoa; Kolone Alefosio; Livingstonerick Savaiinaea; Johnny Key; William Hunt	41.55	Papua New Guinea; Pais Wisil; Leroy Kamau; Terence Talio; Emmanuel Anis	41.77
4×400 metres relay	Papua New Guinea; Leroy Kamau; Jonathan Dende; Daniel Baul; Shadrick Tansi	3:15.35	Fiji; Tony Lemeki; Banuve Tabakaucoro; Lasarusa Senibale; Samuela Railoa	3:24.44	Samoa; Jireh Westerlund; Johnny Key; Livingstonerick Savaiinaea; Kolone Alefosio	3:30.71
Half marathon	Benjamin Zorgnotti; French Polynesia	1:15.06	Damien Troquenet; French Polynesia	1:15.15	Siune Kagl; Papua New Guinea	1:15.58
High jump	Malakai Kaiwalu; Fiji	2.00 m	Karo Iga; Papua New Guinea	1.97 m	Peniel Richard; Papua New Guinea	1.90 m
Long jump	Marvin Delaunay-Belleville; New Caledonia	7.19 m wind: +0.3 m/s	Peniel Richard; Papua New Guinea	6.96 m wind: +2.1 m/s	Roland Hure; Papua New Guinea	6.92 m wind: +1.1 m/s
Triple jump	Finn Murphy; Australia	14.89 m wind: +0.9 m/s	Ulric Buama; New Caledonia	14.71 m wind: +1.0 m/s	Peniel Richard; Papua New Guinea	14.34 m wind: +0.3 m/s
Shotput	Tumatai Dauphin; French Polynesia	15.55 m	De'bono Paraka; Papua New Guinea	13.64 m	Dennis Borja; Northern Mariana Islands	12.08 m
Discus throw	De'bono Paraka; Papua New Guinea	51.02 m	Jackson Mellor; Australia	38.40 m	Kaota Ribabaiti; Kiribati	35.19 m
Hammer throw	Benjamin Roberts; Australia	58.61 m	De'bono Paraka; Papua New Guinea	34.93 m	Tumatai Dauphin; French Polynesia	34.63 m
Javelin throw	Donny Tuimaseve; Samoa	69.05 m	Lakona Gerega; Papua New Guinea	66.39 m	Caihe Caihe; New Caledonia	62.47 m
Octathlon	Karo Iga; Papua New Guinea	5,382 pts	Orrin Pharmin; Northern Mariana Islands	3,093 pts		

=== Women's ===
Event	Gold		Silver		Bronze	
100 metres wind: -1.6 m/s	Toea Wisil; Papua New Guinea	11.98	Isila Apkup; Papua New Guinea	12.07	Leonie Beu; Papua New Guinea	12.13
200 metres wind: -2.6 m/s	Toea Wisil; Papua New Guinea	24.23	Leonie Beu; Papua New Guinea	24.44	Isila Apkup; Papua New Guinea	24.49
400 metres	Leonie Beu; Papua New Guinea	55.91	Loan Ville; New Caledonia	56.47	Isila Apkup; Papua New Guinea	57.55
800 metres	Scholastica Herman; Papua New Guinea	2:18.26	Estelle Gentilly; French Polynesia	2:25.25	Charlotte Michel; New Caledonia	2:26.67
1500 metres	Scholastica Herman; Papua New Guinea	5:02.39	Estelle Gentilly; French Polynesia	5:08.78	Mary Kua; Papua New Guinea	5:09.51
5000 metres	Dianah Matekali; Solomon Islands	19:30.19	Mary Tenge; Papua New Guinea	19:37.43	Scholastica Herman; Papua New Guinea	19:54.11
10,000 metres	Dianah Matekali; Solomon Islands	40:16.78	Sharon Firisua; Solomon Islands	41:50.81	Isabelle Oblet; New Caledonia	43:08.78
100 metres hurdles wind: -3.2 m/s	Adrine Monagi; Papua New Guinea	14.15	Esther Wejieme; New Caledonia	14.64	Tayden Tomich; Australia	15.41
400 metres hurdles	Loan Ville; New Caledonia	1:02.02	Annie Topal; Papua New Guinea	1:09.80	Lucie Turpin; New Caledonia	1:10.43
3000 metres steeplechase	Mary Tenge; Papua New Guinea	11:50.24	Denise Myers; Northern Mariana Islands	12:18.79	Sharon Firisua; Solomon Islands	12:38.78
4×100 metres relay	Papua New Guinea; Adrine Monagi; Toea Wisil; Isila Apkup; Leonie Beu	45.85	New Caledonia; Ateliana Magoni; Loan Ville; Manuella Gavin; Esther Wejieme	48.50	Northern Mariana Islands; Casey Cruz; Maria Quitugua; Kina Rangamar; Zarinae Sapong	53.98
4×400 metres relay	Papua New Guinea; Leonie Beu; Isila Apkup; Toea Wisil; Edna Boafob	3:52.76	New Caledonia; Ateliana Magoni; Charlotte Michel; Esther Wejieme; Loan Ville	4:05.71	Australia; Tayden Tomich; Rebecca Bain; Monique Hanlon; Claire Roberts	4:19.45
Half marathon	Manami Iijima; Guam	1:27.48	Sharon Firisua; Solomon Islands	1:28.33	Dianah Matekali; Solomon Islands	1:32.12
High jump	Rellie Kaputin; Papua New Guinea	1.62 m	Shawntelle Lockington; Fiji	1.59 m	Lucie Turpin; New Caledonia	1.40 m
Long jump	Annie Topal; Papua New Guinea	6.03 m wind: +2.3 m/s	Rellie Kaputin; Papua New Guinea	5.94 m wind: +1.5 m/s	Claire Roberts; Australia	5.60 m wind: +0.6 m/s
Triple jump	Annie Topal; Papua New Guinea	12.73 m wind: +4.6 m/s	Rellie Kaputin; Papua New Guinea	12.40 m wind: +4.0 m/s	Manuella Gavin; New Caledonia	11.98 m wind: +2.8 m/s
Shotput	ʻAta Maama Tuutafaiva; Tonga	15.60 m	Vaihina Doucet; French Polynesia	13.18 m	Loveleina Wong-Sang; French Polynesia	12.32 m
Discus throw	Charlize Goody; Australia	43.58 m	Loveleina Wong-Sang; French Polynesia	37.59 m	ʻAta Maama Tuutafaiva; Tonga	37.02 m
Hammer throw	Lara Roberts; Australia	54.79 m	Renee Hardy; Australia	51.44 m	Genie Gerardo; Guam	30.77 m
Javelin throw	Angelina Tignani; Australia	44.04 m	Sharon Toako; Papua New Guinea	43.05 m	Lucie Turpin; New Caledonia	35.01 m
Heptathlon	Edna Boafob; Papua New Guinea	4,062 pts	Monica Korowi; Papua New Guinea	2,848 pts		

== Para-events summary ==
=== Men's ===
Event	Gold		Silver		Bronze	
100 metres ambulant wind: -0.8 m/s	Steven Abraham; Papua New Guinea	11.69 (T46); Performance: 89.13%	Cosmol Maefolia; Solomon Islands	12.72 (T38); Performance: 84.43%	Tom Lulait; New Caledonia	12.45 (T13); Performance: 84.01%
Shotput ambulant	Iosefo Rakesa; Fiji	9.43 m(F41); Performance: 65.89%	Cosmol Maefolia; Solomon Islands	7.64 m(T38); Performance: 47.89%	Jimi Onitoro; Fiji	6.93 m(T46); Performance: 41.25%
Shotput secured throw	Marcelin Walico; New Caledonia	10.41 m(F57); Performance: 68.21%	Christian Chee Ayee; French Polynesia	7.77 m(F56); Performance: 57.59%	Morea Mararos; Papua New Guinea	6.74 m(T/F34); Performance: 55.38%
Javelin throw ambulant	Iosefo Rakesa; Fiji	36.93 m(F41); Performance: 83.26%	Cosmol Maefolia; Solomon Islands	31.39 m(T38); Performance: 53.95%	Steven Abraham; Papua New Guinea	33.37 m(T46); Performance: 52.16%

=== Women's ===
Event	Gold		Silver		Bronze	
100 metres ambulant wind: m/s	Donna Longbut; Papua New Guinea	14.27 (T/F46); Performance: 83.32%	Rose Vandegou; New Caledonia	21.71 (T/F41); Performance: 81.52%	Jeminah Otoa; Solomon Islands	15.50 (T47/F46); Performance: 76.70%
Shotput ambulant	Naibili Vatunisolo; Fiji	7.42 m(F42); Performance: 78.51%	Rose Vandegou; New Caledonia	6.84 m(T/F41); Performance: 65.64%	Donna Longbut; Papua New Guinea	7.49 m(T/F46); Performance: 60.03%
Javelin throw ambulant	Rose Vandegou; New Caledonia	22.54 m(T/F41); Performance: 74.78%	Regina Edward; Papua New Guinea	23.91 m(F44); Performance: 55.44%	Jeminah Otoa; Solomon Islands	25.23 m(T47/F46); Performance: 55.17%
