= Yeshnil Karan =

Fijian long-distance runner (born 2001)

Personal information
- Born: 16 March 2001 (age 25) Tavua, Fiji

Sport
- Country: Fiji
- Sport: Athletics
Medal record
Men's Athletics
Representing Fiji
Pacific Games
Gold medal – first place	2023 Honiara	5000 m
Gold medal – first place	2023 Honiara	10000 m
Pacific Mini Games
Gold medal – first place	2022 Saipan	1500 m
Bronze medal – third place	2022 Saipan	5000 m
Oceania Championships
Bronze medal – third place	2022 Mackay	5000 m
- Updated on 1 December 2023

Yeshnil Karan (born 16 March 2001) is a Fijian long-distance runner who has represented Fiji at the Commonwealth Games, Pacific Games and Pacific Mini Games.

Karan is from Yaladro, Tavua, and was educated at Tavua College.

Karan was controversially not selected for the 2019 Pacific Games.

At the 2022 Pacific Mini Games in Saipan he won gold in the 1,500 metres and bronze in the 5,000 metres.

Karan was selected for the 2022 Commonwealth Games in Birmingham, England.

At the 2023 Pacific Games in Honiara he won gold in the 10,000 metres, 5,000 metres, and 3,000 metres steeplechase.
