= Vaihina Doucet =

French Polynesian shot putter (born 2001)

Personal information
- Born: 27 July 2001

Sport
- Country: French Polynesia
- Sport: Shot put
Medal record
Women's Shot put
Representing Tahiti
Pacific Mini Games
Silver medal – second place	2022 Saipan	Shot put
Pacific Games
Bronze medal – third place	2019 Apia	Shot put

Vaihina Doucet (born 27 July 2001) is a French Polynesian shot-putter who has represented French Polynesia at the Pacific Games and Pacific Mini Games

At the 2019 Pacific Games in Apia she won bronze. At the 2022 Pacific Mini Games in Saipan she won silver.
