= Loveleina Wong-Sang =

French Polynesian athlete (born 2002)

Personal information
- Born: 14 February 2002

Sport
- Country: French Polynesia
- Sport: Shot put
Medal record
Women's Shot put
Representing Tahiti
Pacific Mini Games
Silver medal – second place	2022 Saipan	Discus throw
Bronze medal – third place	2022 Saipan	Shot put

Loveleina Wong-Sang (born 14 February 2002) is a French Polynesian shot-putter and discus thrower who has represented French Polynesia at the Pacific Games and Pacific Mini Games.

She competed in the 2019 Pacific Games in Apia, coming ninth in the shot-put. In 2021 she won bronze in the shot put at the French junior championships. At the 2022 Pacific Mini Games in Saipan she won silver in the discus and bronze in the shot put.

Wong-sang is coached by Tumatai Dauphin.
