= New Zealand at the 2023 Pacific Games =

- IOC code: NZL
- National federation: New Zealand Olympic Committee

in Honiara, Solomon Islands 19 November 2023 – 2 December 2023
- Competitors: 46 (22 men and 24 women) in 7 sports
- Flag bearer (opening): David Liti
- Flag bearer (closing): Wendell Stanley
- Officials: Nin Roberts (chef de mission)
- Medals Ranked 8th: Gold 10 Silver 13 Bronze 12 Total 35

Pacific Games appearances
- 2015; 2019; 2023

New Zealand competed at the 2023 Pacific Games in Honiara, Solomon Islands, from 19 November to 2 December 2023. This was New Zealand's third appearance at the games since first appearing in 2015.

These games saw New Zealand field their largest team ever to the Pacific Games, with around 70 athletes from seven sports to be selected.

== Medal tables ==
Unless otherwise stated, all dates and times are in Solomon Islands Time (UTC+11), two hours behind New Zealand Daylight Time (UTC+13).

Medal	Name	Sport	Event	Date
Gold	Emma McIntyre	Weightlifting	Women's 64 kg (total)	21 November
Gold	Renee Baarspul	Weightlifting	Women's 87 kg (snatch)	23 November
Gold	Renee Baarspul	Weightlifting	Women's 87 kg (clean & jerk)	23 November
Gold	Renee Baarspul	Weightlifting	Women's 87 kg (total)	23 November
Gold	David Liti	Weightlifting	Men's 109+ kg (snatch)	24 November
Gold	David Liti	Weightlifting	Men's 109+ kg (clean & jerk)	24 November
Gold	David Liti	Weightlifting	Men's 109+ kg (total)	24 November
Gold	Tillie Hollyer	Athletics	Women's 800 m	28 November
Gold	Tillie Hollyer	Athletics	Women's 1500 m	30 November
Gold	Jack Paine	Athletics	Men's 1500 m	30 November
Silver	Emma McIntyre	Weightlifting	Women's 64 kg (snatch)	21 November
Silver	Emma McIntyre	Weightlifting	Women's 64 kg (clean & jerk)	21 November
Silver	Hayley Whiting	Weightlifting	Women's 81 kg (snatch)	23 November
Silver	Hayley Whiting	Weightlifting	Women's 81 kg (clean & jerk)	23 November
Silver	Hayley Whiting	Weightlifting	Women's 81 kg (total)	23 November
Silver	James Goulding	Table tennis	Men's singles seated	25 November
Silver	Peyton Leigh	Athletics	Women's 800 m	28 November
Silver	Jack Paine	Athletics	Men's 800 m	28 November
Silver	Elizabeth Hewitt	Athletics	Women's hammer throw	28 November
Silver	Camryn Smart	Athletics	Women's 400 m	29 November
Silver	Peyton Leigh	Athletics	Women's 1500 m	30 November
Silver	Liam O'Donnell	Athletics	Men's 1500 m	30 November
Silver	Scott Thomson	Athletics	Men's triple jump	1 December
Bronze	Elizabeth Granger	Weightlifting	Women's 59 kg (snatch)	21 November
Bronze	Riana Froger	Weightlifting	Women's 59 kg (clean & jerk)	21 November
Bronze	Riana Froger	Weightlifting	Women's 59 kg (total)	21 November
Bronze	Susana Nimo	Weightlifting	Women's 87+ kg (snatch)	24 November
Bronze	Susana Nimo	Weightlifting	Women's 87+ kg (clean & jerk)	24 November
Bronze	Susana Nimo	Weightlifting	Women's 87+ kg (total)	24 November
Bronze	Malachi Faamausili-Fala	Weightlifting	Men's 109+ kg (snatch)	24 November
Bronze	Malachi Faamausili-Fala	Weightlifting	Men's 109+ kg (clean & jerk)	24 November
Bronze	Malachi Faamausili-Fala	Weightlifting	Men's 109+ kg (total)	24 November
Bronze	Stephen Thorpe	Athletics	Men's decathlon	28 November
Bronze	Jordan Evans-Tobata; Tillie Hollyer; Peyton Leigh; Georgia Whiteman	Athletics	Women's 4x400 m	30 November

Medals by sport
Sport	Gold medal	Silver medal	Bronze medal	Total
Weightlifting	7	5	9	21
Athletics	3	7	2	12
Table tennis	0	1	0	1
Total	10	13	11	34

Medals by date
Date	Gold medal	Silver medal	Bronze medal	Total
20 November	0	0	0	0
21 November	1	2	3	6
22 November	0	0	0	0
23 November	3	3	0	6
24 November	3	0	5	8
25 November	0	1	0	1
26 November	0	0	0	0
27 November	0	0	0	0
28 November	1	3	1	5
29 November	0	1	0	0
30 November	2	2	1	5
1 December	0	1	0	0
2 December	0	0	0	0
Total	10	13	11	34

Medals by gender
Gender	Gold medal	Silver medal	Bronze medal	Total
Female	6	9	7	22
Male	4	4	4	12
Mixed / open	0	0	0	0
Total	10	13	11	34

== Competitors ==
The following is the list of number of competitors in the Games.

Sport	Men	Women	Total
Archery	1	1	2
Athletics	9	10	19
Boxing	7	6	13
Table tennis	2	0	2
Weightlifting	3	7	10
Total	22	24	46

== Archery ==
The New Zealand Olympic Committee (NZOC) has selected a team of two archers in September, 2023. Their selections were based on their performances at the recent 2023 World Archery Championships in Berlin (July 31 – 6 August) and also domestic and international performances in 2023.

Men

Athlete	Event	Ranking round		Round of 32	Round of 16	Quarterfinals	Semifinals	Final / BM	
Athlete	Event	Score	Seed	Opposition Score	Opposition Score	Opposition Score	Opposition Score	Opposition Score	Rank
Finn Matheson	Single 720 Round 70m	547	8	—N/a					
Finn Matheson	Recurve matchplay	547	8	Runa (VAN); W 6–0	Richert (NCL); L 3–7	Did not advance			

Women

Athlete	Event	Ranking round		Round of 16	Quarterfinals	Semifinals	Final / BM	
Athlete	Event	Score	Seed	Opposition Score	Opposition Score	Opposition Score	Opposition Score	Rank
Nuala Edmundson	Single 720 Round 70m	571	Bronze	—N/a				
Nuala Edmundson	Matchplay	571	3	Rengulbai (PLW); W 6–0	Prasad (FIJ); W 6–0	Haywood (AUS); L 4–6	David (NCL); L 2–6	4

Mixed

Athlete	Event	Ranking round		Quarterfinals	Semifinals	Final / BM	
Athlete	Event	Score	Seed	Opposition Score	Opposition Score	Opposition Score	Rank
Finn Matheson; Nuala Edmundson	Mixed team recurve			L –	Did not advance		

== Athletics ==
On 8 September 2023, a 19-member track and field team was announced by the New Zealand Olympic Committee.

Key

- Note–Ranks given for track events are within the athlete's heat only
- Q = Qualified for the next round
- q = Qualified for the next round as a fastest loser or, in field events, by position without achieving the qualifying target
- qR = Qualified to the next round by referee judgement
- NR = National record
- N/A = Round not applicable for the event
- Bye = Athlete not required to compete in round

Track and road events
Men

Athlete	Event	Heat		Semifinal		Final	
Athlete	Event	Result	Rank	Result	Rank	Result	Rank
George Kozlov	100 m	11.06	19 q	11.27	18	Did not advance	
George Kozlov	200 m	22.70	9 Q	22.90	10	Did not advance	
Ryan Shotter	100 m	Did not start					
Hayato Yoneto	100 m	10.80	9 Q	10.87	8 q	10.94	7
Hayato Yoneto	200 m	22.27	4 Q	22.12	7 q	21.70	5
Finn O'Sullivan	400 m	49.31	3 Q	—N/a		48.98	5
Liam O'Donnell	800 m	1:53.70	3 Q	—N/a		1:54.39	4
Liam O'Donnell	1500 m	—N/a				3:56.61	Silver
Jack Paine	800 m	1:54.28	2 Q	—N/a		1:51.72	Silver
Jack Paine	1500 m	—N/a				3:50.97	Gold
George Kozlov; Finn O'Sullivan; Ryan Shotter; Scott Thomson; Hayato Yoneto	4x100 m relay	42.16	2 Q	—N/a		DNF	

Women

Athlete	Event	Heat		Semifinal		Final	
Athlete	Event	Result	Rank	Result	Rank	Result	Rank
Lara Hockly	100 m	13.10	23	Did not advance			
Rebecca Peterson	100 m	12.57	11 q	12.84	9	Did not advance	
Mariah Ririnui	100 m	12.81	12 q	12.97	13	Did not advance	
Jordan Evans-Tobata	200 m	DNF		—N/a		Did not advance	
Jordan Evans-Tobata	400 m	58.38	5 Q	—N/a		57.44	5
Jordan Evans-Tobata	800 m	Did not start					
Camryn Smart	200 m	Did not start					
Camryn Smart	400 m	56.45	2 Q	—N/a		55.30	Silver
Georgia Whiteman	200 m	26.63	9	—N/a		Did not advance	
Georgia Whiteman	400 m	Did not start					
Georgia Whiteman	100 m hurdles	Did not start					
Georgia Whiteman	400 m hurdles	1:10.28	4 Q	—N/a		1:09.48	6
Tillie Hollyer	800 m	—N/a				2:12.29	Gold
Tillie Hollyer	1500 m	—N/a				4:26.06	Gold
Peyton Leigh	800 m	—N/a				2:13.79	Silver
Peyton Leigh	1500 m	—N/a				4:39.53	Silver
Lara Hockly; Rebecca Peterson; Mariah Ririnui; Georgia Whiteman	4x100 m relay	49.32	4 Q	—N/a		49.19	4
Jordan Evans-Tobata; Tillie Hollyer; Peyton Leigh; Georgia Whiteman	4x400 m relay	—N/a				3:57.17	Bronze

Field events
Men

Athlete	Event	Qualification		Final	
Athlete	Event	Distance	Position	Distance	Position
Percy Maka	Discus	—N/a		44.48	4
Scott Thomson	Triple jump	—N/a		14.29	4

Women

Athlete	Event	Qualification		Final	
Athlete	Event	Distance	Position	Distance	Position
Elizabeth Hewitt	Hammer throw	—N/a		53.79	Silver
Lara Hockly	Long jump	5.59	5 q	5.36	8
Lara Hockly	Triple jump	—N/a		11.31	6
Diana Ismagilova	Triple jump	—N/a		11.69	4
Rebecca Peterson	Long jump	5.35	8 q	5.41	6
Rebecca Peterson	Triple jump	—N/a		11.08	7
Mariah Ririnui	Long jump	5.69	4 q	5.82	4

Combined events – Decathlon

Athlete	Event	100 m	LJ	SP	HJ	400 m	110H	DT	PV	JT	1500 m	Final	Rank
Stephen Thorpe	Result	11.49	6.12	11.62			16.80	34.30	3.00		4:56.08	6,554	Bronze
Stephen Thorpe	Points	755	613	583	593	755	645	550	357	475	583	6,554	Bronze

== Boxing ==
A total of 13 boxers (7 men and 6 women) were selected by the NZOC on 26 September 2023.

Men

Athlete	Event	Quarterfinals	Semifinals	Final	
Athlete	Event	Opposition Result	Opposition Result	Opposition Result	Rank
Zain Adams	51 kg	Did not start			
Alex Mukuka	57 kg	Amram (NRU); W 5–0	Senior (AUS); L 0–5	Did not advance	Bronze
Kalani Marra	63.5 kg	Lutu (SAM); W 5–0	Rokobuli (FIJ); L 2–3	Did not advance	Bronze
Wendell Stanley	71 kg	Lio (SOL); W 5–0	Halstead (NRU); W 5–0	Davey (AUS); L 0–5	Silver
Emile Richardson	80 kg	Viney (TGA); L 2–3	Did not advance		
Malcolm Mathes	92 kg	Ah Ping (ASA); W 5–0	Paoletti (AUS); L 0–5	Did not advance	Bronze
Patrick Mailata	+92 kg	Liu (ASA); W 5–0	Mercury-Leafa (SAM); L 0–5	Did not advance	Bronze

Women

Athlete	Event	Quarterfinals	Semifinals	Final	
Athlete	Event	Opposition Result	Opposition Result	Opposition Result	Rank
Tasmyn Benny	50 kg	—N/a	Abana (SOL); W 5–0	Suraci (AUS); L 0–5	Silver
Christine Gillespie	54 kg	—N/a	Echegaray (AUS); L 0–5	Did not advance	Bronze
Jennifer Peters	57 kg	—N/a	Rahimi (AUS); L 0–5	Did not advance	Bronze
Erin Walsh	60 kg	Bye	Leota Teaupa (TGA); W 5–0	McDonald (AUS); L 4–1	Silver
Cara Wharerau	66 kg	—N/a		Williamson (AUS); L 1–4	Silver
Deanne Read	75 kg	—N/a	Lafaialii (SAM); W 5–0	Parker (AUS); L 0–5	Silver

== Table tennis ==
New Zealand selected 2 athletes to compete in the para table tennis on 26 September 2023.

Men's

Team	Event	Preliminary round				Quarterfinals	Semifinals	Final / GM	
Team	Event	Opposition Score	Opposition Score	Opposition Score	Rank	Opposition Score	Opposition Score	Opposition Score	Rank
James Goulding	Men's singles seated	Hawaii (TUV); W 3–0	Djaoua (NCL); W 3–0	—N/a	1	Bye	Jatutu (SOL); W 3–0	Tehei (TAH); L 0–3	Silver
Matthew Hall	Men's singles seated	Tehei (TAH); L 0–3	Jatutu (SOL); L 0–3	Moeakiola (TGA); L 1–3	4	Did not advance			

Team

Team	Event	Preliminary round				Semifinals	Final / GM	
Team	Event	Opposition Score	Opposition Score	Opposition Score	Rank	Opposition Score	Opposition Score	Rank
James Goulding; Matthew Hall	Para team male	Papua New Guinea (PNG); L 1–4	French Polynesia (TAH); L 0–5	—N/a	3	Did not advance		

== Weightlifting ==
The New Zealand Olympic Committee on 20 October 2023, announced a team of 10 weightlifters for the games (3 men and 7 women).

Men

Athlete	Event	Snatch	Rank	Clean & jerk	Rank	Total	Rank
Xavier Tiffany	89 kg	—	DNS	—	DNS	—	DNS
Malachi Faamausili-Fala	+109 kg	150 kg	Bronze	180 kg	Bronze	330 kg	Bronze
David Liti	+109 kg	182 kg	Gold	223 kg	Gold	405 kg	Gold

Women

Athlete	Event	Snatch	Rank	Clean & jerk	Rank	Total	Rank
Riana Froger	59 kg	75 kg	4	103 kg	Bronze	178 kg	Bronze
Elizabeth Granger	59 kg	76 kg	Bronze	95 kg	4	171 kg	4
Emma McIntyre	64 kg	83 kg	Silver	107 kg	Silver	190 kg	Gold
Olivia Selemaia	71 kg	86 kg	4	106 kg	4	192 kg	4
Hayley Whiting	81 kg	90 kg	Silver	107 kg	Silver	197 kg	Silver
Renee Baarspul	87 kg	95 kg	Gold	112 kg	Gold	207 kg	Gold
Susana Nimo	+87 kg	98 kg	Bronze	121 kg	Bronze	219 kg	Bronze
