= ʻAta Maama Tuutafaiva =

Tongan athlete

Personal information
- Nationality: Tonga
- Born: 25 May 1997 (age 29) Haʻafeva

Sport
- Sport: Athletics
- Event(s): Shot put Discus
Medal record
Women's Athletics
Representing Tonga
Oceania Championships
Gold medal – first place	2014 Rarotonga	Shot put
Gold medal – first place	2022 Mackay	Shot put
Gold medal – first place	2024 Suva	Shot put
Bronze medal – third place	2015 Cairns	Shot put
Bronze medal – third place	2017 Suva	Shot put
Bronze medal – third place	2019 Townsville	Shot put
Pacific Games
Gold medal – first place	2019 Apia	Shot put
Silver medal – second place	2023 Honiara	Shot put
Bronze medal – third place	2019 Apia	Discus throw
Bronze medal – third place	2015 Port Moresby	Shot put
Pacific Mini Games
Gold medal – first place	2017 Port Vila	Shot put
Gold medal – first place	2022 Saipan	Shot put
Bronze medal – third place	2022 Saipan	Discus throw

ʻAta Maama Tu’utafaiva (born 25 May 1997 in Haʻafeva) is a Tongan athlete who has represented Tonga at the Commonwealth Games, Pacific Games and Pacific Mini Games.

At the 2015 Pacific Games in Port Moresby, Papua New Guinea she won bronze in the shot put. At the 2017 Pacific Mini Games in Port Vila she won gold in the shot put. In 2018 she competed as a finalist in the 2018 Commonwealth Games. At the 2019 Pacific Games in Apia she won gold in the shot put with her personal best of 16.61 m. She also won bronze in the Discus. Previously, her best was 15.36m, made in Gold Coast during the Commonwealth Games’ final. In 2019, she became the Emerging Athlete of the Year – Female for Oceania Athletics Association. She won gold again in the shot put at the 2022 Pacific Mini Games in Saipan, Northern Mariana Islands.
