= Stephen Mailagi =

French field athlete from Wallis and Futuna

Personal information
- Nationality: French
- Born: 8 September 2001 (age 24) Matā'utu

Sport
- Country: Wallis and Futuna / France
- Sport: Shot put / Discus throw
Medal record
Men's Shot put / Discus throw
Representing France
Mediterranean Games
| Silver medal – second place | 2026 Taranto | Shot put |
Representing Wallis and Futuna
French Athletics Championships
| Bronze medal – third place | 2022 Caen | Shot put |
Pacific Games
| Gold medal – first place | 2019 Apia | Discus |

Stephen Louis Mauotekena Mailagi is a Wallisian and thus French athlete who has represented Wallis and Futuna at the Pacific Games and France at the 2026 European Athletics Championships.

== Career ==
Mailagi competed at the 2017 Oceania Athletics Championships and won a silver medal in the junior shot put event. He participated in the 2018 French Athletics Championships where he won silver in shot put.

Mailagi won gold at the 2019 Pacific Games in Apia in the discus event. At the 2021 French Espoirs Championships he won silver in the shot put. He competed at the 2022 French Athletics Championships and won bronze in the shot put.
