= Nazmie-Lee Marai =

Papua New Guinean sprinter

Personal information
- Nationality: Papua New Guinean
- Born: 2 December 1991 (age 34) Port Moresby, Papua New Guinea
- Height: 1.75 m (5 ft 9 in)
- Weight: 77 kg (170 lb)

Sport
- Sport: Athletics
- Event: Sprinting
- Club: NCD Athletics
Medal record
Men's Athletics
Representing Papua New Guinea
Pacific Mini Games
Gold medal – first place	2017 Port Vila	100 m
Gold medal – first place	2017 Port Vila	200 m
Silver medal – second place	2017 Port Vila	4 × 100 m relay
Oceania Championships
Silver medal – second place	2017 Suva	100 m
Silver medal – second place	2017 Suva	200 m
Silver medal – second place	2017 Suva	4 × 100 m relay
Silver medal – second place	2015 Cairns	4 × 100 m relay
Silver medal – second place	2015 Cairns	Mixed medley relay

Nazmie-Lee Marai (born 2 December 1991) is a Papua New Guinean athlete. He competed in the men's 60 metres at the 2018 IAAF World Indoor Championships.
