= Taufusi =

Coordinates: 13.838°S 171.770°W

Taufusi is a village on the Samoan island of Upolu. It is part of the Vaimauga West Electoral Constituency (Faipule District), Tuamasaga District, in the Apia Urban Area of Samoa. The village had a population of 364 at the 2016 census. The village name in English means Swamp as it was a swampy area in late 19th century. Taufusi is bordered by Saleufi to the North, Tuloto to the East, Lalovaea to the South East, Mt. Vaea and Palisi to the South, Vaimea and Fugalei to the West.
