= Jessica Payne =

American psychologist

- Education: University of San Diego, B.A. Mount Holyoke College, M.A. University of Arizona, Ph.D
- Occupation: Professor of Psychology at University of Notre Dame

Jessica D. Payne is a psychologist and professor at the University of Notre Dame. Payne's research focuses on the impact of sleep and stress on human memory and psychological well-being. Payne won the Early Career Award from the Psychonomic Society in 2015. Previously, she received the Laird Cermak Award for early contribution to memory research by the International Neuropsychological Society in 2010. Payne has contributed her expertise on sleep to media outlets including New York Times, CNN, and Huffington Post.

== Biography ==
Payne completed her B.A. degree in psychology (summa cum laude) in 1995 at the University of San Diego. She went to graduate school at Mount Holyoke College, where she obtained her M.A. in experimental psychology in 1999. She continued her education, receiving a PhD in psychology and cognitive neuroscience at the University of Arizona in 2005, where she worked under the supervision of Lynn Nadel and focused on the effects of stress on memory. Payne completed two postdoctoral fellowships (2005-2009), the first at the Harvard Medical School, where she worked under the supervision of Robert Stickgold, and the second at Harvard University, where she worked with Daniel Schacter and Robert Stickgold.

Payne joined Department of Psychology at the University of Notre Dame in 2009, where she is the Nancy O'Neill Collegiate Chair in Psychology and Director of the Sleep, Stress, and Memory Lab. She serves on the neuroscience advisory board of the NeuroLeadership Institute and is Associate Editor of the Journal of Experimental Psychology; General.

== Research ==
Payne's research focuses on how sleep and stress impact cognition, memory, and psychological functioning. Several of her studies have examined memories of emotional events experienced under conditions of stress or sleep deprivation, which may be subject to distortion or false memory, due to the release of stress hormones. When someone is sleep deprived and under stress, frontal lobe circuits may be compromised and the amygdala may become hyperactive, resulting in elevated levels of cortisol which impacts memory consolidation.

Payne and her colleagues have explored how memory may be enhanced when individuals sleep shortly after encoding new information. In one of their studies using the Deese-Roediger-McDermott paradigm, volunteers learned a list of related words that they had to recall after a 12-hour delay. Half learned the list at 9 a.m. and were tested at 9 p.m. whereas the other half learned the list at 9 p.m. and were tested the following day at 9 a.m. after a night's sleep. Participants who had slept performed better at recalling the list than those who stayed awake. At the same time, those who slept were also more likely to experience false memories, i.e., they recalled words that were related in meaning to the items on the list but were not actually present. Such findings suggest that a creative synthesis of information may occur during sleep.

In other work, Payne and her colleagues examined the effect of sleep on relational memory defined as the "flexible ability to generalize across existing stores of information." Participants learned pairs of premises with an embedded hierarchy and were tested on their ability to draw logical inferences based on the premises. Participants who slept prior to testing were better able to draw the inferences than participants who did not sleep, even though all groups showed accurate retention of the information contained in the premises. Payne's research provides support for the view that unique properties of sleep are directly involved in declarative memory consolidation. She suggests that incorporating a 20-minute nap each day would be beneficial for psychological and physical health, as it helps the brain to encode incoming information and may lead to higher levels of creativity. Payne notes that it is important to limit naps to 20 minutes to avoid the risk of falling into a deep sleep and waking amidst slow-wave sleep. Naps are an effective way to compensate for sleep debt, i.e., the cumulative effect of not getting enough sleep. As alternative strategies to enhance brain activity. Payne suggests engaging in five-minute meditation exercises, engaging in diaphragmatic breathing, taking walks, and changing one's environmental surroundings.

== Representative publications ==
- Ellenbogen, J. M., Hu, P. T., Payne, J. D., Titone, D., & Walker, M. P. (2007). Human relational memory requires time and sleep. Proceedings of the National Academy of Sciences, 104(18), 7723–7728.
- Ellenbogen, J. M., Payne, J. D., & Stickgold, R. (2006). The role of sleep in declarative memory consolidation: passive, permissive, active or none?. Current Opinion in Neurobiology, 16(6), 716–722.
- Payne, J. D., Stickgold, R., Swanberg, K., & Kensinger, E. A. (2008). Sleep preferentially enhances memory for emotional components of scenes. Psychological Science, 19(8), 781–788.
- Payne, J., Jackson, E., Ryan, L., Hoscheidt, S., Jacobs, J., & Nadel, L. (2006). The impact of stress on neutral and emotional aspects of episodic memory. Memory, 14(1), 1–16.
- Tamminen, J., Payne, J. D., Stickgold, R., Wamsley, E. J., & Gaskell, M. G. (2010). Sleep spindle activity is associated with the integration of new memories and existing knowledge. Journal of Neuroscience, 30(43), 14356–14360.
