= Tumatai Dauphin =

French Polynesian shot putter (born 1988)

Personal information
- Born: 12 January 1988

Sport
- Country: French Polynesia
- Sport: Shot put
Medal record
Men's Shot put
Representing Tahiti
Pacific Mini Games
Gold medal – first place	2022 Saipan	Shot put
Bronze medal – third place	2022 Saipan	Hammer throw
Pacific Games
Silver medal – second place	2019 Apia	Shot put
Gold medal – first place	2015 Port Moresby	Shot put
Gold medal – first place	2011 Nouméa	Shot put
Representing France
Jeux de la Francophonie
Gold medal – first place	2009 Beirut	Shot put

Tumatai Dauphin (born 12 January 1988) is a French Polynesian shot-putter who has represented French Polynesia at the Pacific Games and Pacific Mini Games, and France at the Jeux de la Francophonie.

Dauphin has been competing with the shot put since the age of 15. He moved to France in 2006 to pursue his athletics career. After a serious ankle injury ended his Olympic aspirations, he returned to French Polynesia to recover and become a coach.

He won gold in shot put at the 2009 Jeux de la Francophonie in Beirut. At the 2011 Pacific Games in Nouméa he won gold in the shot put. He won gold at the 2015 French Indoor Athletics Championships with a record throw of 20.10 meters. At the 2015 Pacific Games in Port Moresby he won gold, and set a Pacific games record of 19.14 meters. At the 2019 Pacific Games in Apia he won silver. At the 2022 Pacific Mini Games in Saipan he won gold.

He currently coaches Loveleina Wong-Sang.
