= Leonie Beu =

Papua New Guinean sprinter

Personal information
- Born: 28 November 1998 (age 27) Lae, Papua New Guinea
- Education: Middle Tennessee State University
- Height: 165 cm (5 ft 5 in)

Sport
- Country: Papua New Guinea
- Sport: Athletics
- Event: Sprints
- College team: Middle Tennessee Blue Raiders

Achievements and titles
- Personal bests: 100 m: 11.63s (2024); 200 m: 23.61s (2023); 400 m: 54.23s (2021); Indoors; 60 m: 7.65s i (2025); 200 m: 24.38s i NR (2025); 400 m: 56.19s i (2023)
Medal record
Women's athletics
Representing Papua New Guinea
Oceania Championships
Silver medal – second place	2017 Suva	4 × 400 m relay
Silver medal – second place	2024 Suva	4 × 400 m mixed
Bronze medal – third place	2024 Suva	100 m
Bronze medal – third place	2019 Townsville	4 × 100 m relay
Bronze medal – third place	2019 Townsville	4 × 400 m relay
Pacific Games
Gold medal – first place	2019 Apia	4 × 400 m relay
Gold medal – first place	2023 Honiara	4 × 100 m relay
Gold medal – first place	2023 Honiara	4 × 400 m relay
Silver medal – second place	2019 Apia	400 m
Silver medal – second place	2019 Apia	4 × 100 m relay
Silver medal – second place	2023 Honiara	200 m
Bronze medal – third place	2019 Apia	100 m
Bronze medal – third place	2019 Apia	200 m
Bronze medal – third place	2023 Honiara	400 m
Pacific Mini Games
Gold medal – first place	2022 Saipan	400 m
Gold medal – first place	2022 Saipan	4 × 100 m relay
Gold medal – first place	2022 Saipan	4 × 400 m relay
Silver medal – second place	2022 Saipan	200 m
Bronze medal – third place	2022 Saipan	100 m

Leonie Beu (born 28 November 1998) is a Papuan track and field athlete who competes in sprinting. She represented Papua New Guinea in the women's 100 metres event at the 2024 Summer Olympics.

== Career ==
Beu competed in the 200 meters at the 2022 Commonwealth Games.

In 2023, Beu became the fourth woman from Papua New Guinea to run inside 24 seconds and the number 2 all-time in the 200 metres clocking 23.61 seconds in Denton, Texas, United States. At the 2023 Oceania Athletics Cup in Saipan, Northern Mariana Islands, she helped Team Melanesia win the fourth Oceania Cup by winning a total of 28 points in the 100, 200, and 400 meters.

Beu competed in the women's 100 metres event at the 2024 Summer Olympics, she ran a personal best time of 11.63 seconds during the preliminary round and qualified for round 1 of the competition. She finished eighth in her Heat with a time of 11.73 seconds and did not progress to the semi-finals.
