= Vaiafai =

Village on the island of Savai'i in Samoa

Coordinates: 13°42′20.2″S 172°12′17.65″W

Vaiafai is a village at the east end of Savai'i island in Samoa. The village is part of the electoral constituency (Faipule District) Fa'asaleleaga 2 which is within the larger political district (Itumalo) of Fa'asaleleaga.

The population is 438.
