= Pais Wisil =

Papua New Guinea athlete (born 2000)

- Wisil at the 2026 Commonwealth Games

Personal information
- Born: 5 November 2000 (age 25)

Sport
- Sport: Athletics
- Event: Sprint

Achievements and titles
- Personal bests: 60 m: 6.64 s (Canberra, 2025) NR; 100 m: 10.24 s (Brisbane, 2025) NR; 200 m: 21.49 s (Brisbane, 2025)
Medal record
Men's athletics
Representing PNG
Oceania Championships
Gold medal – first place	2024 Suva	4 × 100 m relay
Silver medal – second place	2022 Mackay	4 × 100 m relay
Silver medal – second place	2022 Mackay	4 × 400 m relay
Pacific Games
Gold medal – first place	2023 Honiara	4×100 m relay
Pacific Mini Games
Gold medal – first place	2025 Koror	100 m
Gold medal – first place	2025 Koror	4 × 100 m relay
Bronze medal – third place	2022 Saipan	4 × 100 m relay

Pais Wisil (born 5 November 2000) is a sprinter from Papua New Guinea. He competed over 60 metres at the 2025 World Athletics Indoor Championships. In 2025, he became national record holder over both 60 metres and 100 metres.

== Biography ==
At the 2022 Oceania Athletics Championships he was a silver medalist in the men’s 4 × 400 metres relay. He also finished third in the men's 4 × 100 metres relay at the Championships in Mackay, Australia.

In June 2024, he was a member of the Papua New Guinea 4 × 100 metres relay team that won the gold medal at the 2024 Oceania Athletics Championships alongside Alphonse Igish, Emmanuel Anis, and Tovetina Tuna. In November 2024, he lowered his personal best for the 100 metres from 10.61 seconds to 10.55 whilst competing in Queensland to move to third on the national all-time list.

Wisil set a new Papua New Guinea 60 metres short track record in Brisbane in January 2025. His time of 6.76 seconds broke the previous record of 6.79 set 30 years previously by Peter Pulu. Later that month, he lowered it again, running 6.64 seconds in Canberra.

He was selected for the 2025 World Athletics Indoor Championships in Nanjing, China in March 2025. He qualified for the semi-finals with a time of 6.66 seconds. In his semi-final he ran 6.73 seconds but did not progress through to the final. His time of 6.66 seconds in the semi-final set a new indoor national record.

In March 2025, at the Queensland State Track & Field Championships, Wisil ran 10.24 seconds in the 100 m Open B Final, surpassing Peter Pulu’s long-standing national record of 10.40 seconds from 1995. In October 2025, he was a silver medalist over 100 metres at the 2025 Oceania Athletics Cup in Tonga, finishing runner-up to Australian sprinter Jai Gordon.

In March 2026, he competed at the 2026 World Athletics Indoor Championships in Toruń, Poland, running 6.66 seconds for the 60 metres. He competed in the 100 metres at the 2026 Commonwealth Games in Glasgow, Scotland, without advancing to the semi-finals. He also ran in the men's 4 × 100 m relay.

== Personal life ==
His sister is Papua New Guinea sprinter Toea Wisil, who also holds national sprint records and represented their country at international level, including three Olympic Games (Beijing 2008, London 2012 and Rio 2016). Additionally, their older brother Kupun represented Papua New Guinea in the 100 metres at two Commonwealth Games.
