= Obediah Timbaci =

Vanuatuan sprinter

Personal information
- Nationality: Vanuatuan
- Born: 3 June 2003 (age 23)

Sport
- Sport: Track and Field
- Event: 400 metres
Medal record
Men's athletics
Representing Vanuatu
Oceania Championships
Silver medal – second place	2024 Suva	4×400 m relay
Pacific Games
Bronze medal – third place	2019 Apia	4×400 m relay

Obediah Timbaci (born 3 June 2003) is a Vanuatuan sprinter who competes in the 400 metres event. Timbaci won bronze as part of the Vanuatu 4 x 400 metres relay team at the 2019 Pacific Games in Samoa.

Timbaci competed at the 2022 Oceania Athletics Championships, placing 7th. Timbaci also competed at the 2022 World Athletics Championships.

== Personal Bests ==
- 400 metres - 50.49
