= Jeremy Dodson =

American-Samoan sprinter (born 1987)

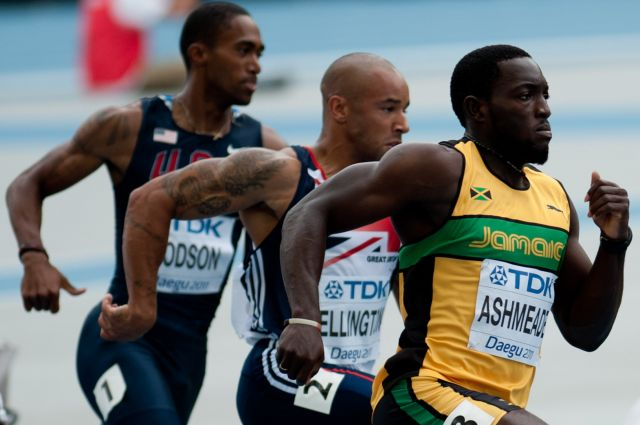
- Dodson in 2011

Personal information
- Full name: Jeremy Raponi Dodson
- Born: August 30, 1987 (age 38) Denver, Colorado, United States
- Height: 5 ft 11 in (180 cm)
- Weight: 159 lb (72 kg)

Sport
- Country: Samoa; United States
- Sport: Running, Track and field
- Events: 100 meters, 200 meters
- College team: Colorado Buffaloes
- Club: Altis
Medal record
Representing United States
Pan American Games
| Bronze medal – third place | 2011 Guadalajara | 4x100 metres |
USA Track and Field Championships
| Bronze medal – third place | 2011 Eugene | 200 metres |
| Bronze medal – third place | 2013 Albuquerque | 60 metres |
Representing Samoa
Oceania Athletics Championships
| Gold medal – first place | 2015 Cairns | 200 metres |
| Silver medal – second place | 2015 Cairns | 100 metres |
| Gold medal – first place | 2017 Suva | 100 metres |
| Gold medal – first place | 2017 Suva | 200 metres |
| Bronze medal – third place | 2017 Suva | 4x100 metres |
| Gold medal – first place | 2019 Townsville | 200 metres |
Pacific Games
| Silver medal – second place | 2019 Apia | 100 metres |
| Silver medal – second place | 2019 Apia | 200 metres |
| Silver medal – second place | 2019 Apia | 4x100 metres |

Jeremy Raponi Dodson (born August 30, 1987) is an American-Samoan sprinter, competing primarily in the sprint events of track & field. He represented the United States of America professionally at several Athletic World Championships. He then represented the country of Samoa at the 2016 Olympics, as well as the Commonwealth Games and Pacific Games. He competed in the 200 metres event at the 2011, 2015, 2017 and 2019 World Championships in Athletics.

== Background ==
Dodson was born and raised in the United States and is based in Colorado. His mother is from Malie, Samoa. His father was born in the United States. Dodson represented both the United States and Samoa at several international events, including the Olympics and World Championships, while struggling with health complications surrounding brain cysts and tumors. As a result, he went through several rounds of chemotherapy before the 2012 Olympic Games, again in 2020, and continues to battle conditions surrounding a traumatic brain condition.

== High school ==
Dodson had 10.41 – 100 meters and 400-meters - 46.91 times in United States of America and was recruited to Arkansas Razorbacks and he was named to the USA Today All-USA high school track and field team in 2005. He won 2005 Colorado High School Activities Association state championships in the 100, 200 and 400 meters. He earned silver medal at 2005 Golden West Invitational in 200 meters and 2005 State of Colorado boys Track and field Gatorade Player of the Year awards.

== NCAA ==
Dodson ran in 2008 United States Olympic Trials (track and field) in the 200 meters placing 17th. He placing 20th in 100 meters and 13th in the 200 meters at 2010 USA Outdoor Track and Field Championships.

=== Outdoor ===
Dodson is a four time NCAA Division I All-American. He earned four letters at Colorado. He stands fourth on the all-time Colorado Buffaloes list in the 100 metres in 10.27 and first on University of Colorado Boulder Outdoor record books in the 200 meters in 20.37.

=== Indoor ===
He stands third on Colorado Buffaloes Indoor record books in the 60 meters in 6.73. He stands first on University of Colorado Indoor record books in the 200 meters in 20.88.

== World competition ==
Dodson is a bronze medalist for the United States at Athletics at the 2011 Pan American Games – Men's 4 × 100 metres relay. He competed in the 200 metres at the 2011 World Championships in Athletics – Men's 200 metres for the United States in Daegu, South Korea. He competed for Samoa in the 200 meters at the 2015 World Championships in Athletics in Beijing, China, 2017 World Championships in Athletics in London, United Kingdom, and 2019 World Championships in Athletics in Doha, Qatar. Dodson qualified to represent Samoa at the 2016 Summer Olympics by meeting Athletics at the 2016 Summer Olympics – Qualification in 200 meters in Phoenix May 2016. Dodson placed 35th at 200 meters 20.51 s in Rio de Janeiro at Athletics at the 2016 Summer Olympics – Men's 200 metres opening round.

=== USA Outdoor Track and Field Championships ===
| Year | Competition | Venue | Position | Event | Notes |
Representing United States
| 2014 | USA Outdoor Track and Field Championships | Sacramento, California | 19th | 200 metres | 21.00 |
| 2013 | USA Outdoor Track and Field Championships | Des Moines, Iowa | 12th | 200 metres | 20.93 |
| 2012 | USA Outdoor Track and Field Championships | Eugene, Oregon | 6th | 200 metres | 20.25 |
| 2011 | USA Outdoor Track and Field Championships | Eugene, Oregon | 3rd | 200 metres | 20.07 |
| 2010 | USA Outdoor Track and Field Championships | Des Moines, Iowa | 13th | 200 metres | 20.99 |
| 2009 | USA Outdoor Track and Field Championships | Eugene, Oregon | 20th | 200 metres | 20.78 |
| 2008 | USA Outdoor Track and Field Championships | Eugene, Oregon | 17th | 200 metres | 20.97 |
