= Lakona Gerega =

Papua New Guinean javelin thrower

Personal information
- Full name: Lakona Gerega
- Nationality: Papua New Guinean
- Born: 25 February 1996 (age 30) Port Moresby, Papua New Guinea

Sport
- Country: Papua New Guinea
- Sport: Athletics
- Event: Javelin
- Coached by: Paul Bannister

Achievements and titles
- Personal bests: 72.26 m NR (2026)
Medal record
Men's Athletics
Representing Papua New Guinea
Pacific Games
Bronze medal – third place	2019 Apia	Javelin throw
Pacific Mini Games
Gold medal – first place	2025 Koror	Javelin throw
Silver medal – second place	2022 Saipan	Javelin throw
- Updated on 21 September 2023

Lakona Gerega (born 25 February 1996) is a Papua New Guinean javelin thrower. He competed in the men's javelin throw at the 2022 Commonwealth Games where he ranked 12th with a 63.46 meter throw. His personal best of 72.26 m set at the 2026 Oceania Athletics Championships in Darwin, Australia, is also the current Papua New Guinean national record.
