= Pesamino Iakopo =

Samoan sprinter and rugby player

Personal information
- Born: 28 March 2000 (age 26)

Sport
- Country: Samoa
- Sport: Athletics
Medal record
Men's Athletics
Representing Samoa
Pacific Mini Games
Silver medal – second place	2022 Saipan	100m
Silver medal – second place	2022 Saipan	4x100m relay

Pesamino Iakopo (born 28 March 2000) is a Samoan sprinter and rugby union player. He represented Samoa at the 2022 Pacific Mini Games and is part of the team for the 2022 Commonwealth Games.

Iakopo is from Faala on the island of Savai'i. He was educated at Don Bosco College. He competed at the 2019 Pacific Games in Apia, making it to the semifinals. In August 2019 he won the Champion of Champions competition in Samoa, setting a new record in the triple-jump. He later competed in the 2022 Pacific Mini Games in Saipan, Northern Mariana Islands, winning silver in the 100 metres and 4 × 100 metres relay.

On 14 July 2022 he was selected as part of Samoa's team for the 2022 Commonwealth Games in Birmingham.

In 2019 he was selected for the training squad for the Samoa national rugby sevens team for its Olympic qualifier. In January 2020 he was named as a non-travelling reserve for the Hamilton Sevens. He was not included in the team in its 2021 trials.
