= Daniel Baul =

Papua New Guinean sprinter

Personal information
- Nationality: Papua New Guinea
- Born: 14 February 1996 (age 30) Kokopo
- Height: 1.72 m (5 ft 8 in)
- Weight: 61 kg (134 lb)

Sport
- Sport: Athletics
- Event: Sprints
Medal record
Men's Athletics
Representing Papua New Guinea
Oceania Championships
Silver medal – second place	2019 Townsville	4×400 m relay
Bronze medal – third place	2019 Townsville	400 m hurdles
Bronze medal – third place	2022 Mackay	400 m hurdles
Pacific Games
Gold medal – first place	2019 Apia	4×400 m relay
Gold medal – first place	2023 Honiara	400 m hurdles
Gold medal – first place	2023 Honiara	4×100 m relay
Gold medal – first place	2023 Honiara	4×400 m relay
Silver medal – second place	2019 Apia	400 m
Silver medal – second place	2019 Apia	400 m hurdles
Silver medal – second place	2023 Honiara	400 m
Bronze medal – third place	2023 Honiara	200 m
Pacific Mini Games
Gold medal – first place	2022 Saipan	400 m hurdles
Gold medal – first place	2022 Saipan	4 × 400 m relay
Gold medal – first place	2025 Koror	400 m hurdles
Gold medal – first place	2025 Koror	4 × 100 m relay
Gold medal – first place	2025 Koror	4 × 400 m relay
Gold medal – first place	2025 Koror	4 × 400 m mixed
Silver medal – second place	2022 Saipan	110 m hurdles
Silver medal – second place	2025 Koror	400 m
- Updated on July 2025

Daniel Baul (born 14 February 1996) is a Papua New Guinean track and field athlete, mainly sprinter. He won a gold medal in the men's 4 × 400 m relay at 2019 Pacific Games in Apia.

Baul wil compete in the Men's 4 × 400 m relay and the 400 m hurdles at the 2022 Commonwealth Games in Birmingham, England.
