= Sharon Toako =

Papua New Guinean javelin thrower

Personal information
- Nationality: Papua New Guinean
- Born: Sharon Toako; 12 October 1992 (age 33) East New Britain, Papua New Guinea

Sport
- Country: Papua New Guinea
- Sport: Athletics
- Event: Javelin throw

Achievements and titles
- Personal best: 49.18 m (2019)
Medal record
Women's athletics
Representing Papua New Guinea
Oceania Championships
Silver medal – second place	2017 Suva	Javelin throw
Silver medal – second place	2024 Suva	Javelin throw
Pacific Games
Gold medal – first place	2019 Apia	Javelin throw
Gold medal – first place	2023 Honiara	Javelin throw
Pacific Mini Games
Silver medal – second place	2017 Port Vila	Javelin throw
Silver medal – second place	2022 Saipan	Javelin throw
Bronze medal – third place	2017 Port Vila	Hammer throw

Sharon Toako (born 12 October 1992) is a Papua New Guinean track and field athlete who competes in the javelin throw. She won gold at the 2019 Pacific Games with a throw of 47.13 meters. Her personal best of 49.18 m set in 2019 is the current Papua New Guinean national record.

Toako is a 6-time national champion for Papua New Guinea. She holds 4 national record marks namely for the javelin throw, discus throw, shot put (indoor), and weight throw (indoor).

== Personal life ==
Toako was a student-athlete at the New Mexico Highlands University in Las Vegas, New Mexico from 2017 to 2019. She graduated in 2020 with a Science degree majoring in forestry.
