= Hereiti Bernardino =

French Polynesian sprinter (born 1993)

Personal information
- Nationality: French
- Born: 21 May 1993 (age 33) Papeete (Tahiti)
- Height: 1.71 m (5 ft 7 in)

Sport
- Country: French Polynesia
- Sport: Track and field
- Events: 100 metres, 200 metres, 400 metres
- Coached by: Djamel Boudebibah

Hereiti Bernardino (born 21 May 1993) is a French Polynesian track and field sprinter. She competed in the 100 metres event at the 2013 World Championships in Athletics in Moscow, Russia and also at the 2017 World Championship in London.

In 2019, she competed in the Pacific Games in Apia, Samoa, being the first Tahitian sprinter on a podium (with a bronze medal) since Katia Sandford and Albertine AN in 1991. However, she prefers the 200m and especially the 400m. She holds the 400m record for French Polynesia.

Bernardino competed at the 2022 World Athletics Championships in Eugene, Oregon and finished 45th overall.

== International competitions ==
| Year | Competition | Venue | Position | Event | Notes |
Representing French Polynesia
| 2013 | World Championships | Moscow, Russia | 8th (h) | 100 m | 12.84 |
| 2017 | World Championships | London, England | 8th (h) | 100 m | 12.88 |
| 2022 | World Championships | Eugene, Oregon | 7th (h) | 100 m | 12.90 |
