= Adrine Monagi =

Papua New Guinean track and field athlete

Personal information
- Born: 8 June 1995 (age 31) Ramu, Papua New Guinea
- Education: Angelo State University
- Height: 1.60 m (5 ft 3 in)
- Weight: 52 kg (115 lb)

Sport
- Sport: Track and field
- Events: Heptathlon, Sprints
Medal record
Women's athletics
Representing Papua New Guinea
Oceania Championships
Gold medal – first place	2017 Suva	Heptathlon
Bronze medal – third place	2019 Townsville	4 × 100 m relay
Pacific Games
Gold medal – first place	2015 Port Moresby	Heptathlon
Gold medal – first place	2023 Honiara	4 × 100 m relay
Gold medal – first place	2023 Honiara	4 × 400 m relay
Silver medal – second place	2015 Port Moresby	Long Jump
Silver medal – second place	2015 Port Moresby	4×100 m relay
Silver medal – second place	2019 Apia	100 m hurdles
Silver medal – second place	2019 Apia	4×100 m relay
Silver medal – second place	2023 Honiara	100 m hurdles
Pacific Mini Games
Gold medal – first place	2017 Port Vila	100 m hurdles
Gold medal – first place	2017 Port Vila	Heptathlon
Gold medal – first place	2022 Saipan	100 m hurdles
Gold medal – first place	2022 Saipan	4×100 m relay
Bronze medal – third place	2017 Port Vila	Long jump
Oceania U20 Championships
Gold medal – first place	2014 Rarotonga	Javelin throw
Silver medal – second place	2014 Rarotonga	Heptathlon
- Updated on 24 September 2023

Adrine Monagi (born 8 June 1995) is a Papua New Guinean track and field athlete, specialising in the heptathlon and 100 metres hurdles. As a competitor in heptathlon, she is the 2017 Oceania champion, 2015 Pacific Games champion, and the 2017 Pacific Mini Games champion. She competed in the 100 metres hurdles at the 2019 Doha World Championships without advancing from the first round.

Monagi currently holds the Papua New Guinean national records for the heptathlon, 100 m hurdles, indoor pentathlon, and indoor shot put. She is also part of the quartet that set the current PNG women's 4 × 100 metres relay national record of 45.38 s at the 2022 Commonwealth Games.

== Personal Bests ==
Outdoor Personal Bests

Event	Record	Venue	Date	Notes
100 metres	11.93	Suva, Fiji	5 June 2024	
200 metres	24.54	Brisbane, Australia	11 November 2023	
800 metres	2:20.67	Bradenton, United States	27 May 2016	
100 metres hurdles	13.46	Adelaide, Australia	14 April 2024	Papua New Guinean national record
High jump	1.71 m	Port Moresby, Papua New Guinea	15 July 2015	3rd highest ever by a Papua New Guinean high jumper.
Long jump	5.72 m	Waco, United States	23 April 2016	
Shot put	11.68 m	Bradenton, United States	25 May 2017	
Javelin	41.26 m	Commerce, Texas, United States	6 May 2017	
Heptathlon	5221 pts	San Angelo, United States	16 March 2017	Papua New Guinean national record

Indoor Personal Bests

Event	Record	Venue	Date	Notes
60 metres	7.71 secs	Grinnell, United States	7 February 2015	
800 metres	2:25.42	Birmingham, United States	10 March 2017	
60 metres hurdles	8.68 secs	Albuquerque, United States	3 February 2017	
High jump	1.67 m	Alamosa, United States	18 February 2017	
Long Jump	5.58 m	Frisco, United States	9 February 2017	
Shot put	10.81 m	Albuquerque, United States	3 February 2017	Papua New Guinean national record
Pentathlon	3,677 pts	Alamosa, United States	18 February 2017	Papua New Guinean national record

- All information taken from World Athletics athlete-profile.
