= Donny Tuimaseve =

Samoan javelin thrower

Personal information
- Full name: Donny Tuimaseve
- Nationality: Samoan
- Born: 17 April 1999 (age 27) Vaiafai, Samoa
- Height: 184 cm (6 ft 0 in)
- Weight: 65 kg (143 lb)

Sport
- Sport: Athletics
- Event: Javelin throw
Medal record
Representing Samoa
Men's athletics
Pacific Mini Games
Gold medal – first place	2017 Port Vila	Javelin
Gold medal – first place	2022 Saipan	Javelin

Donny Tuimaseve (born 17 April 1999) is a Samoan athlete. He competed in the 2018 Commonwealth Games on the Gold Coast in Australia, as well as in the 2022 Pacific Mini Games.

Tuimaseve was born in Vaiafai on the island of Savaiʻi.

He competed in the 2017 Pacific Mini Games, winning a gold medal with a throw of 63.73m. At the Gold Coast Commonwealth Games in 2018 he came 10th in his qualifying round, with a throw of 67.78m. Following the competition he took a three year break from the sport to work as a Mormon missionary in the Philippines.

At the 2022 Pacific Mini Games in Saipan he won gold in the javelin with a throw of 69.05m.
