= Rellie Kaputin =

Papua New Guinean athlete

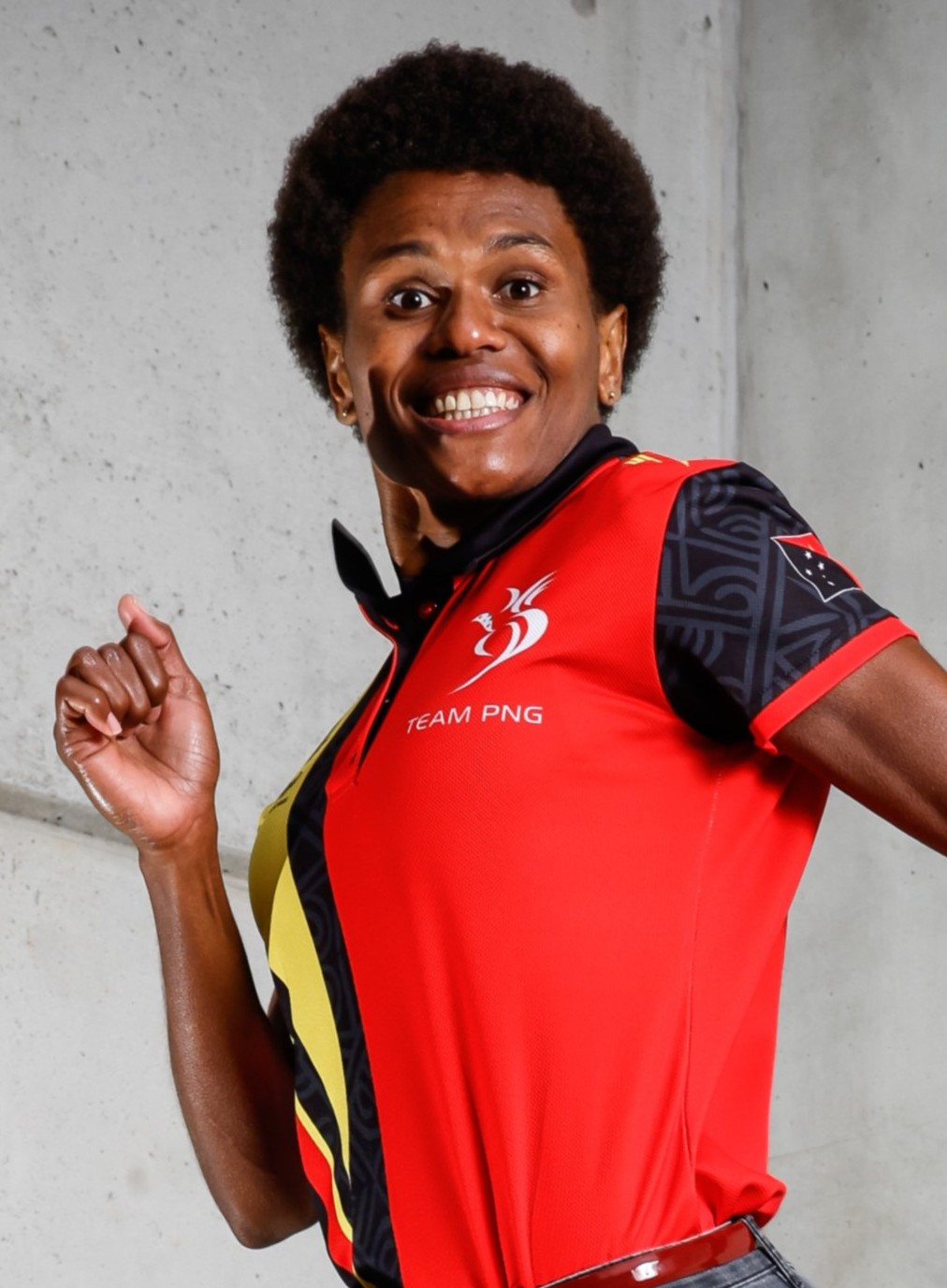
- Kaputin in 2021

Personal information
- Born: March 12, 1993 (age 33) East New Britain, Papua New Guinea
- Home town: Canyon, West Texas, United States
- Height: 1.73 m (5 ft 8 in)
- Weight: 54 kg (119 lb)

Sport
- Country: Papua New Guinea
- Event(s): High Jump, Long Jump, Triple Jump
- College team: West Texas A&M Lady Buffs
- Turned pro: 2017

Achievements and titles
- Personal best(s): High Jump: 1.77m Long Jump: 6.50m Triple Jump: 13.28m
Medal record
Women's Athletics
Representing Papua New Guinea
Pacific Games
Gold medal – first place	2015 Port Moresby	High jump
Gold medal – first place	2015 Port Moresby	Long jump
Gold medal – first place	2015 Port Moresby	Triple jump
Gold medal – first place	2019 Apia	Long jump
Silver medal – second place	2019 Apia	High jump
Silver medal – second place	2019 Apia	Triple jump
Silver medal – second place	2023 Honiara	High jump
Bronze medal – third place	2023 Honiara	Long jump
Bronze medal – third place	2023 Honiara	Triple jump
Pacific Mini Games
Gold medal – first place	2017 Port Vila	Long jump
Gold medal – first place	2017 Port Vila	Triple jump
Gold medal – first place	2022 Saipan	High jump
Silver medal – second place	2017 Port Vila	High jjump
Silver medal – second place	2022 Saipan	Long jump
Silver medal – second place	2022 Saipan	Triple jump
Oceania Championships
Gold medal – first place	2019 Townsville	Long jump
Gold medal – first place	2019 Townsville	Triple jump
Gold medal – first place	2017 Suva	High jump
Gold medal – first place	2017 Suva	Long jump
Gold medal – first place	2017 Suva	Triple jump
Silver medal – second place	2014 Rarotonga	High jump
Silver medal – second place	2014 Rarotonga	Long jump
Bronze medal – third place	2014 Rarotonga	Triple jump

Rellie Kaputin (born March 12, 1993) is a Papua New Guinean track and field athlete who specializes in the jumps. She competed at the 2020 Summer Olympics, in Women's long jump.

== Life ==
She studied at West Texas A&M University.

She currently holds the national records for the high jump, long jump, and triple jump events. In 2017, Kaputin competed at the 2017 World Championships in London, Great Britain jumping 5 meters 59 in the long jump qualification round without advancing to the final.

== International competitions ==
Year	Competition	Venue	Position	Event	Notes
Representing Papua New Guinea
2013	Pacific Mini Games	Mata-Utu, Wallis and Futuna	=4th	High jump	1.45 m
2013	Pacific Mini Games	Mata-Utu, Wallis and Futuna	5th	Long jump	5.05 m
2014	Oceania Championships	Rarotonga, Cook Islands	2nd	High jump	1.57 m
2014	Oceania Championships	Rarotonga, Cook Islands	2nd	Long jump	5.56 m
2014	Oceania Championships	Rarotonga, Cook Islands	3rd	Triple jump	11.35 m
2015	Pacific Games	Port Moresby, Papua New Guinea	1st	High jump	1.77 m
2015	Pacific Games	Port Moresby, Papua New Guinea	1st	Long jump	5.97 m
2015	Pacific Games	Port Moresby, Papua New Guinea	1st	Triple jump	12.65 m
2016	Melanesian Championships	Suva, Fiji	2nd	High jump	1.69 m
2016	Melanesian Championships	Suva, Fiji	1st	Long jump	5.95 m
2016	Melanesian Championships	Suva, Fiji	1st	Triple jump	12.25 m
2017	Oceania Championships	Suva, Fiji	1st	High jump	1.65 m
2017	Oceania Championships	Suva, Fiji	1st	Long jump	5.86 m
2017	Oceania Championships	Suva, Fiji	1st	Triple jump	13.05 m
2017	World Championships	London, United Kingdom	30th (q)	Long jump	5.59 m
2017	Pacific Mini Games	Port Vila, Vanuatu	2nd	High jump	1.65 m
2017	Pacific Mini Games	Port Vila, Vanuatu	1st	Long jump	6.40 m
2017	Pacific Mini Games	Port Vila, Vanuatu	1st	Triple jump	13.26 m
2017	Pacific Mini Games	Port Vila, Vanuatu	3rd	4 × 400 m relay	4:06.39
2018	Commonwealth Games	Gold Coast, Australia	13th (q)	Long jump	6.18 m
2018	Commonwealth Games	Gold Coast, Australia	N/A	Triple jump	NM
2019	Oceania Championships	Townsville, Australia	1st	Long jump	6.50 m
2019	Oceania Championships	Townsville, Australia	1st	Triple jump	13.04 m
2019	Pacific Games	Apia, Samoa	2nd	High jump	1.65 m
2019	Pacific Games	Apia, Samoa	1st	Long jump	6.15 m
2019	Pacific Games	Apia, Samoa	2nd	Triple jump	12.44 m
2021	Olympic Games	Tokyo, Japan	19th (q)	Long jump	6.40 m
