= Nuuausala Tuilefano =

Samoan athlete

Personal information
- Nickname: Nu’u
- Born: Nu’uausala Sialataua Maloata Tuilefamo

Sport
- Country: American Samoa
- Sport: Shot put
Medal record
Women's Shot put
Representing American Samoa
Pacific Games
Silver medal – second place	2019 Apia	Shot put

Nu'uausala Sialataua Maloata Tuilefano (born 29 January 2000) is an American Samoan shotputter, who has represented American Samoa at the Pacific Games and Samoa at the Commonwealth Games.

Tuilefano grew up in Oceanside, California and was educated at El Camino High School and Coffeyville Community College. She later attended the University of Houston, where she was part of their track and field team. In 2021 she set a new UH record in the shotput, with a throw of 16.49m.

She represented American Samoa at the 2019 Pacific Games in Apia, winning silver in the shotput with a throw of 13.12m.

On 14 July 2022 she was selected as part of Samoa's team for the 2022 Commonwealth Games in Birmingham.
