= Kolone Alefosio =

Samoan athlete (born 1999)

Personal information
- Born: 29 September 1999

Sport
- Country: Samoa
- Sport: Athletics
Medal record
Men's Athletics
Representing Samoa
Pacific Games
Silver medal – second place	2019 Apia	4x100m relay
Bronze medal – third place	2019 Apia	110m hurdles
Pacific Mini Games
Gold medal – first place	2022 Saipan	110m hurdles
Silver medal – second place	2022 Saipan	4x100m relay
Bronze medal – third place	2022 Saipan	4x400m relay
Bronze medal – third place	2017 Port Vila	110m hurdles

Kolone Alefosio (born 29 September 1999) is a Samoan athlete. He has represented Samoa at the Pacific Games and Commonwealth Games.

Alefosio is from Vaoala in Apia. He won a bronze medal in the 110m hurdles at the 2017 Pacific Mini Games in Port Vila. He competed in the 2018 Commonwealth Games on the Gold Coast in Australia, achieving a personal best in the 110m hurdles. He later competed in the 2019 Pacific Games in Apia, winning silver in the 4 × 100 metres relay and bronze in the 110 metres hurdles. At the 2022 Pacific Mini Games in Saipan, Northern Mariana Islands he won gold in the 110 metres hurdles, silver in the 4 × 100 metres relay, and bronze in the 4 × 400 metres relay.

On 14 July 2022 he was selected as part of Samoa's team for the 2022 Commonwealth Games in Birmingham.
