= Johnny Key (sprinter) =

Samoan athlete

Personal information
- Full name: Johnny Key
- Nationality: Samoa
- Born: 18 October 2003 (age 22) Motoʻotua, Samoa

Sport
- Country: Samoa
- Sport: Athletics
- Event(s): 100 m, 200 m
- College team: St Joseph's College
- Turned pro: 2019
- Coached by: Johan Keil

Achievements and titles
- Personal best(s): 10.71s (100 m); 21.82s (200 m)
Medal record
Men's Athletics
Representing Samoa
Pacific Games
Bronze medal – third place	2022 Honiara	100 m
Pacific Mini Games
Silver medal – second place	2022 Saipan	4x100 m relay
Bronze medal – third place	2022 Saipan	4x400 m relay
Bronze medal – third place	2022 Saipan	100 m
- Updated on 15 September 2023

Johnny Key (born 18 October 2003) is a Samoan sprinter who specializes in the 100 and 200 metres. He is the current champion in the men's 100 m and 200 m for Samoa. He has also represented Samoa in the 2022 Pacific Mini Games and the 2022 Commonwealth Games.

At the 2022 Pacific Mini Games in Saipan, Northern Mariana Islands he won bronze in the 100 metres, silver in the 4 × 100 metres relay, and bronze in the 4 × 400 metres relay.

On 14 July 2022 he was selected as part of Samoa's team for the 2022 Commonwealth Games in Birmingham.
