= Leroy Kamau =

Papua New Guinean sprinter (born 1999)

Personal information
- Nationality: Papua New Guinean
- Born: 2 February 1999 (age 27) Kimbe, West New Britain, Papua New Guinea

Sport
- Sport: Running
- Events: 100 metres, 200 metres

Achievements and titles
- Personal bests: 100 m: 10.65 (Saipan 2023); 200 m: 21.02 (Kansas 2022)
Medal record
Men's athletics
Representing Papua New Guinea
Pacific Games
Gold medal – first place	2023 Honiara	4×100 m relay
Gold medal – first place	2023 Honiara	4×400 m relay
Silver medal – second place	2023 Honiara	200 m
Pacific Mini Games
Gold medal – first place	2022 Saipan	4×400 m relay
Silver medal – second place	2022 Saipan	200 m
Bronze medal – third place	2022 Saipan	4×100 m relay

Leroy Kamau (born 2 February 1999) is a Papua New Guinean sprinter who specializes in the 100 and 200 metres. He competed in the men's 200 metres at the 2023 World Athletics Championships in Budapest, Hungary without advancing from the first round.
