= Ephraim Lerkin =

Papua New Guinean track and field athlete

Personal information
- Nationality: Papua New Guinean
- Born: 27 November 1997 (age 28)

Sport
- Country: Papua New Guinea
- Sport: Track and field
Medal record
Pacific Games
Silver medal – second place	2019 Apia	800 m
Bronze medal – third place	2019 Apia	400 m hurdles
Pacific Mini Games
Gold medal – first place	2017 Port Vila	4 × 400 m relay
Silver medal – second place	2017 Port Vila	400 m hurdles
Bronze medal – third place	2017 Port Vila	400 m
Oceania Championships
Gold medal – first place	2017 Suva	400 m hurdles
Silver medal – second place	2017 Suva	4 × 400 m relay

Ephraim Lerkin (born 27 November 1997) is a Papua New Guinean track and field athlete. He competed at the 2017 World Championships running in the men's 400 metres hurdles. He competed in the same event at the 2018 Commonwealth Games in the Australia, where he ran 52.17 seconds without advancing to the final.
