= TASI =

TASI or Tasi can refer to:

== People ==
=== Nickname ===
- Tasi Mo'unga (born 1973), American international rugby union football back row forward

=== Given name ===
- Tasi Limtiaco (born 1994), Micronesian swimmer

=== Middle name ===
- Tuisa Tasi Patea, Samoan politician

=== Surname ===
- Koço Tasi (fl. 1921), Albanian politician
- Laki Tasi (born 2003), American football defensive tackle
- Lama Tasi (born 1990), Samoan international rugby union football prop
- Laurence Faapoi Tasi, Samoan javelin thrower
- Mohd Yunus Mohd Tasi, Malaysian military officer
- Pe'er Tasi, Israeli musician
- Tautalatasi Tasi (born 1994), New Zealand rugby union wing, centre, and second-row

== Places ==
- Tasi (neighborhood), neighbourhood of Patras, Greece
- Təsi, village in Gobustan Rayon, Azerbaijan

== Other uses ==
- Technical Advisory Service for Images
- Time-assignment speech interpolation
- Theoretical Advanced Study Institute (TASI), best known for the TASI lectures in astrophysics and high energy physics
- Tadawul All Share Index of the Saudi Stock Exchange
- The Animation Society of India (TASI), a non-profit organisation (see Indian animation industry)
