= 2016 Polynesian Championships in Athletics =

V Polynesian Championships in Athletics
- Dates: 7 - 9 April 2016
- Host city: Papeete, Tahiti (French Polynesia)
- Venue: Pater Stadium
- Level: Senior
- Participation: 7 nations

The 2016 Polynesian Championships in Athletics was the fifth Polynesian Championships. It was held from the 7 - 9 April in Papeete, Tahiti at the Pater Stadium.

== Participation ==
- New Zealand
- Tahiti
- American Samoa
- Cook Islands (6)
- Niue
- Samoa
- Tonga

== Medal summary ==
=== Men ===
Event	Gold		Silver		Bronze	
100m (wind:+0.5)	Eddie Herene Magele; Samoa	11.14	Jarvis Hansen; New Zealand	11.30	Cole Unasa; Samoa	11.31
200m (wind:+2.4)	Eddie Herene Magele; Samoa	22.01	Siueni Filimone; Tonga	22.08	Jarvis Hansen; New Zealand	22.46
400m	Heamatangi Tu'ivai; Tonga	49.72	NA	NA	NA	NA
800m	Teiva Izal (French Polynesia) PYF	2:04.76	Teva Tama (French Polynesia) Iti	2:05.26	NA	NA
1500m	Teva Tama (French Polynesia) Iti	4:32.38	NA	NA	NA	NA
5000m	Loïc Mevel (French Polynesia) Iti	16:10.03 CR	Samuel Aragaw (French Polynesia) PYF	16:12.25	NA	NA
10000m	Loïc Mevel (French Polynesia) Iti	34:24.68	Samuel Aragaw (French Polynesia) PYF	34:25.90	Cedric Wane (French Polynesia) PYF	34:34.76
High jump	Christopher Goodwin; New Zealand	1.85m	Jacques Tetauira (French Polynesia) PYF	1.70m	NA	NA
Pole vault	Matheo Lada (French Polynesia) PYF	4.30m CR	Anthony Boulhol (French Polynesia) PYF	3.80m	Soape Polutele; Tonga	3.60m
Long jump	Christopher Goodwin; New Zealand	6.77m (wind:+0.5)	Timona Poareu (French Polynesia) PYF	6.37m (wind:0.0)	Makalea Foliaki (French Polynesia)	6.14m (wind:+0.8)
Triple jump	Makalea Foliaki (French Polynesia) Iti	12.78m (wind:+1.0)	Jean Louis Fuller (French Polynesia) Iti	12.27m (wind:+0.3)	Jacques Tetauira (French Polynesia) PYF	12.14m (wind:+1.9)
Shot put	Nathaniel Sulupo; Samoa	13.82m	NA	NA	NA	NA
Discus throw	Nathaniel Sulupo; Samoa	45.81m	Raiarii Thompson (French Polynesia) PYF	33.35m	NA	NA
Javelin throw	Soape Polutele; Tonga	49.70m	Raiarii Thompson (French Polynesia) PYF	45.57m	Jacques Tetauira (French Polynesia) PYF	41.66m
4 × 100m relay	Samoa A	43.72	(French Polynesia) PYF A	45.01	New Zealand A	45.22

=== Men Under 18 ===
Event	Gold		Silver		Bronze	
100m (wind: +0.1)	Leti Paaga; American Samoa	11.10	Moana Faber (French Polynesia) PYF	11.57	Luteru Ahloe; American Samoa	11.77
200m (wind:3.0)	Junior Konesane Palamo; Samoa	22.61	Leti Paaga; American Samoa	23.04	Timona Poareu (French Polynesia) PYF	23.95
400m	Liam Turner; New Zealand	51.32	Sam Gouveneur; New Zealand	51.68	Gerard Hickey; New Zealand	56.68
800m	Liam Turner; New Zealand	1:58.21	Gerard Hickey; New Zealand	1:58.87	Sam Gouveneur; New Zealand	1:59.55
1500m	Max Spencer; New Zealand	4:13.22	Yanael Dubois (French Polynesia) PYF	4:31.24	Maui Rere Rangi Tatum; Cook Islands	4:54.94
3000 metres	Max Spencer; New Zealand	9:14.56	Yanael Dubois (French Polynesia) PYF	9:55.86	Ian Mevel (French Polynesia) Iti	11:06.87
High jump	Gerard Hickey; New Zealand	1.85m	Teaue Teihotaata (French Polynesia) PYF	1.80m	Teuraiterai Tupaia (French Polynesia) PYF	1.80m
Pole vault	Matheo Lada (French Polynesia) PYF	4.20m	Reggie Taumaa (French Polynesia) PYF	3.70m	Anthony Boulhol (French Polynesia) PYF	3.50m
Long jump	Timona Poareu (French Polynesia) PYF	6.49m (wind:1.7)	Kolone Alefosio; Samoa	6.05m (wind:-0.3)	Raihau Lehot (French Polynesia) PYF	5.99m (wind:-0.3)
Triple jump	Timona Poareu (French Polynesia) PYF	12.97m (wind:2.6)	Raihiti Mairau (French Polynesia) Iti	11.88m (wind:3.0)		
Shot put	Gerard Ah Nau; Samoa	14.84m	James Harry; Cook Islands	13.82m	Teuraiterai Tupaia (French Polynesia) PYF	13.05m
Discus throw	Gerard Ah Nau; Samoa	51.45m	James Harry; Cook Islands	46.12m	Teuraiterai Tupaia (French Polynesia) PYF	43.20m
Javelin throw	Teuraiterai Tupaia (French Polynesia) PYF	71.52m	Opetini Dryden; New Zealand	53.57m	James Harry; Cook Islands	45.83m
4 × 100m relay	New Zealand A	46.47				

=== Women ===
Event	Gold		Silver		Bronze	
100m (wind:+0.9)	Patricia Taea; Cook Islands	12.30	Natasha Eady; New Zealand	12.59	Sarah Pearce; New Zealand	12.71
200m (wind:+1.5)	Sarah Pearce; New Zealand	25.26 CR	Natasha Eady; New Zealand	25.27	Patricia Taea; Cook Islands	25.33
400m	Sarah Pearce; New Zealand	55.60 CR	Amanda Jayne Fitisemanu; New Zealand	57.18	Taina Halasima; Tonga	59.69
800m	Ellen Schaef; New Zealand	2:09.94 CR	NA	NA	NA	NA
1500m	Ellen Schaef; New Zealand	4:32.37 CR	NA	NA	NA	NA
5000m	Sophie Bouchonnet (French Polynesia) PYF	19:35.47	Elodie Menou (French Polynesia) PYF	20:00.26	Carine Soulon (French Polynesia) PYF	21:36.02
10000m	Elodie Menou (French Polynesia) PYF	43:22.71	Carine Soulon (French Polynesia) PYF	46:21.12	NA	NA
High jump	Mihiatea Gooding (French Polynesia) PYF	1.68m CR	Olivia Bryce; New Zealand	1.60m	Adriana Mahwinney; New Zealand	1.60m
Pole vault	Lucie Tepea (French Polynesia) PYF	2.50m	NA	NA	NA	NA
Long jump	Candice Richer (French Polynesia) Iti	5.09m (wind:+0.8 m/s)	Tahiona Doucet (French Polynesia) Iti	4.81m (wind:+1.2 m/s)	NA	NA
Triple jump	Adriana Mahwinney; New Zealand	11.27m (wind:+1.7 m/s)	Tahiona Doucet (French Polynesia) Iti	10.08m (wind:+2.2 m/s)	NA	NA
Shot put	Tereapii Tapoki; Cook Islands	13.15m	Atamaama Tu'utafaiva; Tonga	13.07m	Diana Opoapu; Samoa	12.07m
Discus throw	Tereapii Tapoki; Cook Islands	44.68m	Kasandra Vegas; Samoa	41.80m	Christina Ryan; New Zealand	38.02m
Javelin throw	Gwoelani Patu (French Polynesia) PYF	38.13m CR	Kasandra Vegas; Samoa	32.19m	NA	NA
4 × 100m relay	New Zealand A	49.47	NA	NA	NA	NA

=== Women Under 18 ===
Event	Gold		Silver		Bronze	
100m (wind: +0.6)	Briana Stephenson; New Zealand	12.44	Elise Forman; New Zealand	12.93	Vainui Neagle (French Polynesia) PYF	12.94
200m	Briana Stephenson; New Zealand	25.14	Grace Godfrey; New Zealand	26.32	Elise Forman; New Zealand	26.54
400m	Grace Godfrey; New Zealand	58.84	April Horton; Cook Islands	1:12.80		
800m	Alexandra Montuclard (French Polynesia) PYF	2:34.70	Mathilde Fink (French Polynesia) Iti	2:40.96	Margaux Poret (French Polynesia) PYF	2:43.03
1500m	Mathilde Soulon (French Polynesia) PYF	5:15.66	Alexandra Montuclard (French Polynesia) PYF	5:23.64	Margaux Poret (French Polynesia) PYF	5:27.72
3000 metres	Mathilde Soulon (French Polynesia) PYF	11:32.52	Emmy Lallement (French Polynesia) Iti	11:59.03	Sybille Pashe (French Polynesia) Iti	13:04.83
High jump	Briana Stephenson; New Zealand	1.60m	Olivia Bryce; New Zealand	1.55m	Kayla Goodwin; New Zealand	1.50m
Long jump	Briana Stephenson; New Zealand	5.84m (wind:1.8)	Kayla Goodwin; New Zealand	5.23m (wind:1.6)	Candice Richer (French Polynesia) Iti	5.13m (wind:1.6)
Triple jump	Kayla Goodwin; New Zealand	11.02m (wind:2.5)	Indji Cabarrus (French Polynesia) PYF	10.32m (wind:-1.0)	Hererava Varney (French Polynesia) Iti	9.82m (wind:2.6)
Shot put	Vanaa Edom (French Polynesia) PYF	10.58m	Vaihei Wong (French Polynesia) Iti	9.55m	NA	NA
Javelin throw	Gwoelani Patu (French Polynesia) PYF	42.85m	Vaimiti Marii (French Polynesia) PYF	37.95m		
4 × 100m relay	New Zealand A	49.11				

=== Mixed ===
Event	First		Second		Third	
800 metres Medley relay	Tonga	1:42.30	New Zealand B	1:44.17	(French Polynesia) Iti	1:46.75

== Medal table ==
Rank	Nation	Gold	Silver	Bronze	Total
1	New Zealand (NZL)	21	13	9	43
2	(French Polynesia) PYF	20	23	14	57
3	(French Polynesia) Iti	17	17	13	47
4	(French Polynesia) PYF Para	16	15	11	42
5	Samoa (SAM)	8	3	2	13
6	Cook Islands (COK)	3	3	3	9
7	Tonga (TGA)	3	2	2	7
Totals (7 entries)		88	76	54	218
