= 2012 Oceania Junior Athletics Championships =

V Oceania Junior Athletics Championships
- Dates: June 27–29
- Host city: Cairns, Australia
- Venue: Barlow Park
- Level: Junior
- Events: 35 (18 men, 17 women)
- Participation: 138 (44 East, 94 West incl. 33 from North Australia) athletes from 18 + North Australia nations

The 2012 Oceania Junior Athletics Championships were held at the Barlow Park in Cairns, Australia, between June 27–29, 2012. They were held together with the 2012 Oceania Open Championships.

A total of 35 events were contested, 18 by men and 17 by women. For the first time, the new regional "East–West" format applies with medals awarded to athletes from both the Eastern and the Western Region by separating the results correspondingly.

Athletics Northern Territory and Athletics North Queensland sent a Combined "North Australia" Team including athletes who have not been chosen in the official Australian Team.

Complete results can be found on the webpages of Oceania Athletics Association of Queensland Athletics, and of the World Junior Athletics History.

== Regional Division East ==
=== Medal summary ===
==== Boys under 20 (Junior) East ====
| Event | Gold | | Silver | | Bronze | |
|---|---|---|---|---|---|---|
| 100 metres (wind: +0.1 m/s) | Beniamino Maravu (FIJ) | 10.89 | Blair Grant (NZL) | 11.11 | Siueni Filimone (TGA) | 11.19 |
| 200 metres (wind: +0.6 m/s) | Beniamino Maravu (FIJ) | 21.55 | Siueni Filimone (TGA) | 22.55 | Grégory Bradai (PYF) | 22.73 |
| 400 metres | Kemueli Waqa (FIJ) | 53.96 | Grégory Bradai (PYF) | 54.08 | Namataiki Tevenino (PYF) | 54.79 |
| 800 metres | Alex Beddoes (COK) | 2:02.63 | Zubair Dean (FIJ) | 2:06.77 | | |
| 1500 metres | Rick Mou (PYF) | 4:21.03 | Zubair Dean (FIJ) | 4:36.60 | | |
| 5000 metres | Winsy Tama (PYF) | 17:56.92 | | | | |
| High jump | Isikeli Waqa (FIJ) | 1.97 | Robin Hilaire (PYF) | 1.95 | Phillip Wyatt (NZL) | 1.95 |
| Long jump | Phillip Wyatt (NZL) | 6.80 (wind: +1.0 m/s) | William Cowper (NZL) | 6.60 (wind: +1.9 m/s) | Namataiki Tevenino (PYF) | 6.15 (wind: +1.9 m/s) |
| Triple jump | Phillip Wyatt (NZL) | 15.12 w (wind: +3.0 m/s) | William Cowper (NZL) | 13.96 w (wind: +2.5 m/s) | | |
| Shot put | Alex Fafeita (NZL) | 15.39 | Jinnam Hopotoa (NIU) | 11.60 | Daniel Griffiths (NFK) | 10.38 |
| Discus throw | Alex Fafeita (NZL) | 45.71 | Jinnam Hopotoa (NIU) | 41.70 | | |
| Hammer throw | Alex Fafeita (NZL) | 59.76 | | | | |
| Javelin throw | Jinnam Hopotoa (NIU) | 42.13 | | | | |

==== Girls under 20 (Junior) East ====
| Event | Gold | | Silver | | Bronze | |
|---|---|---|---|---|---|---|
| 100 metres (wind: -0.1 m/s) | Elenoa Sailosi (FIJ) | 12.58 | Patricia Taea (COK) | 12.78 | Hereiti Bernardino (PYF) | 13.09 |
| 200 metres (wind: +0.7 m/s) | Ellie McCleery (NZL) | 25.20 | Elenoa Sailosi (FIJ) | 25.60 | Brooke Cull (NZL) | 26.30 |
| 400 metres | Ellie McCleery (NZL) | 56.44 | Brooke Cull (NZL) | 58.28 | Stephanie Dickins (NZL) | 58.51 |
| 800 metres | Maggie Unternahrer (NZL) | 2:13.81 | Katelyn Matthews (NZL) | 2:15.58 | Mafikovi Mapa (TGA) | 2:38.65 |
| 1500 metres | Mereseini Naidau (FIJ) | 4:49.93 | | | | |
| 5000 metres | Mereseini Naidau (FIJ) | 19:42.40 | | | | |
| 100 metres hurdles (wind: 0.0 m/s) | Mackenzie Keenan (NZL) | 14.79 | Ashleigh Sando (NZL) | 15.05 | | |
| 400 metres hurdles | Mackenzie Keenan (NZL) | 62.98 | Stephanie Dickins (NZL) | 64.53 | | |
| High jump | Ashleigh Sando (NZL) | 1.66 | Brianna Stephens (NFK) | 1.35 | | |
| Long jump | Greer Alsop (NZL) | 5.69 w (wind: +2.6 m/s) | Jade Graham (NZL) | 5.01 (wind: +1.5 m/s) | | |
| Triple jump | Greer Alsop (NZL) | 11.78 (wind: +0.4 m/s) | Miriama Senokonoko (FIJ) | 11.69 (wind: +0.1 m/s) | Anna Thomson (NZL) | 11.66 (wind: +0.2 m/s) |
| Shot put | Alexandra Morgan (ASA) | 12.45 | Angella Betty Katepu (TUV) | 8.53 | Brianna Stephens (NFK) | 6.62 |
| Discus throw | Alexandra Morgan (ASA) | 46.79 | Angella Betty Katepu (TUV) | 23.63 | Brianna Stephens (NFK) | 21.56 |
| Hammer throw | Rebecca Hodgson (NZL) | 50.94 | | | | |
| Javelin throw | Tori Peeters (NZL) | 45.49 | Patricia Taea (COK) | 37.40 | | |
| 4 x 100 metres relay | New Zealand; Ashleigh Sando; Brooke Cull; Mackenzie Keenan; Stephanie Dickins | 50.36 | | | | |
| 4 x 400 metres relay | New Zealand; Brooke Cull; Mackenzie Keenan; Stephanie Dickins; Ellie McCleery | 4:04.44 | | | | |

=== Medal table East (unofficial) ===
| Rank | Nation | Gold | Silver | Bronze | Total |
|---|---|---|---|---|---|
| 1 | New Zealand (NZL) | 17 | 8 | 4 | 29 |
| 2 | Fiji (FIJ) | 7 | 4 | 0 | 11 |
| 3 | French Polynesia (PYF) | 2 | 2 | 4 | 8 |
| 4 | American Samoa (ASA) | 2 | 0 | 0 | 2 |
| 5 | Cook Islands (COK) | 1 | 2 | 0 | 3 |
| 5 | Niue (NIU) | 1 | 2 | 0 | 3 |
| 7 | Tuvalu (TUV) | 0 | 2 | 0 | 2 |
| 8 | Norfolk Island (NFK) | 0 | 1 | 3 | 4 |
| 9 | Tonga (TON) | 0 | 1 | 2 | 3 |
| Totals (9 entries) | | 30 | 22 | 13 | 65 |

=== Participation East (unofficial) ===
An unofficial count yields the number of about 44 athletes from 10 countries:

- American Samoa (2)
- Cook Islands (3)
- Fiji (7)
- French Polynesia (7)
- New Zealand (16)
- Niue (1)
- Norfolk Island (2)
- Samoa (2)
- Tonga (3)
- Tuvalu (1)

== Regional Division West ==
=== Medal summary ===
==== Boys under 20 (Junior) West ====
| Event | Gold | | Silver | | Bronze | |
|---|---|---|---|---|---|---|
| 100 metres (wind: +1.0 m/s) | (Northern Territory) / (Queensland) Sherome Sailor (NAUS) | 11.26 | Reginald Monagi (PNG) | 11.38 | Jimmy Harris (NRU) | 11.39 |
| 200 metres (wind: +1.0 m/s) | John Rivan (PNG) | 22.24 | Avefa Junior (PNG) | 22.75 | Theo Piniau (PNG) | 22.77 |
| 400 metres | John Rivan (PNG) | 49.26 | Jordan Gusman (AUS) | 49.90 | Theo Piniau (PNG) | 50.27 |
| 800 metres | Jordan Gusman (AUS) | 1:53.13 | (Northern Territory) / (Queensland) Matthew Werner (NAUS) | 1:55.57 | Alec Arnold (AUS) | 1:57.59 |
| 1500 metres | William Ken (PNG) | 4:24.22 | (Northern Territory) / (Queensland) James Maguire (NAUS) | 4:25.43 | Joshua Ilustre (GUM) | 4:28.85 |
| 5000 metres | Rosefelo Siosi (SOL) | 16:37.27 | Henry Mabe (SOL) | 16:50.44 | John Aquino (GUM) | 17:01.84 |
| 10000 metres | Rosefelo Siosi (SOL) | 35:16.39 | John Aquino (GUM) | 36:45.15 | | |
| 110 metres hurdles (wind: +1.9 m/s) | Nicolas Raval (GUM) | 15.75 | | | | |
| 400 metres hurdles | Nicolas Raval (GUM) | 59.77 | | | | |
| High jump | Jason Strano (AUS) | 1.97 | (Northern Territory) / (Queensland) Brenton Foster (NAUS) | 1.93 | (Northern Territory) / (Queensland) Shane Chapman (NAUS) | 1.91 |
| Long jump | Matthew Free (AUS) | 6.97 (wind: -0.1 m/s) | Hayden Clarke (AUS) | 6.59 (wind: 0.0 m/s) | (Northern Territory) / (Queensland) Brenton Foster (NAUS) | 6.13 (wind: +1.5 m/s) |
| Triple jump | Matthew Free (AUS) | 14.07 w (wind: +3.0 m/s) | Jason Strano (AUS) | 13.95 w (wind: +2.3 m/s) | (Northern Territory) / (Queensland) Brenton Foster (NAUS) | 12.90 w (wind: +2.4 m/s) |
| Shot put | (Northern Territory) / (Queensland) Alexander Dalton (NAUS) | 12.89 | Reginald Monagi (PNG) | 12.84 | Jonathan Detagiowa (NRU) | 12.78 |
| Discus throw | Reginald Monagi (PNG) | 40.56 | Jonathan Detagiowa (NRU) | 40.23 | (Northern Territory) / (Queensland) Alexander Dalton (NAUS) | 39.29 |
| Hammer throw | (Northern Territory) / (Queensland) Alexander Dalton (NAUS) | 48.61 | Jonathan Detagiowa (NRU) | 28.62 | | |
| Javelin throw | Nathaniel Gardiner (AUS) | 52.02 | Reginald Monagi (PNG) | 48.06 | Liam Spannenburg (AUS) | 47.39 |
| 4 x 100 metres relay | (Northern Territory) / (Queensland) North Australia; Jonathan Ban; Mark Edgerton; Brenton Foster; Sherome Sailor | 45.26 | | | | |
| 4 x 400 metres relay | (Northern Territory) / (Queensland) North Australia; Daniel Ryan; Mark Edgerton; Jack Vollert; Matthew Werner | 3:36.56 | Guam; Nicolas Raval; Jordan Tingson; Rey John Flores; Joshua Ilustre | 3:45.94 | | |

==== Girls under 20 (Junior) West ====
| Event | Gold | | Silver | | Bronze | |
|---|---|---|---|---|---|---|
| 100 metres (wind: -0.1 m/s) | Lovelite Detenamo (NRU) | 12.36 | (Northern Territory) / (Queensland) Cristina Smundin (NAUS) | 12.71 | Adrine Monagi (PNG) | 12.76 |
| 200 metres (wind: +1.3 m/s) | Courtney Geraghty (AUS) | 25.49 | Adrine Monagi (PNG) | 26.15 | (Northern Territory) / (Queensland) Cristina Smundin (NAUS) | 26.23 |
| 400 metres | Courtney Geraghty (AUS) | 57.33 | Zoe Bogiatzis (AUS) | 59.46 | Tehilah Womola (PNG) | 60.55 |
| 800 metres | Tuna Tine (PNG) | 2:15.18 | Poro Gahekave (PNG) | 2:20.00 | Jenny Albert (PNG) | 2:22.16 |
| 1500 metres | Tuna Tine (PNG) | 4:50.19 | Jenny Albert (PNG) | 4:50.22 | Poro Gahekave (PNG) | 4:53.12 |
| 5000 metres | Cecilia Kuman (PNG) | 19:34.08 | Gethrude Joe (PNG) | 19:34.13 | | |
| 100 metres hurdles (wind: 0.0 m/s) | Bree-Anna Schneider (AUS) | 15.24 | (Northern Territory) / (Queensland) Heidi Steinmann (NAUS) | 16.07 | Alexandria Daughtry (GUM) | 17.02 |
| 400 metres hurdles | Zoe Bogiatzis (AUS) | 67.59 | Alexandria Daughtry (GUM) | 69.19 | Sierra Daughtry (GUM) | 70.96 |
| High jump | (Northern Territory) / (Queensland) Ashley Kosanovic (NAUS) | 1.72 | Kate Atwell (AUS) (Northern Territory) / (Queensland) Teagan Harris (NAUS) | 1.63 | | |
| Long jump | (Northern Territory) / (Queensland) Hayley Strano (NAUS) | 5.36 w (wind: +3.0 m/s) | (Northern Territory) / (Queensland) Cristina Smundin (NAUS) | 5.10 (wind: +1.6 m/s) | (Northern Territory) / (Queensland) Tegan Rooke (NAUS) | 5.06 w (wind: +3.5 m/s) |
| Triple jump | (Northern Territory) / (Queensland) Hayley Strano (NAUS) | 11.00 (wind: +0.4 m/s) | (Northern Territory) / (Queensland) Tegan Rooke (NAUS) | 10.78 (wind: +0.2 m/s) | | |
| Shot put | (Northern Territory) / (Queensland) Brianna Bortolanza (NAUS) | 11.78 | Paige Harrison (AUS) | 9.96 | Adrienne Worth (AUS) | 9.37 |
| Discus throw | (Northern Territory) / (Queensland) Brianna Bortolanza (NAUS) | 38.64 | Adrienne Worth (AUS) | 36.97 | (Northern Territory) / (Queensland) Heidi Hatch (NAUS) | 31.60 |
| Hammer throw | Kaysanne Hockey (AUS) | 48.29 | (Northern Territory) / (Queensland) Madeline MacFarlane (NAUS) | 39.70 | (Northern Territory) / (Queensland) Brianna Smith (NAUS) | 39.04 |
| Javelin throw | Li'amwar Rangamar (NMI) | 35.31 | | | | |
| 4 x 100 metres relay | Guam; Naomi Blaz; Regine Tugade; Alexandria Daughtry; Raquel Walker | 52.14 | (Northern Territory) / (Queensland) North Australia; Sophia Power; Rita Fontaine; Hayley Strano; Cristina Smundin | 53.92 | | |
| 4 x 400 metres relay | (Northern Territory) / (Queensland) North Australia; Sophia Power; Hayley Strano; Zoe Henderson; Rita Fontaine | 4:13.95 | Guam; Sierra Daughtry; Alexandria Daughtry; Regine Tugade; Naomi Blaz | 4:21.38 | | |

=== Medal table West (unofficial) ===
* Host nation (Australia)

| Rank | Nation | Gold | Silver | Bronze | Total |
|---|---|---|---|---|---|
| 1 | (Northern Territory) / (Queensland) North Australia | 11 | 10 | 8 | 29 |
| 2 | Australia* | 10 | 7 | 3 | 20 |
| 3 | Papua New Guinea | 7 | 8 | 6 | 21 |
| 4 | Guam | 3 | 4 | 4 | 11 |
| 5 | Solomon Islands | 2 | 1 | 0 | 3 |
| 6 | Nauru | 1 | 2 | 2 | 5 |
| 7 | Northern Mariana Islands | 1 | 0 | 0 | 1 |
| Totals (7 entries) | | 35 | 32 | 23 | 90 |

=== Participation West (unofficial) ===
An unofficial count yields the number of about 94 athletes from 8 countries. In addition, a combined North Australia team including athletes from the Northern Territory and North Queensland participated.

- Australia (16)
- Guam (11)
- Kiribati (4)
- Nauru (5)
- Northern Mariana Islands (5)
- Papua New Guinea (13)
- Solomon Islands (5)
- Vanuatu (2)
- (Northern Territory) / (Queensland) North Australia (33)
