= Athletics at the 2018 Commonwealth Games – Men's 100 metres =

Men's 100 metres at the 2018 Commonwealth Games
- Venue: Carrara Stadium
- Dates: 8 April (heats and semifinals); 9 April (final)
- Competitors: 67 from 38 nations
- Winning time: 10.03

Medalists
gold medal	Akani Simbine	South Africa
silver medal	Henricho Bruintjies	South Africa
bronze medal	Yohan Blake	Jamaica

The men's 100 metres at the 2018 Commonwealth Games, as part of the athletics programme, took place in the Carrara Stadium on 8 and 9 April 2018. Akani Simbine of South Africa won the gold medal, running a time of 10.03 seconds in the final.

Akani Simbine won his first international 100 m title, delivering an upset over Yohan Blake – the second fastest man on the all-time lists who stumbled in the final after leading the semi-finals on time. Henricho Bruintjies, Simbine's compatriot who had entered the final as the slowest of the qualifiers, split the men to win silver. Adam Gemili, the 2014 silver medallist and third fastest in the semifinals, withdrew from the final due to injury.

== Records ==
Prior to this competition, the existing world and Games records were as follows:

World record	Usain Bolt (JAM)	9.58	Berlin, Germany	16 August 2009
Games record	Ato Boldon (TTO)	9.88	Kuala Lumpur, Malaysia	17 September 1998

== Schedule ==
The schedule was as follows:

Date	Time	Round
Sunday 8 April 2018	14:45	First round
Sunday 8 April 2018	17:35	Semifinals
Monday 9 April 2018	22:15	Final

All times are Australian Eastern Standard Time (UTC+10)

== Results ==
=== First round ===
The first round consisted of nine heats. The two fastest competitors per heat (plus six fastest losers) advanced to the semifinals.

Heat 1

Rank	Lane	Name	Reaction Time	Result	Notes
1	7	Cejhae Greene (ANT)	0.142	10.26	Q
2	8	Warren Fraser (BAH)	0.135	10.37	Q
3	2	Adama Jammeh (GAM)	0.161	10.59	
4	6	Oluwasegun Makinde (CAN)	0.138	10.59	
5	5	Pius Adome (UGA)	0.141	10.70	
6	3	Kolinio Radrudru (FIJ)	0.187	11.22	
7	4	Tirioro Willie (KIR)	0.159	11.45	
				Wind: -0.3 m/s	

Heat 2

Rank	Lane	Name	Reaction Time	Result	Notes
1	2	Adam Gemili (ENG)	0.136	10.24	Q
2	4	Ramon Gittens (BAR)	0.142	10.50	Q
3	6	Shavez Hart (BAH)	0.146	10.53	
4	7	Marie Jean-Yann De Grace (MRI)	0.153	10.53	
5	3	Kelvin Masoe (SAM)	0.133	10.72	PB
6	5	Shernyl Burns (MSR)	0.143	10.76	
–	8	Nick Joseph (LCA)		DQ	R 162.8
				Wind: -0.5 m/s	

Heat 3

Rank	Lane	Name	Reaction Time	Result	Notes
1	2	Akani Simbine (RSA)	0.151	10.21	Q
2	8	Oshane Bailey (JAM)	0.152	10.28	Q
3	3	Jason Rogers (SKN)	0.137	10.34	q
4	5	Stephen Headley (BAR)	0.143	10.70	
5	7	Jonah Harris (NRU)	0.152	10.95	NR
6	6	Kevin Pio (SOL)	0.196	11.54	
–	4	Sharry Dodin (SEY)		DQ	R 162.8
				Wind: -0.5 m/s	

Heat 4

Rank	Lane	Name	Reaction Time	Result	Notes
1	3	Enoch Olaoluwa Adegoke (NGR)	0.162	10.19	Q, PB
2	4	Harry Aikines-Aryeetey (ENG)	0.143	10.30	Q
3	9	Emmanuel Callender (TTO)	0.133	10.41	q
4	8	Ebrahima Camara (GAM)	0.147	10.50	PB
5	7	Ismail Kamara (SLE)	0.168	10.70	PB
6	2	Devante Gardiner (TCA)	0.141	10.74	
7	5	Aj Lee (MSR)	0.158	11.38	
8	6	Jeremy Dodson (SAM)	0.146	15.47	
				Wind: -1.4 m/s	

Heat 5

Rank	Lane	Name	Reaction Time	Result	Notes
1	3	Kemar Hyman (CAY)	0.139	10.24	Q
2	4	Nigel Ellis (JAM)	0.139	10.32	Q
3	7	Keston Bledman (TTO)	0.160	10.35	q
4	8	Dylan Sicobo (SEY)	0.148	10.74	
5	5	Vivian Williams (SLE)	0.142	10.84	PB
6	2	Lester Ryan (MSR)	0.148	10.90	
7	6	Nazmie-Lee Marai (PNG)	0.160	10.96	
				Wind: -0.9 m/s	

Heat 6

Rank	Lane	Name	Reaction Time	Result	Notes
1	2	Henricho Bruintjies (RSA)	0.160	10.23	Q
2	4	Ogho-Oghene Egwero (NGR)	0.152	10.38	Q
3	7	Emanuel Archibald (GUY)	0.150	10.40	q
4	8	Karabo Mothibi (BOT)	0.165	10.42	
5	5	Masbah Ahmmed (BAN)	0.151	10.96	
6	6	Shaun Gill (BIZ)	0.149	10.96	
7	3	Shupeng Ah Vui (SAM)	0.153	11.33	PB
				Wind: +1.6 m/s	

Heat 7

Rank	Lane	Name	Reaction Time	Result	Notes
1	4	Gavin Smellie (CAN)	0.169	10.45	Q
2	3	Mosito Lehata (LES)	0.136	10.50	Q
3	7	Josh Clarke (AUS)	0.141	10.56	
4	5	Ali Khamis Gulam (TAN)	0.176	10.76	
5	8	Sean Safo-Antwi (GHA)	0.155	10.95	
6	6	Aaron Powell (FIJ)	0.157	11.03	
7	9	Stephan Charles (LCA)	0.162	11.15	
8	2	Frantzley Benjamin (TCA)	0.173	11.46	
				Wind: -2.3 m/s	

Heat 8

Rank	Lane	Name	Reaction Time	Result	Notes
1	5	Yohan Blake (JAM)	0.148	10.15	Q
2	9	Seye Ogunlewe} (NGR)	0.143	10.20	Q, SB
3	8	Rohan Browning (AUS)	0.155	10.29	q
4	2	Sarfo Ansah (GHA)	0.175	10.41	SB
5	4	Jonathan Farinha (TTO)	0.138	10.44	SB
6	6	Sam Effah (CAN)	0.159	10.48	
7	3	Mohamed Othman (SLE)	0.153	10.88	PB
8	7	Jessy Franco (GIB)	0.136	11.04	
				Wind: -0.9 m/s	

Heat 9

Rank	Lane	Name	Reaction Time	Result	Notes
1	7	Trae Williams (AUS)	0.139	10.28	Q
2	9	Mark Odhiambo (KEN)	0.145	10.35	Q
3	8	Sibusiso Matsenjwa (SWZ)	0.161	10.40	q
4	3	Khairul Hafiz Jantan (MAS)	0.154	10.50	
5	4	Assan Faye (GAM)	0.125	10.52	SB
6	5	Sean Crowie (SHN)	0.149	10.84	
7	2	Wesley Logorava (PNG)	0.135	10.88	
8	6	Karalo Maibuca (TUV)	0.134	11.98	
				Wind: -0.1 m/s	

=== Semifinals ===
Three semi-finals were held. The two fastest competitors per semi (plus two fastest losers) advanced to the final.

Semifinal 1

Rank	Lane	Name	Reaction Time	Result	Notes
1	7	Yohan Blake (JAM)	0.142	10.06	Q
2	5	Adam Gemili (ENG)	0.116	10.11	Q
3	3	Jason Rogers (SKN)	0.133	10.21	q
4	6	Trae Williams (AUS)	0.136	10.28	
5	4	Gavin Smellie (CAN)	0.150	10.32	
6	9	Ogho-Oghene Egwero (NGR)	0.156	10.42	
7	8	Ramon Gittens (BAR)	0.143	10.44	
8	2	Emmanuel Callender (TTO)	0.136	10.54	
				Wind: -0.3 m/s	

Semifinal 2

Rank	Lane	Name	Reaction Time	Result	Notes
1	4	Enoch Olaoluwa Adegoke (NGR)	0.147	10.24	Q
2	6	Henricho Bruintjies (RSA)	0.149	10.26	Q
3	3	Rohan Browning (AUS)	0.145	10.26	
4	7	Oshane Bailey (JAM)	0.159	10.32	
5	8	Mark Otieno Odhiambo (KEN)	0.154	10.37	
6	5	Cejhae Greene (ANT)	0.135	10.39	
7	2	Emanuel Archibald (GUY)	0.147	10.46	
–	9	Mosito Lehata (LES)	0.132	DNF	
				Wind: -0.8 m/s	

Semifinal 3

Rank	Lane	Name	Reaction Time	Result	Notes
1	5	Kemar Hyman (CAY)	0.136	10.10	Q, SB
2	7	Akani Simbine (RSA)	0.148	10.12	Q
3	4	Seye Ogunlewe (NGR)	0.136	10.20	q, =SB
4	6	Harry Aikines-Aryeetey (ENG)	0.134	10.26	
5	3	Keston Bledman (TTO)	0.154	10.30	
6	2	Sibusiso Matsenjwa (SWZ)	0.166	10.37	
7	8	Nigel Ellis (JAM)	0.151	10.38	
8	9	Warren Fraser (BAH)	0.139	10.44	
				Wind: +0.3 m/s	

=== Final ===
The medals were determined in the final.

Rank	Lane	Name	Reaction Time	Result	Notes
1st place, gold medalist(s)	8	Akani Simbine (RSA)	0.138	10.03	
2nd place, silver medalist(s)	9	Henricho Bruintjies (RSA)	0.129	10.17	
3rd place, bronze medalist(s)	7	Yohan Blake (JAM)	0.139	10.19	
4	2	Seye Ogunlewe (NGR)	0.143	10.19	SB
5	4	Kemar Hyman (CAY)	0.135	10.21	
6	3	Jason Rogers (SKN)	0.144	10.24	
7	5	Enoch Olaoluwa Adegoke (NGR)	0.160	10.35	
–	6	Adam Gemili (ENG)		DNS	
				Wind: +0.8 m/s	
