= List of Samoan records in athletics =

The following are the national records in athletics in Samoa maintained by its national athletics federation: Athletics Samoa (AS).

== Outdoor ==
Key to tables: Awaiting ratification Record not kept by AS Not ratified or later rescined by AS

a = automatic timing

=== Men ===
Event	Record	Athlete	Date	Meet	Place	Ref.
100 m	10.21 (+0.7 m/s)	Jeremy Dodson	21 May 2016	Altis Series	Phoenix, United States	
200 m	20.31 (−0.4 m/s)	Jeremy Dodson	25 August 2015	World Championships	Beijing, China	
400 m	48.67	Siologa Sepa	4 September 2013	Pacific Mini Games	Mata-Utu, Wallis and Futuna	
800 m	1:47.45	Aunese Curreen	20 August 2008	Olympic Games	Beijing, China	
1000 m	2:22.96	Aunese Curreen	30 June 2008		Gold Coast, Australia	
1500 m	3:50.24	Aunese Curreen	30 March 2008		Auckland, New Zealand	
Mile	3:59.91	Aunese Curreen	16 February 2008		Wanganui, New Zealand	
3000 m	9:46.9 h	James Hoeflich	27 November 1970		Apia, Western Samoa	
5000 m	15:42.62	Aunese Curreen	6 September 2007	Pacific Games	Apia, Samoa	
10,000 m	34:42.5a	James Hoeflich	30 August 1979	South Pacific Games	Apia, Western Samoa	
10 km (road)	33:34.1	Samuelu Samuelu	1987		Suva, Fiji	
Half marathon	1:26:26	Foatafe Tuigamala	12 December 2002		Christchurch, New Zealand	
Half marathon	1:22:59	Darren Young	16 December 2006	Oceania Athletics Championships	Apia, Samoa	
Half marathon	1:22:08	Freeman Mulipola	14 November 2026	Battersea Park Half Marathon	London, United Kingdom	
Marathon	2:41:50	Amani Tapusoa	22 March 1969		Apia, Western Samoa	
110 m hurdles	14.46 (−0.2 m/s)	Avele Tanielu	19 September 1998	Commonwealth Games	Kuala Lumpur, Malaysia	
400 m hurdles	54.46	Kuripitone Betham	14 December 2002	Oceania Athletics Championships	Christchurch, New Zealand	
400 m hurdles	54.26 (Note: timing malfunction)	Kuripitone Betham	September 2001		Apia, Samoa	
3000 m steeplechase	10:01.15	James Hoeflich	1 September 1979	South Pacific Games	Apia, Western Samoa	
High jump	2.09 m	Nathan Sua'mene	28 February 1999		Hamilton, New Zealand	
Pole vault	3.80 m (Note: record set during decathlon competition)	Iafeta Sua'mene	15 March 1975		Christchurch, New Zealand	
Long jump	7.65 m (−2.2 m/s)	Kelvin Masoe	18 July 2019	Pacific Games	Apia, Samoa	
Triple jump	15.12 m NWI	Fagamanu Sofai	17 September 1999		Apia, Samoa	
Shot put	19.46 m	Emanuele Fuamatu	3 March 2012	Melbourne Track Classic	Melbourne, Australia	
Discus throw	71.48 m	Alex Rose	11 May 2024	GVSU 10 Event Last Chance Meet	Allendale, United States	
Hammer throw	58.66 m	Alex Rose	15 July 2015	Pacific Games	Port Moresby, Papua New Guinea	
Javelin throw	67.78 m	Donny Tuimaseve	13 April 2018	Commonwealth Games	Gold Coast, Australia	
Decathlon	6953 pts	Iafeta Sua'mene	14–15 March 1975		Christchurch, New Zealand	
Decathlon	100m (wind) / Long jump (wind) / Shot put / High jump / 400m / 110m H (wind) / Discus / Pole vault / Javelin / 1500m; 11.48 / 7.20 m w / 12.74 m / 1.84 m / 51.69 / 15.86 / 40.86 m / 3.80 m / 59.50 m / 4:59.7					
20 km walk (road)						
50 km walk (road)						
4 × 100 m relay	40.26	Samoa; Shupeng Ah Vui; Kelvin Masoe; Kolone Alefosio; Jeremy Dodson	19 July 2019	Pacific Games	Apia, Samoa	
4 × 400 m relay	3:20.88	Samoa; Tavita Solomona; Iulio Lafai; Kuripitone Betham; Aunese Curreen	8 September 2007	Pacific Games	Apia, Samoa	

=== Women ===
Event	Record	Athlete	Date	Meet	Place	Ref.
100 m	11.94 NWI	Talava Tavui	27 April 2006	Coast Conference Championships	San Mateo, United States	
200 m	24.99 (−0.2 m/s)	Talava Tavui	31 March 2006	Stanford Invitational	Palo Alto, United States	
400 m	56.32	Kim Peterson	10 February 1990		Auckland, New Zealand	
800 m	2:17.60	Kim Peterson	1 April 1984		Christchurch, New Zealand	
1500 m	5:25.3 h	Mele Steiner	12 February 1983		Napier, New Zealand	
1500 m	5:20.0 h	Vanessa Barlow	1986			
3000 m	13:07.16	Faaosofia Siliato	10 September 1983	South Pacific Games	Apia, Western Samoa	
5000 m	19:42.0 h	Mele Steiner	15 February 1983		Auckland, New Zealand	
10,000 m						
Marathon	3:11:58	Mele Steiner	22 November 1981		Auckland, New Zealand	
100 m hurdles	14.75 NWI	Kim Peterson	11 March 1989		Auckland, New Zealand	
100 m hurdles	14.3 h NWI	Kim Peterson	9 March 1986		Christchurch, New Zealand	
400 m hurdles	59.27	Kim Peterson	20 January 1990		Auckland, New Zealand	
3000 m steeplechase						
High jump	1.82 m	Angela Pule	31 August 1982	Commonwealth Games	Brisbane, Australia	
Pole vault	1.50 m	Hi Fesili	30 November 1998		Apia, Samoa	
Long jump	5.80 m NWI	Kristy Slade	29 March 2003	Hornet Invitational	Sacramento, United States	
Long jump	5.91 m (±0.0 m/s) (Note: as a US citizen)	Kristy Slade	6 April 2002	BYU Cougar Invitational	Provo, United States	
Triple jump	11.13 m NWI	Sopolema Tuitama	16 December 2006	Oceania Youth Championships	Apia, Samoa	
Shot put	19.46 m	Emanuele Fuamatu	3 March 2012		Albert Park, Australia	
Discus throw	52.67 m	Margaret Satupai	11 March 2011	Australian Junior Championships	Sydney, Australia	
Hammer throw	54.13 m	Iorana Taufafo Tafili	5 July 2025	Pacific Mini Games	Koror, Palau	
Javelin throw	54.78 m	Serafina Akeli	14 March 2004		Wellington, New Zealand	
Heptathlon	4787 pts	Kristy Slade	16–17 April 2003	Azusa Invitational Heptathlon	Azusa, United States	
Heptathlon	100m H (wind) / High jump / Shot put / 200m (wind) / Long jump (wind) / Javelin / 800m; 15.13 (±0.0 m/s) / 1.65 m / 11.18 m / 26.15 (+1.4 m/s) / 5.48 m (+0.4 m/s) / 28.55 m / 2:34.87					
Heptathlon	5013 pts (Note: as a US citizen)	Kristy Slade	16–17 May 2001	Mountain West Championships	San Diego, United States	
Heptathlon	100m H (wind) / High jump / Shot put / 200m (wind) / Long jump (wind) / Javelin / 800m; 14.82 (−0.8 m/s) / 1.57m / 10.73m / 25.50 (−1.0 m/s) / 5.67m (+1.8 m/s) / 32.94m / 2:25.86					
Heptathlon	4953 pts A (Note: wind-assisted under the rules of the day (though not necessarily under current rules))	Kristy Slade	15–16 May 2003	Mountain West Conference	Albuquerque, United States	
Heptathlon	100m H (wind) / High jump / Shot put / 200m (wind) / Long jump (wind) / Javelin / 800m					
20 km walk (road)						
50 km walk (road)						
4 × 100 m relay	52.01	Samoa; Talava Tavui; Monique Lafaialii; Taliilagi Mefi; Eka Faitala	8 September 2007	Pacific Games	Apia, Samoa	
4 × 400 m relay	4:09.88	Western Samoa; Frieda Schwalger; Kim Peterson; Moira Keil ?	15 September 1983	South Pacific Games	Apia, Western Samoa	

== Indoor ==
=== Men ===
Event	Record	Athlete	Date	Meet	Place	Ref.
55 m	6.72 A	Tala Talia	7/8 February 2003		Pocatello, United States	
60 m	6.69 A	Jeremy Dodson	30 January 2016	Mountain T's Invitational	Flagstaff, United States	
60 m	6.69 A	Jeremy Dodson	27 January 2018	Air Force Invitational	Colorado Springs, United States	
200 m	21.12 A OT	Jeremy Dodson	26 January 2018	Air Force Invitational	Colorado Springs, United States	
400 m						
800 m	2:07.08	Iulio Lafai	12 March 2010	World Championships	Doha, Qatar	
1500 m						
3000 m						
60 m hurdles	8.64	Avele Tanielu	11 March 2006	World Championships	Moscow, Russia	
60 m hurdles	8.4 h	Willie Fong	16 October 1983		Auckland, New Zealand	
High jump						
Pole vault						
Long jump						
Triple jump						
Shot put	18.60 m	Emanuele Fuamatu	9 March 2012	World Championships	Istanbul, Turkey	
Weight throw	18.61 m	Alex Rose	7 February 2014	Akron Invitational	Akron, United States	
Discus throw	54.63 m	Alex Rose	21 December 2019	No Safe Throws Clinic and Competition	Youngstown, United States	
Heptathlon						
Heptathlon	60m / Long jump / Shot put / High jump / 60m H / Pole vault / 1000m					
5000 m walk						
4 × 400 m relay						

=== Women ===
Event	Record	Athlete	Date	Meet	Place	Ref.
55 m	7.18 A	Talava Tavu'i	28 January 2006		Reno, United States	
60 m	7.66	Kim Peterson	22 July 1984		Auckland, New Zealand	
200 m	25.68 A	Kristy Slade	9 February 2002		Pocatello, United States	
400 m						
800 m	2:25.79 A	Kristy Slade	1 February 2002		Pocatello, United States	
1500 m						
3000 m						
55 m hurdles	8.33	Kristy Slade	10 February 2001		United States	
60 m hurdles	8.70 A	Kristy Slade	1 February 2002		Pocatello, United States	
High jump	1.70 m	Kristy Slade	26 January 2002		Logan, United States	
Pole vault						
Long jump	5.71 m A	Kristy Slade	15 February 2003		Reno, United States	
Triple jump	10.88 m	Lanuola Keil	12 February 2000		Ogden, United States	
Shot put	12.48 m	Kristy Slade	1 February 2003		Logan, United States	
Pentathlon	3704 pts A	Kristy Slade	1 February 2002		Pocatello, United States	
Pentathlon	60m H / High jump / Shot put / Long jump / 800m; 8.70 / 1.62 m / 12.18 m / 5.56 m / 2:25.79					
3000 m walk						
4 × 400 m relay						
