= Athletics at the 2017 Pacific Mini Games =

- Dates: 11-14 December
- Host city: Port Vila, Vanuatu
- Venue: Korman Stadium
- Events: 47 (including 4 para events)
- Participation: 18 nations

The athletics competition at the 2017 Pacific Mini Games was held from the 11–14 December 2017 at the newly upgraded Korman Stadium in Port Vila, Vanuatu.

== Participating nations ==
Eighteen teams entered athletes for the track and field competitions.

== Medal table ==
Papua New Guinea topped the medal table, winning seventeen gold. Hosts Vanuatu were a creditable fourth with the second highest medal total overall.

* Host nation (Vanuatu)

Rank	Nation	Gold	Silver	Bronze	Total
1	Papua New Guinea	17	17	12	46
2	New Caledonia	9	5	5	19
3	Fiji	7	11	4	22
4	Vanuatu*	4	7	12	23
5	Solomon Islands	3	2	1	6
6	Cook Islands	3	1	1	5
7	Tonga	2	1	2	5
8	Wallis and Futuna	1	1	3	5
9	Samoa	1	1	1	3
10	Guam	0	0	1	1
Totals (10 entries)		47	46	42	135

== Event summary ==
A total of 47 events were contested at the 2017 Pacific Mini Games athletics competition.

Medals not awarded or not officially counted

=== Men ===
Event	Gold		Silver		Bronze		Refs
100 m	Nazmie-Lee Marai; Papua New Guinea	10.84	Kelvin Masoe; Samoa	10.88	Kolinio Radrudru; Fiji	11.04	
200 m	Nazmie-Lee Marai; Papua New Guinea	21.66	Theo Piniau; Papua New Guinea	21.94	Brandy Mento; Vanuatu	21.95	
400 m	Benjamin Aliel; Papua New Guinea	48.01	Bradly Toa; Vanuatu	48.15	Ephraim Lerkin; Papua New Guinea	48.20	
800 m	Alex Beddoes; Cook Islands	1:54.77	Martin Orovo; Papua New Guinea	1:55.77	Petero Veitaqomaki; Fiji	1:57.12	
1500 m	Petero Veitaqomaki; Fiji	4:19.10	Martin Orovo; Papua New Guinea	4:19.85	Samson Laus; Vanuatu	4:19.88	
5000 m	Simbai Kaspar; Papua New Guinea	16:00.10	Avikash Lal; Fiji	16:07.56	Jack Nawka Lelow; Vanuatu	16:10.77	
10000 m	Simon Charley; Vanuatu	34:05.91	Armon Napuat; Vanuatu	34:07.84	Simbai Kaspar; Papua New Guinea	34:27.40	
Half-marathon	Simon Charley; Vanuatu	1:15:44	Avikash Lal; Fiji	1:16:08	Jack Nawka Lelow; Vanuatu	1:17:38	
110 m hurdles	Talatala Po'oi; Tonga	14.78	Errol Qaqa; Fiji	15.21	Kolone Alefosio; Samoa	15.23	
400 m hurdles	Mowen Boino; Papua New Guinea	52.10	Ephraim Lerkin; Papua New Guinea	52.25	Talatala Po'oi; Tonga	53.63	
3000 m steeplechase	Simon Charley; Vanuatu	9:44.37	Jack Nawka Lelow; Vanuatu	9:48.54	Simbai Kaspar; Papua New Guinea	9:55.81	
4 × 100 m relay	Fiji; Sireli Bulivorovoro; Tony Lemeki; Kolinio Radrudru; Aaron Powell	41.30	Papua New Guinea; Charles Livuan; Nelson Stone; Nazmie-Lee Marai; Kupun Wisil	41.30	Vanuatu; Steeve Lolten; Bradly Toa; Brandy Mento; Markly Simeon	41.73	
4 × 400 m relay	Papua New Guinea; Benjamin Aliel; Nelson Stone; Mowen Boino; Ephraim Lerkin	3:16.89	Fiji; Kameli Ravuki; Sailosi Tubuilagi; Petero Veitaqomaki; Samuela Railoa	3:17.88	Vanuatu; Jackfrey Tamathui; Frem Nathan; Bernard Kapalu; Bradly Toa	3:20.19	
High jump	Malakai Kaiwalu; Fiji	2.06 m	Peniel Richard; Papua New Guinea	2.03 m	Mosese Foliaki; Tonga	2.00 m	
Pole vault	Florian Geffrouais; New Caledonia	4.00 m	Mosese Foliaki; Tonga	3.5 0m	Vinceslas Tauvale; Wallis and Futuna	3.40 m	
Long jump	Roland Hure; Papua New Guinea	7.08 m	Sireli Bulivorovoro; Fiji	7.00 m	Kevin Paul; Vanuatu	6.88 m	
Triple jump	Peniel Richard; Papua New Guinea	15.45 m	Eugene Vollmer; Fiji	15.30 m	Ulric Buama; New Caledonia	14.86 m	
Shot put	Selevasio-Ryan Valao; Wallis and Futuna	14.71 m	Mustafa Fall; Fiji	14.60 m	Erwan Cassier; New Caledonia	13.82 m	
Discus throw	Debono Paraka; Papua New Guinea	50.17 m	Selevasio-Ryan Valao; Wallis and Futuna	48.84 m	Erwan Cassier; New Caledonia	47.33 m	
Hammer throw	Erwan Cassier; New Caledonia	57.05 m	Petelo Toto; New Caledonia	53.24 m	Debono Paraka; Papua New Guinea	37.17 m	
Javelin throw	Donny Tuimaseve; Samoa	63.73 m	Pita Tamani; Fiji	62.15 m	Jack Nasawa; Vanuatu	60.98 m	
Decathlon	Florian Geffrouais; New Caledonia	7,354 pts	Stephen Ham; Vanuatu	5,291 pts	Sililo Kivalu; Wallis and Futuna	4,585 pts	

=== Men's para-athletics ===
Event	Gold		Silver		Bronze		Refs
100 m ambulant	Sylvain Bova; New Caledonia	12.13 (T11/Guide)	Peter Dick; Vanuatu	13.51 (F46)	Marc Houssimoli; Vanuatu	14.67 (T/F37)	
Javelin ambulant	Thierry Washetine; New Caledonia	43.54 m (T/F20)	Iosefo Rakesa; Fiji	27.43 m (F40)	Manako Fal Aveuki; Wallis and Futuna	39.87 m (F43)	
Shot put secured	Thierry Cibone; New Caledonia	9.70 m (F34)	Marcelin Walico; New Caledonia	10.50 m (F57)	Jone Bogidrau; Fiji	7.69 m (F57)	

=== Women ===
Event	Gold		Silver		Bronze		Refs
100 m	Toea Wisil; Papua New Guinea	12.00	Patricia Taea; Cook Islands	12.08	Makereta Naulu; Fiji	12.19	
200 m	Patricia Taea; Cook Islands	24.16	Toea Wisil; Papua New Guinea	25.13	Afure Adah; Papua New Guinea	25.33	
400 m	Miriama Senokonoko; Fiji	57.34	Elenani Tinai; Fiji	57.90	Nancy Malamut; Papua New Guinea	58.24	
800 m	Valentine Hello; Vanuatu	2:16.76	Poro Gahekave; Papua New Guinea	2:18.00	Tuna Tine; Papua New Guinea	2:19.38	
1500 m	Poro Gahekave; Papua New Guinea	4:55.77	Jenny Albert; Papua New Guinea	4:57.77	Genina Criss; Guam	4:58.63	
5000 m	Sharon Firisua; Solomon Islands	18:28.81	Poro Gahekave; Papua New Guinea	18:44.45	Dianah Matekali; Solomon Islands	19:20.59	
10000 m	Sharon Firisua; Solomon Islands	39:25.94	Dianah Matekali; Solomon Islands	40:34.80	Celine Hirzel; New Caledonia	42:02.82	
Half-marathon	Sharon Firisua; Solomon Islands	1:27:31	Dianah Matekali; Solomon Islands	1:31:25	not awarded	n/a	
100 m hurdles	Adrine Monagi; Papua New Guinea	14.65	not awarded	n/a	not awarded	n/a	
400 m hurdles	Raylyne Kanam; Papua New Guinea	65.43	Annie Topal; Papua New Guinea	66.21	not awarded	n/a	
3000 m steeplechase	Poro Gahekave; Papua New Guinea	11:54.37	Esther Boram; Papua New Guinea	12:44.76	Tuna Tine; Papua New Guinea	12:56.38	
4 × 100 m relay	Fiji; Serenia Ragatu; Elenoa Sailosi; Miriama Senokonoko; Makereta Naulu	47.43	Papua New Guinea; Miriam Peni; Toea Wisil; Afure Adah; Nancy Malamut	47.67	Vanuatu; Judithe Alatoa; Christelle Kalopong; Lyza Malres; Roslyn Nalin	49.03	
4 × 400 m relay	Fiji; Makereta Naulu; Elenani Tinai; Serenia Ragatu; Miriama Senokonoko	3:54.43	Vanuatu; Roslyn Nalin; Lyza Malres; Esther Thomas; Valentine Hello	4:00.86	not awarded	n/a	
High jump	Shawntell Lockington; Fiji	1.70 m	Rellie Kaputin; Papua New Guinea	1.65 m	Jeannette Wacapo; New Caledonia	1.40 m	
Long jump	Rellie Kaputin; Papua New Guinea	6.40 m	Annie Topal; Papua New Guinea	5.68 m	Adrine Monagi; Papua New Guinea	5.59 m	
Triple jump	Rellie Kaputin; Papua New Guinea	13.26 m	Miriama Senokonoko; Fiji	12.46 m	Annie Topal; Papua New Guinea	12.22 m	
Shot put	ʻAta Maama Tuutafaiva; Tonga	14.95 m	Ashley Bologna; New Caledonia	14.53 m	Tereapii Tapoki; Cook Islands	12.75 m	
Discus throw	Tereapii Tapoki; Cook Islands	47.11 m	Atana Takosi; New Caledonia	43.78 m	Selare Malep; Vanuatu	31.85 m	
Hammer throw	Leïna Durand; New Caledonia	43.67 m	Jacklyn Travertz; Papua New Guinea	41.22 m NR	Sharon Toako; Papua New Guinea	35.50 m	
Javelin throw	Linda Selui; New Caledonia	45.41 m	Sharon Toako; Papua New Guinea	44.42 m	not awarded	n/a	
Heptathlon	Adrine Monagi; Papua New Guinea	4,837 pts	Jemila Kuao; Vanuatu	2,646 pts	Liliy Lawantak; Vanuatu	2,436 pts	

=== Women's para-athletics ===
Event	Gold		Silver		Bronze		Refs
Shot put ambulant	Rose Vandegou; New Caledonia	7.24 m (F41)	Rose Wélépa; New Caledonia	9.78 m (F12)	Vero Nime; Papua New Guinea	6.46 m (F42)	

== See also ==
- Athletics at the Pacific Games

== Sources ==
- "Pacific Mini Games: Athletics Results" (PDF). Athletics Oceania. 18 December 2017. Archived (PDF) from the original on 18 December 2017.
