= Kivalu =

Kivalu is a surname. Notable people with the surname include:

- Benhur Kivalu (born 1972), Samoan-born Tongan rugby union player
- Sililo Kivalu (born 1999), Wallisian athlete
