= Athletics at the 2019 Pacific Games =

Athletics at the XVI Pacific Games
- Dates: 15–20 July
- Host city: Apia, Samoa
- Venue: Apia Park
- Level: Senior
- Events: 49 (including 6 para events)
- Participation: 21 nations

Athletics was one of the 26 sports contested at the 2019 Pacific Games hosted by Samoa. The track and field events were held at Apia Park on 15–20 July, with the half marathon staged on a course at the Apia waterfront on 20 July. Forty-nine athletics events were contested at the games, including six parasport events.

== Participating nations ==
A total of 21 countries, nineteen Pacific Games Association members plus Australia and New Zealand, competed in athletics at the 2019 games. It was the first Pacific Games where track and field athletes from Australia and New Zealand had participated.

- American Samoa (3)
- Australia (7)
- Cook Islands (3)
- Federated States of Micronesia (6)
- Fiji (26)
- Guam (13)
- Kiribati (4)
- Marshall Islands (1)
- Nauru (10)
- New Caledonia (17)
- New Zealand (5)
- Northern Mariana Islands (8)
- Palau (8)
- Papua New Guinea (48)
- Samoa (67)
- Solomon Islands (29)
- Tahiti (17)
- Tonga (18)
- Tuvalu (2)
- Vanuatu (20)
- Wallis and Futuna (13)

Note: A number shown in brackets is the size of the athletics contingent (excluding para-athletes) for each country.

== Medal table ==
Papua New Guinea topped the medal table for athletics, retaining the position they won four years earlier. Fiji came in second while New Caledonia finished third. Host nation Samoa was ranked eighth with nine medals including one gold.

* Host nation (Samoa)

Rank	Nation	Gold	Silver	Bronze	Total
1	Papua New Guinea (PNG)	14	20	17	51
2	Fiji (FIJ)	10	7	3	20
3	New Caledonia (NCL)	9	7	3	19
4	Australia (AUS)	5	0	0	5
5	Tonga (TGA)	3	1	2	6
6	Cook Islands (COK)	2	1	0	3
6	Wallis and Futuna (WLF)	2	1	0	3
8	Samoa (SAM)*	1	4	4	9
9	Tahiti (TAH)	1	3	6	10
9	Vanuatu (VAN)	1	3	6	10
11	Solomon Islands (SOL)	1	1	5	7
12	Guam (GUM)	0	1	1	2
13	American Samoa (ASA)	0	1	0	1
Totals (13 entries)		49	50	47	146

== Medal summary ==
=== Men's results ===
Event	Gold		Silver		Bronze		Ref
100 m (wind: -0.8 m/s)	Banuve Tabakaucoro; Fiji	10.31 (GR)	Jeremy Dodson; Samoa	10.48	Kelvin Masoe; Samoa	10.56 (PB)	
200 m (wind: -1.0 m/s)	Banuve Tabakaucoro; Fiji	20.87 (SB)	Jeremy Dodson; Samoa	20.91	Theo Piniau; Papua New Guinea	21.70 (SB)	
400 m	Steven Solomon; Australia	45.62 (GR)	Daniel Baul; Papua New Guinea	47.31 (PB)	Benjamin Aliel; Papua New Guinea	47.63 (PB)	
800 m	Alex Beddoes; Cook Islands	1:53.18	Ephraim Lerkin; Papua New Guinea	1:53.78	Petero Veitaqomaki; Fiji	1:54.72	
1500 m	Alex Beddoes; Cook Islands	4:03.13	Messach Fred; Papua New Guinea	4:06.09	Petero Veitaqomaki; Fiji	4:07.10	
5000 m	Samuel Aragaw; Tahiti	15:45.54	Avikash Lal; Fiji	15:48.93	James Gundu; Papua New Guinea	14:57.00	
10000 m	Simbai Kaspar; Papua New Guinea	33:34.90 (SB)	Siune Kagl; Papua New Guinea	33:36.86	James Gundu; Papua New Guinea	33:39.01	
Half marathon	Avikash Lal; Fiji	1:12:06 (SB)	Samuel Aragaw; Tahiti	1:14:23 (SB)	Derek Mandell; Guam	1:15:05	
110 m hurdles (wind: +2.0 m/s)	Mosese Foliaki; Tonga	14.52 (PB)	Talatala Po'oi; Tonga	14.55	Kolone Alefosio; Samoa	14.88	
400 m hurdles	Ian Dewhurst; Australia	50.86 (GR)	Daniel Baul; Papua New Guinea	51.80 (PB)	Ephraim Lerkin; Papua New Guinea	52.82	
3000 m steeplechase	Simbai Kaspar; Papua New Guinea	9:37.14	Sapolai Yao; Papua New Guinea	10:14.17	Andipas Georasi; Papua New Guinea	10:16.44	
4 × 100 m relay	Fiji; Albert Miller Jr; Tony Lemeki; Jim Colasau; Banuve Tabakaucoro	40.18 (SB)	Samoa; Shupeng Ah Vui; Kelvin Masoe; Kolone Alefosio; Jeremy Dodson	40.26 (NR)	Papua New Guinea; Linus Kuravi; Thoa Ora; Manoka John; Michael Penny	41.34	
4 × 400 m relay	Papua New Guinea; Benjamin Aliel; Emmanuel Wanga; Shadrick Tansi; Daniel Baul	3:13.06 (SB)	Fiji; Meli Romuakalou; Petero Veitaqomaki; Samuela Railoa; Kameli Ravuci	3:15.98	Vanuatu; Tikie Mael; Andrew Mahittatan; Obediah Timbaci; Nathan Kalman	3:17.90	
High jump	Mosese Foliaki; Tonga	2.06 m (NR)	Malakai Kaiwalu; Fiji	1.99 m	shared silver		
High jump	Mosese Foliaki; Tonga	2.06 m (NR)	Peniel Richard; Papua New Guinea	1.99 m (SB)	shared silver		
Pole vault	Éric Reuillard; New Caledonia	4.60 m	Timona Poareu; Tahiti	4.60 m	Kaisa Pakileata; Tonga	3.50 m	
Long jump	Kelvin Masoe; Samoa	7.65 m (NR) (-2.2 m/s)	Marvin Delaunay-Belleville; New Caledonia	7.27 m (PB) (-2.0 m/s)	Peniel Richard; Papua New Guinea	7.01 m (-2.6 m/s)	
Triple jump	Eugene Vollmer; Fiji	15.53 m (NWI)	Peniel Richard; Papua New Guinea	15.51 m (NR) (-0.3 m/s)	Ulric Buama; New Caledonia	14.45 m (NWI)	
Shot put	Mustafa Fall; Fiji	17.75 m (NR)	Tumatai Dauphin; Tahiti	17.40 m (SB)	Nathaniel Sulupo; Samoa	16.07 m (SB)	
Discus throw	Stephen Mailagi; Wallis and Futuna	50.03 m (PB)	Selevasio-Ryan Valao; Wallis and Futuna	49.54 m	Nathaniel Sulupo; Samoa	48.03 m	
Hammer throw	Erwan Cassier ^{a} New Caledonia	57.19 m (SB)	Petelo Toto; New Caledonia	54.85 m	Debono Paraka; Papua New Guinea	36.57 m	
Javelin throw	Felise Vaha'i Sosaia; Wallis and Futuna	62.41 m (PB)	Laurence Faapoi Tasi; Samoa	53.53 m	Lakona Gerega; Papua New Guinea	52.72 m	
Decathlon	Florian Geffrouais; New Caledonia	7419 pts (GR)	Karo Iga; Papua New Guinea	6643 pts	Timona Poareu; Tahiti	6521 pts	

Para events

Event	Gold		Silver		Bronze		Ref
100 m ambulant	Sylvain Bova (T11); New Caledonia	11.86	Steven Abraham (T46); Papua New Guinea	11.78	Falicien Siapo (T44); New Caledonia	12.87	
Shot put seated	Thierry Cibone (F37); New Caledonia	9.45 m	Marcelin Walico (F57); New Caledonia	11.12 m	Timothy Shadrack (F54); Solomon Islands	6.74 m	
Javelin ambulant	Thierry Washetine (T/F20); New Caledonia	44.46 m	Ken Kahu (T/F44); Vanuatu	46.61 m	Iosefo Rakesa (F44); Fiji	31.90 m	

=== Women's results ===
The pole vault event for women was not contested.

Event	Gold		Silver		Bronze		Ref
100 m (wind: -0.4 m/s)	Toea Wisil; Papua New Guinea	11.56^{b}	Heleina Young; Fiji	11.82	Leonie Beu; Papua New Guinea	11.94	
200 m (wind: 2.4 m/s)	Toea Wisil; Papua New Guinea	23.45	Heleina Young; Fiji	24.01	Leonie Beu; Papua New Guinea	24.40	
400 m	Toea Wisil; Papua New Guinea	53.90	Leonie Beu; Papua New Guinea	55.71	Hereiti Bernardino; Tahiti	56.35	
800 m	Keely Small; Australia	2:10.53 (GR)	Donna Koniel; Papua New Guinea	2:14.17	Jenny Albert; Papua New Guinea	2:16.30	
1500 m	Poro Gahekave; Papua New Guinea	4:42.04 (PB)	Genina Criss; Guam	4:51.36	Lyanne Tibu; Papua New Guinea	4:52.04	
5000 m	Poro Gahekave; Papua New Guinea	18:27.46 (PB)	Mary Tenge; Papua New Guinea	19:14.50	Dianah Matekali; Solomon Islands	19:31.38	
10000 m	Sharon Firisua; Solomon Islands	41:19.92	Margaret Kuras; Vanuatu	42:14.65	Dianah Matekali; Solomon Islands	42:27.90	
Half marathon	Margaret Kuras; Vanuatu	1:29:55	Dianah Matekali; Solomon Islands	1:30:10	Sharon Firisua; Solomon Islands	1:32:36	
100 m hurdles (wind: +0.1 m/s)	Brianna Beahan; Australia	13.17 (GR)	Adrine Monagi; Papua New Guinea	13.99	Esther Wejieme; New Caledonia	14.25	
400 m hurdles	Donna Koniel; Papua New Guinea	1:00.14	Ana Kaloucava Baleveicau; Fiji	1:01.01 (NR)	Annie Topal; Papua New Guinea	1:02.39	
3000 m steeplechase	Poro Gahekave; Papua New Guinea	11:38.42	Mary Tenge; Papua New Guinea	11:59.25	Alison Bowman; Guam^{c}	12:15.65	
4 × 100 m relay	Fiji; Younis Bese; Elenani Tinai; Makereta Naulu; Heleina Young	45.76	Papua New Guinea; Adrine Monagi; Leonie Beu; Nancy Malamut; Toea Wisil	45.97 (NR)	Vanuatu; Roslyn Nalin; Lyza Malres; Lesbeth Kalopong; Nerry Bongnaim	50.34	
4 × 400 m relay	Papua New Guinea; Leonie Beu; Isila Apkup; Donna Koniel; Toea Wisil	3:44.86	Fiji; Heleina Young; Ana Baleveicau; Serenia Ragatu; Elenani Tinai	3:46.72	Vanuatu; Valentine Hello; Lesbeth Kalopong; Lyza Malres; Roslyn Nalin	3:59.54	
High jump	Shawntell Lockington; Fiji	1.68 m	Rellie Kaputin; Papua New Guinea	1.65 m	Candice Richer; Tahiti	1.59 m	
Long jump	Rellie Kaputin; Papua New Guinea	6.15 m (+0.0 m/s)	Annie Topal; Papua New Guinea	5.68 m (+1.3 m/s)	Lyza Malres; Vanuatu	5.55 m (+0.7 m/s)	
Triple jump	Annie Topal; Papua New Guinea	12.91 m (-3.7 m/s)	Rellie Kaputin; Papua New Guinea	12.44 m (-2.5 m/s)	Candice Richer; Tahiti	11.45 m (-1.8 m/s)	
Shot put	ʻAta Maama Tuutafaiva; Tonga	16.61 m (PB)	Nuuausala Tuilefano; American Samoa	13.12 m	Vaihina Doucet; Tahiti	12.63 m	
Discus throw	Lesly Filituulaga; New Caledonia	45.41 m	Tereapii Tapoki; Cook Islands	44.63 m	ʻAta Maama Tuutafaiva; Tonga	40.39 m	
Hammer throw	Alexandra Hulley; Australia	64.37 m (GR)	Ellise Takosi; New Caledonia	51.73 m	Jacklyn Travertz; Papua New Guinea	47.99 m (NR)	
Javelin throw	Sharon Toako; Papua New Guinea	47.13 m	Linda Selui; New Caledonia	45.49 m	Gwoelani Patu; Tahiti	42.17 m	
Heptathlon	Elenani Tinai; Fiji	4550 pts	Raylynne Kanam; Papua New Guinea	4101 pts	Edna Boafob; Papua New Guinea	3848 pts	

Para events

Event	Gold		Silver		Bronze		Ref
100 m ambulant	Joanne Lhuillery (T/F46); New Caledonia	13.88	Rose Vandegou (T/F41); New Caledonia	21.69	Marcelline Moli (T/F46); Vanuatu	15.26	
Shot put ambulant	Naibili Vatunisolo (F42); Fiji	7.83 m	Rose Vandegou (T/F41); New Caledonia	7.05 m	Elie Enock (T/F42); Vanuatu	6.71 m	
Javelin ambulant	Rose Vandegou (T/F41); New Caledonia	22.14 m	Elie Enock (T/F42); Vanuatu	13.56 m	Jeminah Otoa (T/F46); Solomon Islands	18.25 m	

== Notes ==
^ a Erwan Cassier dedicated his win to his late father, Frédéric Cassier, who won the title in Apia, in 1983.

^ b Toea Wisil broke the women's 100 metre games record in her first round heat clocking 11.50 seconds. The previous record was 11.55 seconds.

^ c The women's 3000m steeplechase only had 3 entries. Therefore according to the Samoa 2019 Athletics technical manual section 9.3, only gold and silver will be awarded in events with such cases.

== See also ==
- Athletics at the Pacific Games
