= Tesi =

Tesi is a surname. Notable people with the surname include:

- Henri Tesi (1903–?), French racing cyclist
- Luciano Tesi (born 1931), Italian astronomer
- Mauro Antonio Tesi (1730–1766), Italian painter
- Riccardo Tesi (born 1956), Italian musician
- Tesi Niu (born 2001), Tongan international rugby league footballer
- Vittoria Tesi (fl. 18th century), Italian opera singer

== See also ==
- Təsi, village in Azerbaijan
