= Sililo =

Sililo is a given name. Notable people with the name include:

- Sililo Figota (born 1965), Samoan male boxer
- Sililo Kivalu (born 1999), Wallisian athlete
- Sililo Martens (born 1977), Tongan rugby union player
