= Berkeley Square, Bristol =

Area in Bristol, England

Berkeley Square
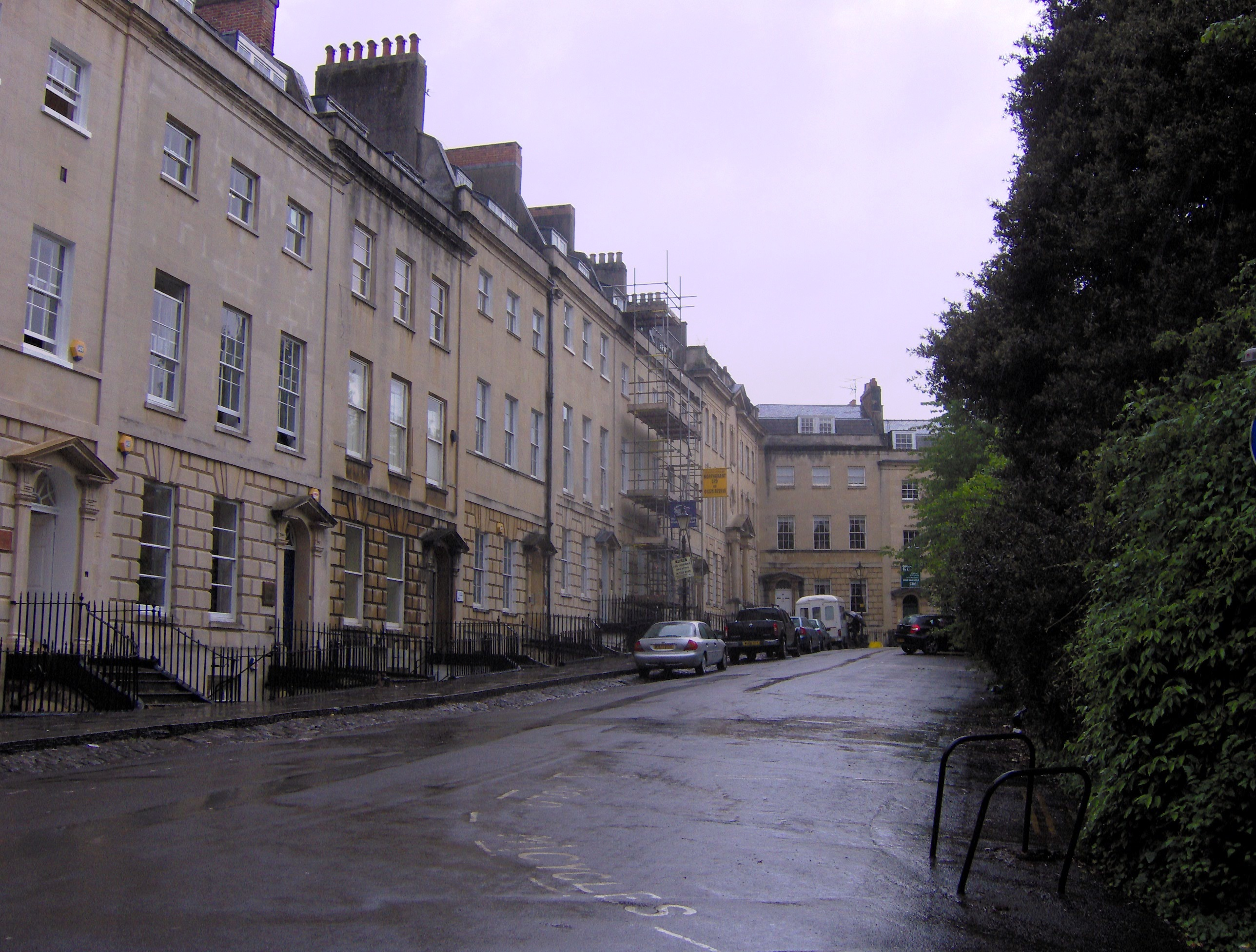
- East side

- Location within Bristol
- Location: Clifton, Bristol, England
- Coordinates: 51.455204°N 2.605816°W
- OS grid: ST580730

Berkeley Square is an area close to Park Street in the Clifton area of Bristol, England, that includes buildings and a central area of greenery.

It was laid out around 1790 in Georgian style with a central grass area behind railings, by Thomas and William Paty. Nos. 12–18 were damaged during the Bristol Blitz in World War II and were rebuilt to maintain the same facade.

Many of the buildings are now owned and used by the University of Bristol; these include the Institute for Learning and Research Technology (ILRT) and the Technical Advisory Service for Images (TASI); while others are hotels and offices.

No. 24 was used as the main exterior in the BBC television drama The House of Eliott.

== Notable residents ==
- Sir Frank William Wills Kt (1852–1932), who was a member of the WD & HO Wills tobacco family, and Lord Mayor of Bristol in 1911, resided at Nos. 15/16 Berkeley Square (now The Berkeley Square Hotel)
- Thomas Daniel (merchant) (1762–1854) who was a sugar merchant, and known as the 'King of Bristol' for his omnipotence in Bristol's civic life for over 50 years, lived at No. 20 Berkeley Square from the early 1800s until his death (now the University and Literary Club)

== Architecture ==
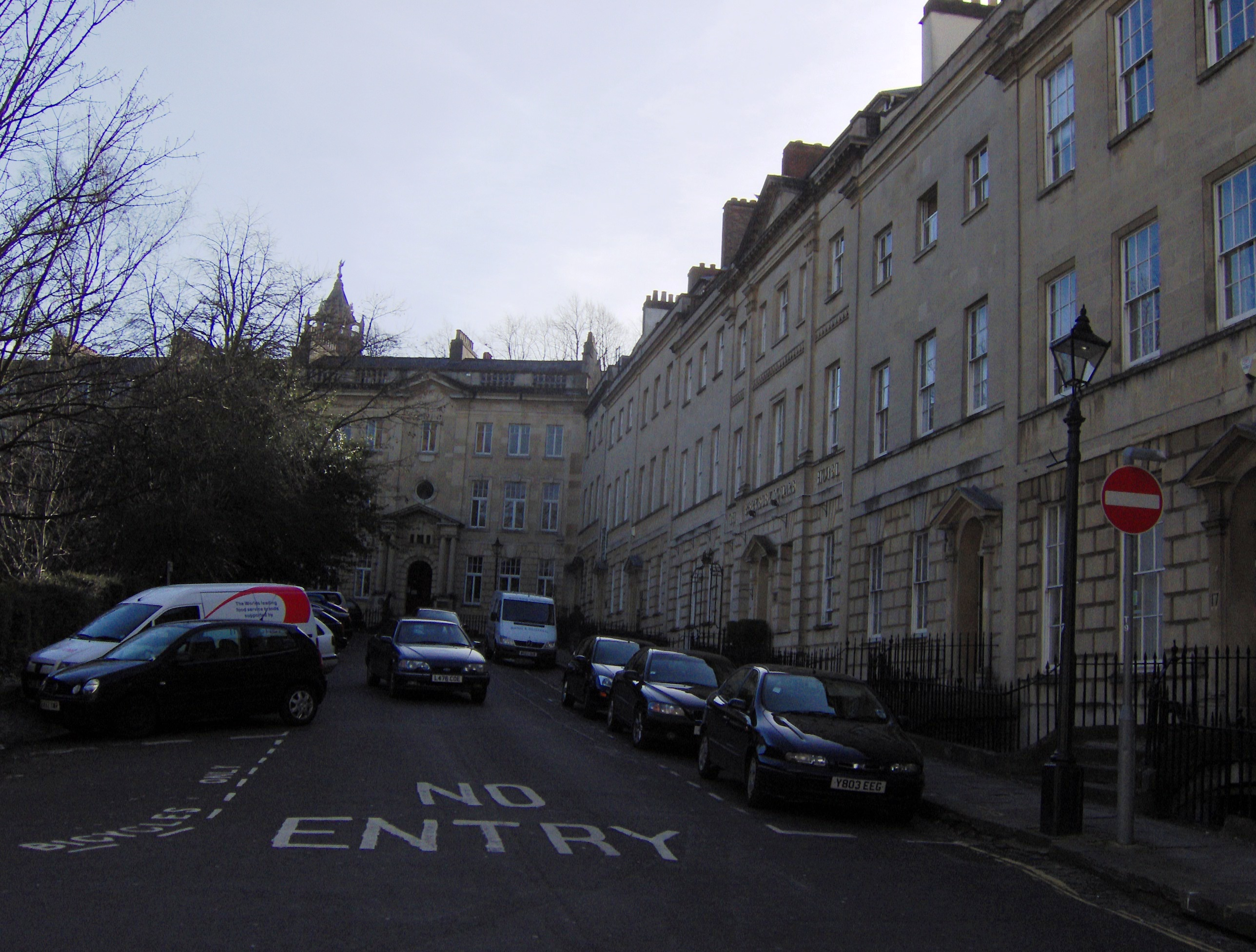
West and North sides of Berkeley Square

Many of the buildings have Grade II* listed building status:

- Nos. 1–8
- Nos. 11–19
- Nos. 20–30

== High Cross ==
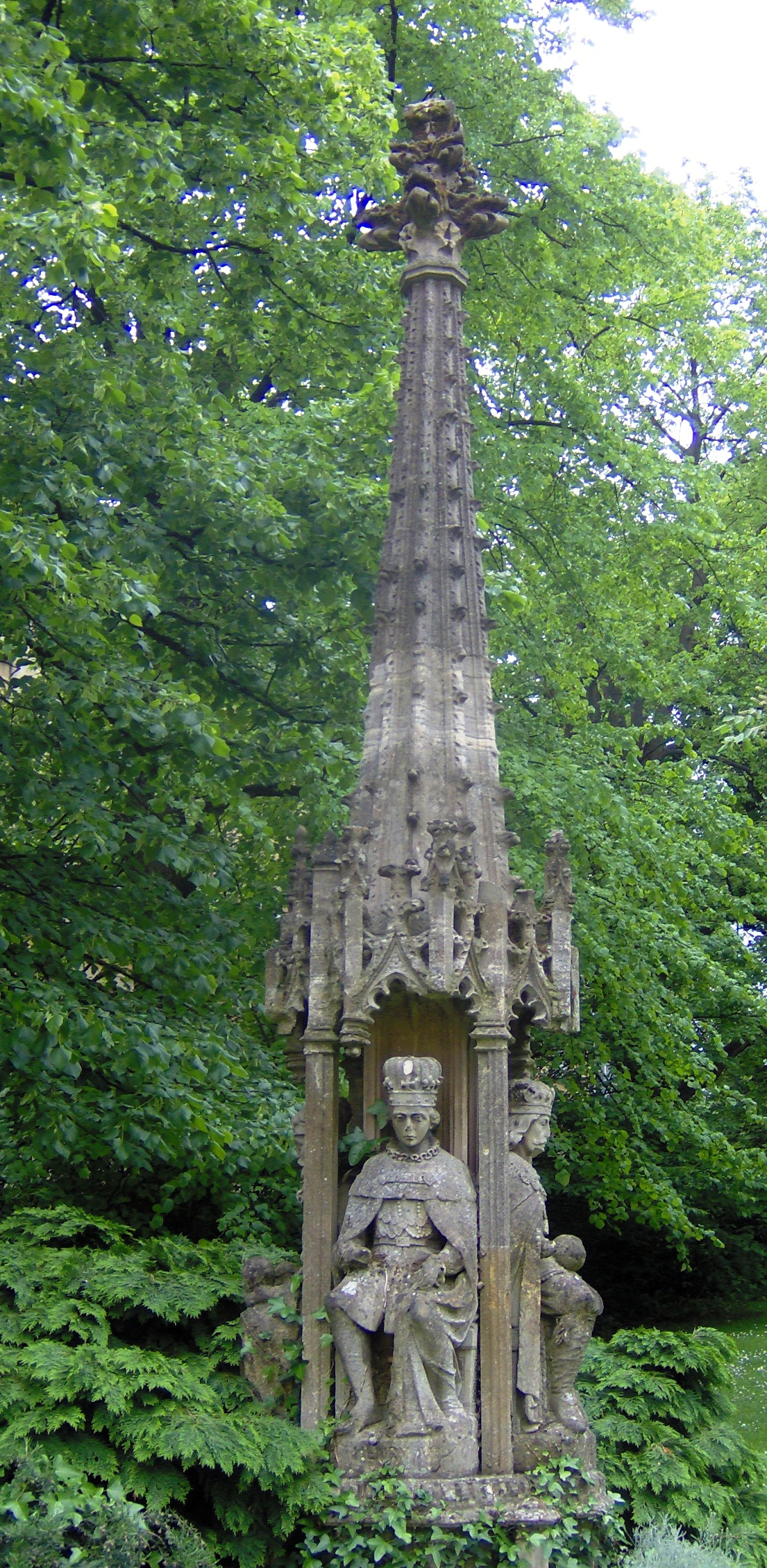
High Cross replica in the gardens

The statue in the gardens is a replica of the Bristol High Cross which was erected in the city in 1373 honouring various British monarchs, and moved to College Green in 1733. The statue was given in 1768 to Stourhead gardens and can be seen there today. The current statue is a replica which was originally sited on College Green was made by John Norton in 1851 and removed in the late 1940s. The Bristol Civic Society purchased the remains in 1950 and re-erected the truncated remains seen today in Berkeley Square.

== See also ==
- Grade II* listed buildings in Bristol
