= Triathlon at the 2015 Pacific Games =

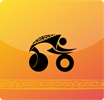
- Triathlon pictogram for the Games
- Venue: Harbour City, Port Moresby
- Dates: 5 July

Triathlon at the 2015 Pacific Games in Port Moresby, Papua New Guinea was held on July 5, 2015.

== Medal summary ==
=== Medal table ===
Rank	Nation	Gold	Silver	Bronze	Total
1	New Caledonia	3	0	2	5
2	(French Polynesia) Tahiti	0	3	0	3
3	Guam	0	0	1	1
Totals (3 entries)		3	3	3	9

=== Results ===
Event	Gold		Silver		Bronze	
Men's sprint	Audric Lucini; New Caledonia	59:04	Benjamin Zorgnotti; Tahiti	1:02:11	Mathieu Szalamacha; New Caledonia	1:03:41
Women's sprint	Charlotte Robin; New Caledonia	1:06:30	Salome de Marmorieres; Tahiti	1:06:49	Céline Grymonprez; New Caledonia	1:08:39
Mixed team sprint	New Caledonia; Audric Lucini; Charlotte Robin; Mathieu Szalamacha	5 pts	French Polynesia; Benjamin Zorgnotti; Salome De Barthez De Marmorieres; Keanu Lorfevre	9 pts	Guam; Patrick Comacho; Peter Lombard II; Ayshalynn Perez	25 pts

== See also ==
- Triathlon at the Pacific Games
