= Mosese Foliaki =

Tongan athlete

Personal information
- Born: 25 November 1998

Sport
- Country: Tonga
- Sport: Athletics
Medal record
Men's Athletics
Representing Tonga
Pacific Games
| Gold medal – first place | 2019 Apia | 110m hurdles |
| Gold medal – first place | 2019 Apia | High jump |
Pacific Mini Games
| Silver medal – second place | 2017 Port Vila | Pole vault |
| Bronze medal – third place | 2017 Port Vila | High jump |

Mosese Foliaki (born November 25, 1998) is a Tongan athlete who competes in the hurdles, high jump, and pole vault. He has represented Tonga at the Pacific Games and Pacific Mini Games.

At the 2017 Pacific Mini Games in Port Vila he won silver in the pole vault, and bronze in the high jump. At the 2019 Pacific Games in Apia he won gold in both the 110 metres hurdles and the high jump. Following the games he was granted land in Vavaʻu by governor Lord Fakatulolo.

Foliaki was working as a Mormon missionary on Nomuka during the 2022 Hunga Tonga–Hunga Ha'apai eruption and tsunami, and was involved in rescue efforts after the tsunami.
