= Siueni Filimone =

Tongan sprinter (born 1994)

Personal information
- Born: 19 August 1994 (age 31) Hihifo, Haapai, Tonga
- Height: 1.73 m (5 ft 8 in)
- Weight: 69 kg (152 lb)

Sport
- Country: Tonga
- Sport: Athletics
- Event: 100m
Medal record
Pacific Mini Games
Bronze medal – third place	2013 Mata-Utu	4x100m relay
Oceania Championships
Silver medal – second place	2013 Papeete	100 m
Silver medal – second place	2012 Cairns	4x100m relay
Bronze medal – third place	2014 Rarotonga	4x100m relay

Siueni Filimone (born 19 August 1994) is a Tongan sprinter. He competed in the 100 metres event at the 2013 World Championships in Athletics. He competed at the 2016 Summer Olympics. He progressed from the preliminary round with a time of 10.76s, but he did not start in Round 1.

== Personal bests ==
Event	Result	Venue	Date
100 m	10.72 s (wind: -0.8 m/s)	(United Kingdom) Glasgow	27 July 2014
200 m	22.19 s (wind: +0.7 m/s)	(Australia) Cairns	29 June 2012

== Competition record ==
Year	Competition	Venue	Position	Event	Notes
Representing Tonga
2012	Oceania Junior Championships (Regional Division East)	Cairns, Australia	3rd	100m	11.19 (wind: +0.1 m/s)
2012	Oceania Junior Championships (Regional Division East)	Cairns, Australia	2nd	200m	22.55 (wind: +0.6 m/s)
2012	Oceania Championships (Regional Division East)	Cairns, Australia	2nd	4 × 100 m relay	43.16
2012	World Junior Championships	Barcelona, Spain	61st (h)	100 m	11.41 (wind: -1.6 m/s)
2013	Oceania Championships	Papeete, French Polynesia	2nd	100m	11.17 (wind: -1.0 m/s)
2013	Oceania Championships	Papeete, French Polynesia	8th	200m	23.36 (wind: -1.5 m/s)
2013	World Championships	Moscow, Russia	61st (pr)	100 m	10.93 (wind: -0.4 m/s)
2013	Pacific Mini Games	Mata-Utu, Wallis and Futuna	4th	100m	10.87 (wind: 0.0 m/s)
2013	Pacific Mini Games	Mata-Utu, Wallis and Futuna	8th	200m	23.33 (wind: -2.6 m/s)
2013	Pacific Mini Games	Mata-Utu, Wallis and Futuna	3rd	4 × 100 m relay	42.59
2013	Pacific Mini Games	Mata-Utu, Wallis and Futuna	6th	4 × 400 m relay	3:29.66
2014	Commonwealth Games	Glasgow, United Kingdom	38th (h)	100m	10.72 (wind: -0.8 m/s)
2014	Oceania Championships	Rarotonga, Cook Islands	5th	100m	11.06 (wind: -0.2 m/s)
2014	Oceania Championships	Rarotonga, Cook Islands	3rd	4 × 100 m relay	42.77
2015	Oceania Championships	Cairns, Australia	18th (sf)	100m	11.34 (wind: +0.2 m/s)
2015	Oceania Championships	Cairns, Australia	14th (sf)	200m	22.51 (wind: -0.1 m/s)
2015	Oceania Championships	Cairns, Australia	5th	4 × 100 m relay	42.77
2015	Oceania Championships	Cairns, Australia	—	Mixed 800m sprint medley relay	DQ
2016	World Indoor Championships	Portland, United States	49th (h)	60 m	7.08
2016	Olympic Games	Rio de Janeiro, Brazil	4th (p)	100 m	10.76^{1}

^{1}Did not start in the heats
