= French Polynesia at the 2009 World Championships in Athletics =

- WA code: PYF

in Berlin
- Competitors: 2 (1 man, 1 woman)
- Medals: Gold 0 Silver 0 Bronze 0 Total 0

World Championships in Athletics appearances
- 1993; 1995; 1997; 1999; 2001; 2003; 2005; 2007; 2009; 2011; 2013; 2015; 2017; 2019; 2022; 2023; 2025

French Polynesia competes at the 2009 World Championships in Athletics from 15–23 August in Berlin.

== Team selection ==
Track and road events

Event	Athletes	
Event	Men	Women
100 metres		Terani Faremiro
110 metre hurdles	Toriki Urarii	

== Results ==
=== Men ===
Track and road events

Event	Athletes	Heats		Semifinal		Final	
Event	Athletes	Result	Rank	Result	Rank	Result	Rank
110 m hurdles	Toriki Urarii	15.01 SB	45	did not advance			

=== Women ===
Track and road events

Event	Athletes	Heats		Quarterfinal		Semifinal		Final	
Event	Athletes	Result	Rank	Result	Rank	Result	Rank	Result	Rank
100 m	Terani Faremiro	12.96 PB	50	did not advance					
