= Afure Adah =

Papua New Guinean sprinter (born 1997)

Personal information
- Born: 9 September 1997 (age 28) Port Moresby, Papua New Guinea
- Height: 173 cm (5 ft 8 in)
- Weight: 57 kg (126 lb)

Sport
- Country: Papua New Guinea
- Event: Sprints
- College team: Minnesota State Mavericks

Achievements and titles
- Personal best(s): 100 Metres: 11.77s 200 Metres: 24.15s
Medal record
Women's Athletics
Representing Papua New Guinea
Pacific Games
Gold medal – first place	2015 Port Moresby	4 × 400 m relay
Pacific Mini Games
Silver medal – second place	2017 Port Vila	4 × 100 m relay
Bronze medal – third place	2017 Port Vila	200 m

Afure Adah (born 9 September 1997) is a Papua New Guinean sprinter. She competed in the women's 100 metres and 200 metres at the 2018 Commonwealth Games.

== Personal bests ==
Outdoor

Discipline	Performance	Place	Date
100 metres	11.77 (+0.2)	St. Paul (United States)	13 May 2017
200 metres	24.15 (0.0)	St. Paul (United States)	13 May 2017
400 meters	56.66	Long Beach (United States)	21 April 2018

Indoor

Discipline	Performance	Place	Date
60 metres	7.59 NR	Mankato (United States)	25 February 2017
200 metres	24.40 NR	Birmingham, AL (United States)	10 March 2017
400 metres	56.57	Mankato (United States)	16 February 2018

- All information taken from IAAF profile.
