= Kevin Pio =

Solomon Island athletics competitor (born 1995)

Personal information
- Full name: Kevin Pio
- Born: 28 July 1995 (age 31) Honiara, Solomon Islands
- Height: 162 cm (5 ft 4 in)
- Weight: 62 kg (137 lb)

Sport
- Country: Solomon Islands
- Sport: Track and field
- Event: 100 metre

Achievements and titles
- Personal best: 100 metre - 11.54 seconds

Kevin Pio (born 28 July 1995 in Honiara) is a track and field sprinter from the Solomon Islands. He competed at the 2018 Commonwealth Games in the 100 m event drafted into heat three. He ran his race in 11.54 seconds, beating only Sharry Dodin from Seychelles who had been disqualified for a false start, and therefore Pio didn't advance to the quarterfinals.

Pio also competed at the 2015 Pacific Games in Port Moresby, Papua New Guinea. He competed in the 100 m event running 11.75 seconds and failing to qualify to the next round. Pio also competed in the 200 metres and ran the race in 24.07 seconds, he qualified to the semifinals as a fastest loser. In the semifinals, Pio managed to run another 24.07 second time, but this time, was unable to advance to the finals, finishing 11th overall. Along with Mathew Sukulu, Alfred Iisia, and Emmanuel Maefigo Tautaumae, Pio participated in the 4 x 100 m relay in which the team came 7th running 43.59 seconds. Pio was the fourth and last leg for the Solomon Islands team.
