= Selevasio-Ryan Valao =

Wallisian athlete

Sport
- Country: Wallis and Futuna
- Sport: Shot put / Discus throw
Medal record
Men's Shot put / Discus throw
Representing Wallis and Futuna
Pacific Games
Silver medal – second place	2019 Apia	Discus
Pacific Mini Games
Gold medal – first place	2017 Port Vila	Shot put
Silver medal – second place	2017 Port Vila	Discus

Selevasio-Ryan Valao (born 7 January 1998) is a Wallisian athlete who has represented Wallis and Futuna at the Pacific Games and Pacific Mini Games.

At the 2017 Pacific Mini Games in Port Vila he won gold in the shot put and silver in the discus.

At the 2019 Pacific Games in Apia he won silver in the discus.
