= Benjamin Zorgnotti =

French Polynesian triathlete and long-distance runner

Personal information
- Born: 26 September 1994 Toulon, France

Sport
- Country: French Polynesia
- Sport: Triathlon
Medal record
Men's Triathlon
Representing Tahiti
Pacific Mini Games
Gold medal – first place	2022 Saipan	5000m
Gold medal – first place	2022 Saipan	Half-marathon
Gold medal – first place	2022 Saipan	Aquathon
Gold medal – first place	2022 Saipan	Triathlon
Pacific Games
Gold medal – first place	2019 Apia	Aquathon
Gold medal – first place	2019 Apia	Triathlon
Silver medal – second place	2015 Port Moresby	Triathlon

Benjamin Zorgnotti (born 26 September 1994) is a French Polynesian triathlete and Long-distance runner who has represented French Polynesia at the Pacific Games and Pacific Mini Games.

Zorgnotti was born in Toulon in France and trained in engineering. He has been doing triathlon since he was six years old. He worked for Airbus in Toulouse before focusing on triathlon full-time.

At the 2015 Pacific Games in Port Moresby he won silver. At the 2019 Pacific Games in Apia he won gold in the triathlon and aquathon. In June 2022 he came 12th in the Africa Triathlon Cup. At the 2022 Pacific Mini Games in Saipan he won gold in the 5000 metres, half-marathon, triathlon, and aquathon.
