= Nick Joseph =

Saint Lucian track and field athlete

Personal information
- Full name: Nick Junior Joseph
- Born: 21 March 1998 (age 28) Choiseul, Saint Lucia

Sport
- Country: Saint Lucia
- Sport: Track and field
- Event(s): 100 metre, 200 metre

Achievements and titles
- Personal best: 100 metre - 10.70 seconds 200 metre - 22.16 seconds

Nick Joseph (born 21 March 1998 in Choiseul) is a Saint Lucian track and field athlete who specializes in the 100 metres and the 200 metres. He competed for Saint Lucia at the 2018 Commonwealth Games and the 2018 IAAF World Indoor Championships. At the 2018 Commonwealth Games, Joseph competed in the men's 100 m in which he was drafted into heat two. As they were almost about to commence the race, the race was stopped after Joseph committed a false start, he was later disqualified and wasn't able to advance through to the later rounds. Joseph also competed at the 2018 IAAF World Indoor Championships in the 60 metre event. He ran the race in a time of 7.07 seconds, a personal best, but finished seventh out of eight sprinters and this wasn't enough to advance to the later rounds.
