= French Polynesia at the 2023 World Athletics Championships =

- Flag of French Polynesia
- WA code: PYF

in Budapest, Hungary 19 August 2023 – 27 August 2023
- Competitors: 1 (1 man and 0 women)
- Medals: Gold 0 Silver 0 Bronze 0 Total 0

World Athletics Championships appearances
- 1993; 1995; 1997; 1999; 2001; 2003; 2005; 2007; 2009; 2011; 2013; 2015; 2017; 2019; 2022; 2023; 2025

French Polynesia competed at the 2023 World Athletics Championships in Budapest, Hungary, which were held from 19 to 27 August 2023. The athlete delegation of the country was composed of one competitor, sprinter Manuihei Teaha who competed in the men's 100 metres. He qualified for the Championships upon being selected by the Fédération d'Athlétisme de Polynésie Française. In his event, he placed sixth in his preliminary, set a personal best, and failed to advance further.

== Background ==
The 2023 World Athletics Championships in Budapest, Hungary, were held from 19 to 27 August 2023. The Championships were held at the National Athletics Centre. To qualify for the World Championships, athletes had to reach an entry standard (e.g. time or distance), place in a specific position at select competitions, be a wild card entry, or qualify through their World Athletics Ranking at the end of the qualification period.

As French Polynesia did not meet any of the four standards, they could send either one male or one female athlete in one event of the Championships who has not yet qualified. The Fédération d'Athlétisme de Polynésie Française selected sprinter Manuihei Teaha, who would compete in the men's 100 metres. During his selection, he was unranked in the event within the World Athletics Rankings. Previously, he competed at the 2022 Oceania Athletics Championships in the long jump and triple jump. At 15 years of age, he was one of the youngest competitors at the Championships.

== Results ==
Key

- Q = Qualified for the next round
- q = Qualified for the next round as a fastest loser or, in field events, by position without achieving the qualifying target
- NR = National record
- PB = Personal best
- SB = Season best
- N/A = Round not applicable for the event

=== Men ===
Teaha competed in the third preliminary heat on 19 August against seven other sprinters. There, he recorded a personal best time of 11.66 seconds and placed sixth, failing to advance further as only the top two of each heat and the two next fastest would only be able to do so.

Track and road events

Athlete	Event	Preliminary		Heat		Semifinal		Final	
Athlete	Event	Result	Rank	Result	Rank	Result	Rank	Result	Rank
Manuihei Teaha	100 metres	11.66 PB	6	Did not advance					
