= Stephen Headley =

Barbadian track and field athlete

Personal information
- Full name: Stephen Arlington William Headley
- Nationality: Barbadian
- Born: 24 January 1988 (age 38) Pennsylvania, United States
- Height: 1.83 m (6 ft 0 in)
- Weight: 88 kg (194 lb)

Sport
- Country: Barbados
- Sport: Track and field
- Event(s): 100 metres, 200 metres

Achievements and titles
- Personal best: 100 metres - 10.33 seconds 200 metres - 21.10 seconds

Stephen Headley (born 24 January 1988 in Pennsylvania) is a track and field sprinter who competed for Barbados at the 2010 Commonwealth Games and the 2018 Commonwealth Games.

== Commonwealth Games ==
Headley first competed at the 2010 Commonwealth Games for Barbados in the men's 100 metres event. He comfortable qualified through heat three with a time of 10.56 seconds finished 3rd behind Emmanuel Callander and Ramone McKenzie respectively. He once again qualified through the round two phase of the competition finishing 3rd equal with a time of 10.40 seconds, his race included Callander and McKenzie (which he drew too) once again. However, in his semi-finals, he wasn't as lucky. Headley finished 7th out of eight competitors with a time of 10.67 seconds, this time he beat Ramone McKenzie, who failed to start. This meant that Headley's 2010 Commonwealth Games rally was over.

Headley unfortunately missed out of the 2014 Commonwealth Games in Glasgow in which Barbados only qualified one sprinter for the men's 100 metre sprinter, Ramon Gittens.

Headley did manage to qualify for the 2018 Commonwealth Games. This time Headley was entered into the men's 100 metres and the 4 x 100 m relay events for Barbados. Headley's men's 100 metres rally did not go as successful this games as it did in Delhi. Headley was unable to make it past the heats after finishing 4th in heat three with a time of 10.70 seconds. In the 4 x 100 m relay, Headley competed alongside Shane Brathwaite, Nicholas Deshong and Burkheart Ellis Jr. They qualified through to the final as a fastest loser after coming 4th in heat 2 with a time of 38.95 seconds and a season's best. In the finals, they weren't able to capitalize on their previous time and finished 5th and medal-less after a 39.04 second race.
