= Gwoelani Patu =

French Polynesian athlete (born 2000)

Personal information
- Born: 10 September 2000

Sport
- Country: French Polynesia
- Sport: Javelin throw
Medal record
Women's Javelin throw
Representing Tahiti
Pacific Games
Bronze medal – third place	2019 Apia	Javelin
Bronze medal – third place	2015 Port Moresby	Javelin
Polynesian Championships in Athletics
Gold medal – first place	2016 Papeete	Javelin
Gold medal – first place	2016 Papeete	U18 Javelin

Mahine Gwoelani Patu (born 10 September 2000) is a French Polynesian athlete specialising in the javelin throw. She has represented French Polynesia at the Pacific Games and Polynesian Championships in Athletics.

At the 2015 Pacific Games in Port Moresby she won bronze in the javelin. At the 2019 Pacific Games in Apia she won bronze in the javelin.
