= French Polynesia at the 2011 World Championships in Athletics =

- WA code: PYF
- National federation: Fédération d'Athlétisme de Polynésie Française
- Website: www.fapf.pf

in Daegu
- Competitors: 1
- Medals: Gold 0 Silver 0 Bronze 0 Total 0

World Championships in Athletics appearances
- 1993; 1995; 1997; 1999; 2001; 2003; 2005; 2007; 2009; 2011; 2013; 2015; 2017; 2019; 2022; 2023; 2025

French Polynesia competed at the 2011 World Championships in Athletics from August 27 to September 4 in Daegu, South Korea. One athlete was announced to represent the country in the event.

== Results ==
=== Men ===
Event	Athletes	Heats		Semifinal		Final	
Event	Athletes	Result	Rank	Result	Rank	Result	Rank
Charles Delys	1500 metres	3:51.36 SB	33	Did not advance			
