= Cedric Wane =

French Polynesian triathlete and long-distance runner

Personal information
- Born: 31 January 1986 (age 37) Papeete, French Polynesia

Sport
- Country: French Polynesia
- Sport: Triathlon
Medal record
Men's Triathlon
Representing Tahiti
Pacific Games
Gold medal – first place	2019 Apia	Aquathon mixed-team

Cedric Wane (born 31 January 1986) is a French Polynesian triathlete and Long-distance runner who has represented French Polynesia at the Pacific Games.

Wane was born in Papeete, and is of Chinese, Tahitian and Corsican descent. He was educated at the University of Colorado Boulder in America, obtaining a master's degree in mathematics. On returning to Tahiti, he managed a restaurant. He is a vegan.

At the 2016 Polynesian Championships in Athletics he won bronze in the 10,000 meters.

In 2017 he became a professional, competing in a number of XTERRA Triathlons.

In 2017 he won the inaugural Relais des Copains cycle race, the Teva i Uta triathlon and the Tri nature de Moorea.

At the 2019 Pacific Games in Apia he won gold in the mixed-team Aquathon.

In 2021 he returned to mountain biking, winning the VTT/VAE challenge.

In May 2023 he won the 2023 Polynesian Aquathlon Championships in Tahiti.
