= Salome De Barthez De Marmorieres =

French Polynesian triathlete (born 1997)

Personal information
- Born: 20 July 1997 Papeete, French Polynesia

Sport
- Country: French Polynesia
- Sport: Triathlon
Medal record
Women's Triathlon
Representing Tahiti
Pacific Games
Gold medal – first place	2019 Apia	Aquathon
Silver medal – second place	2019 Apia	Triathlon
Silver medal – second place	2015 Port Moresby	Triathlon

Salome De Barthez De Marmorieres (born 20 July 1997) is a French Polynesian triathlete who has represented French Polynesia at the Pacific Games.

De Barthez De Marmorieres was born in Papeete in Tahiti and has been practicing triathlon since the age of eleven. She studied engineering and management at the École centrale de Nantes and Audencia Business School.

At the 2015 Pacific Games in Port Moresby she won silver in the triathlon. At the 2019 Pacific Games in Apia she won gold in the aquathon and silver in the triathlon.
