= Candice Richer =

French Polynesian athlete (born 2000)

Personal information
- Born: 28 November 2000

Sport
- Country: French Polynesia
- Sport: High jump
Medal record
Women's High jump
Representing Tahiti
Pacific Games
Bronze medal – third place	2019 Apia	High jump
Bronze medal – third place	2019 Apia	Triple jump
Polynesian Championships in Athletics
Gold medal – first place	2016 Papeete	Long jump
Bronze medal – third place	2016 Papeete	U18 Long jump

Candice Richer (born 28 November 2000) is a French Polynesian athlete specialising in the high jump and triple jump. She has represented French Polynesia at the Pacific Games and Polynesian Championships in Athletics.

Richer began athletics training in 2014.

At the 2019 Pacific Games in Apia she won bronze in the high jump and triple jump.
