= Talatala Po'oi =

Tongan field athlete (born 1997)

Personal information
- Born: 30 March 1997 (age 29) Neiafu, Tonga

Sport
- Country: Tonga
- Sport: Athletics
Medal record
Men's Athletics
Representing Tonga
Pacific Games
| Silver medal – second place | 2019 Apia | 110m hurdles |
Pacific Mini Games
| Gold medal – first place | 2017 Port Vila | 110m hurdles |
| Bronze medal – third place | 2017 Port Vila | 400m hurdles |

Talatala oe Toetu Po'oi (born 30 March 1997) is a Tongan Athlete who has represented Tonga at the Commonwealth Games, Pacific Games, and Pacific Mini Games. He has also been a member of the Tonga national under-20 football team.

Po'oi is from Neiafu in the province of Vavaʻu. In 2016 he was selected as a member of the Tonga national under-20 football team for the 2016 OFC U-20 Championship. He played in the match against the Cook Islands.

At the 2017 Pacific Mini Games in Port Vila he won gold in the 110 metres hurdles and bronze in the 400 metres hurdles. At the 2019 Pacific Games in Apia he won silver in the 110 metres hurdles. Following the games he was granted land in Vavaʻu by governor Lord Fakatulolo.

In 2018 he competed in the 110m hurdles at the 2018 Commonwealth Games on the Gold Coast in Australia, coming 8th in his heat.
