= Timona Poareu =

French Polynesian athlete (born 1999)

Personal information
- Born: 26 August 1999

Sport
- Country: French Polynesia
- Sport: Athletics
Medal record
Men's Athletics
Representing Tahiti
Pacific Games
Silver medal – second place	2019 Apia	Pole vault
Bronze medal – third place	2019 Apia	Decathlon
Polynesian Championships in Athletics
Silver medal – second place	2016 Papeete	Long jump
Gold medal – first place	2016 Papeete	U18 Long jump
Gold medal – first place	2016 Papeete	U18 Triple jump
Bronze medal – third place	2016 Papeete	U18 200m

Timona Poareu (born 26 August 1999) is a French Polynesian athlete specialising in the pole vault and Decathlon. He has represented French Polynesia at the Pacific Games and Polynesian Championships in Athletics.

At the 2019 Pacific Games in Apia he won bronze in the decathlon and silver in the pole-vault.
