= Emma Knight =

Canadian writer

Emma Knight is a Canadian writer from Toronto, Ontario, whose debut novel The Life Cycle of the Common Octopus was shortlisted for the 2025 Giller Prize. The novel was the Read with Jenna book club pick of January 2025.

== Education ==
Knight earned a bachelor's degree in linguistics from the University of Edinburgh. She has master's degrees in journalism in international development from Sciences Po in Paris. During her studies she contributed articles to the International Herald Tribune.

== Career ==
In 2014 Knight was the co-founder, with her husband Anthony Green, of Greenhouse, an organic juice company; she quit the company in 2023 after receiving the book deal for her first novel, but still occasionally works with the company. She co-wrote the cookbooks How to Eat with One Hand: Recipes and Other Nourishment for New and Expectant Parents (2017) and The Greenhouse Cookbook (2021).

Her first novel, The Life Cycle of the Common Octopus, was released in January 2025. It became a New York Times Best Seller and a Read with Jenna book club pick. A television show based on the series is in development from Metro-Goldwyn-Mayer Television.

Knight's writing has appeared in Literary Hub, Vogue, The Globe and Mail, The Walrus, and The New York Times. She co-hosts the podcast Fanfare with Monica Ainley de la Villardière.

== Personal life ==
Knight lives in Toronto with her husband, Anthony Green, and two daughters.
