= 2007 Polynesian Championships in Athletics =

- Edition: 3rd
- Dates: October 16–17
- Host city: Rarotonga, Cook Islands
- Level: U19
- Events: 23 (12 men, 10 women, 1 mixed)
- Participation: 48 athletes from 5 nations
- Records set: 4 CR

The 2007 Polynesian Championships in Athletics took place between October 16–17, 2007. The event was held in Rarotonga, Cook Islands, in conjunction with the Cook Islands Secondary School Championships and the Cook Island National Track and Field Championships. It was open for athletes aged under 19. Detailed reports were given for the OAA, and for the French Polynesia Athletics Federation.

A total of 23 events were contested, 12 by men, 10 by women, and 1 mixed.

== Medal summary ==
Complete results can be found on the Oceania Athletics Association webpage, and results for the first day on the webpage of the French Polynesia Athletics Federation (Fédération d'Athlétisme de Polynésie Française).

=== Men ===
Event	First		Second		Third	
100 metres	Andy Lui; Tonga	11.2	Epeli Ika; Tonga	11.4	Edward Tomasi; Samoa	11.6
200 metres	Andy Lui; Tonga	22.9	Epeli Ika; Tonga	23.1	Edward Tomasi; Samoa	23.3
400 metres	Iulio Lafai; Samoa	53.1	Edward Tomasi; Samoa	55.0	Yann Follin; French Polynesia	56.3
800 metres	Iulio Lafai; Samoa	2:04.1	Valentin Laboube; French Polynesia	2:11.1	Yann Follin; French Polynesia	2:12.4
1500 metres	Justin Monier; French Polynesia	4.17.9 CR	Iulio Lafai; Samoa	4.25.9	Valentin Laboube; French Polynesia	4.40.2
5000 metres	Justin Monier; French Polynesia	18:23.0	Iulio Lafai; Samoa	18:41.0		
High jump	Aisea Vakameilalo; Tonga	1.90m CR	Kris Williamson; Cook Islands	1.73m	George Baxter; Cook Islands	1.64m
Long jump	Arthur Cognez; French Polynesia	5.94m	Hugh Henry; Cook Islands	5.93m	Junior Aifulu; Samoa	5.60m
Triple jump	Aisea Vakameilalo; Tonga	12.56m	Junior Aiulu; Samoa	12.04m		
Shot put	Mikaele Manuele; Samoa	14.91m	Ben Moimoi; Tonga	13.78m	Maara Tuare; Cook Islands	12.90m
Discus throw	Mikaele Manuele; Samoa	41.83m	Henry Taripo; Cook Islands	39.21m	Ben Moimoi; Tonga	37.53m
Javelin throw	Ioane Tamatoa; Cook Islands	41.81m	Penisimani Moimoi; Tonga	40.59m	Hugh Henry; Cook Islands	40.31m

=== Women ===
Event	First		Second		Third	
100 metres	Vasi Feke; Tonga	12.7 CR	Patricia Taea; Cook Islands	13.2	Lila Waetin; American Samoa	13.3
200 metres	Vasi Feke; Tonga	26.8	Patricia Taea; Cook Islands	27.5	Samantha Lockington; Cook Islands	27.6
800 metres	Manutahi Heimoana; French Polynesia	2:56.3				
1500 metres	Manutahi Heimoana; French Polynesia	5.54.2				
High jump	Unaloto Taukiuvea; Tonga	1.49m	Kalina Mamao; Tonga	1.35m		
Long jump	Kalina Mamao; Tonga	5.19m CR	Samantha Lockington; Cook Islands	5.04m	Patricia Taea; Cook Islands	4.79m
Triple jump	Kalina Mamao; Tonga	10.12m	Unaloto Taukiuvea; Tonga	9.49m	Rowena Faaiuaso; Samoa	9.07m
Shot put	Judy Tuara; Cook Islands	11.82m	Siloni Koloa; Tonga	11.18m	Dorothy Kiria; Cook Islands	10.01m
Discus throw	Siloni Koloa; Tonga	35.23m	Siaopo Tautalafua; Samoa	32.64m	Judy Tuara; Cook Islands	31.24m
Javelin throw	Perle Buard; French Polynesia	39.99m	Samantha Lockington; Cook Islands	34.57m	Judy Tuara; Cook Islands	33.96m

=== Mixed ===
Event	First		Second		Third	
800 metres Medley relay	Tonga	1:45.0	Cook Islands^{†} B	1:50.3	Samoa	1:55.2

^{†}: The B team was probably not eligible to win a medal.

== Medal table ==
The medal table was published.

* Host nation (Cook Islands)

Rank	Nation	Gold	Silver	Bronze	Total
1	Tonga (TON)	11	7	1	19
2	French Polynesia (TAH)	6	1	3	10
3	Samoa (SAM)	4	5	5	14
4	Cook Islands (COK)*	2	7	8	17
5	American Samoa (ASA)	0	0	1	1
Totals (5 entries)		23	20	18	61

^{†}: The medley relay B team from the Cook Islands was probably not eligible to win a medal.

== Participation ==
According to an unofficial count, 48 athletes from 5 countries participated.

- American Samoa (6)
- Cook Islands (18)
- French Polynesia (7)
- Samoa (8)
- Tonga (9)
