= Triathlon at the 2019 Pacific Games =

Triahlon competition

- Venue: Sogi Recreational Park
- Location: Apia, Samoa
- Dates: 19–20 July 2019

Triathlon at the 2019 Pacific Games was held on 19–20 July 2019 at the Sogi Recreational Park in Apia, Samoa.

== Medal summary ==
=== Medal table ===
Rank	Nation	Gold	Silver	Bronze	Total
1	Tahiti	5	2	0	7
2	New Caledonia	1	4	4	9
3	Fiji	0	0	1	1
3	Samoa*	0	0	1	1
Totals (4 entries)		6	6	6	18

=== Aquathon ===
Event	Gold		Silver		Bronze	
Men's sprint	Benjamin Zorgnotti; Tahiti	27:47	Benoit Riviere; New Caledonia	28:11	Julien Lopez; New Caledonia	28:18
Women's sprint	Salome De Barthez De Marmorieres; Tahiti	30:33	Benedicte Meunier; New Caledonia	31:13	Charlotte Robin; New Caledonia	32:09
Mixed team	Tahiti; Benjamin Zorgnotti; Cedric Wane; Salome De Barthez De Marmorieres	1:26:39	New Caledonia; Benoit Riviere; Julien Lopez; Benedicte Meunier	1:27:42	Fiji; Rhys Cheer; Petero Monoa; Sadie Pattie	1:48:18

=== Triathlon ===
Event	Gold		Silver		Bronze	
Men's sprint	Benjamin Zorgnotti; Tahiti	57:30	Raphael Armour-Lazzari; Tahiti	58:26	Patrick Vernay; New Caledonia	58:48
Women's sprint	Charlotte Robin; New Caledonia	1:05:07	Salome De Barthez De Marmorieres; Tahiti	1:06:48	Nathalie Viratelle; New Caledonia	1:08:05
Mixed team	Tahiti; Benjamin Zorgnotti; Raphael Armour-Lazzari; Salome De Barthez De Marmorieres	3:02:44	New Caledonia; Patrick Vernay; Mathieu Szalamacha; Charlotte Robin	3:05:54	Samoa; Darren Young; Molioo Teofilo; Sosefina Sooamalelagi	3:50:16

== See also ==
- Triathlon at the Pacific Games
