= Kaisa Pakileata =

Tongan athlete

Sport
- Country: Tonga
- Sport: Athletics
Medal record
Men's Athletics
Representing Tonga
Pacific Games
Bronze medal – third place	2019 Apia	Pole vault

Kaisa Pakileata is a Tongan Athlete who has represented Tonga at the Pacific Games.

At the 2019 Pacific Games in Apia he won bronze in the pole vault.
