= Laurence Faapoi Tasi =

Samoan athlete

Sport
- Country: Samoa
- Sport: Javelin throw
Medal record
Men's Javelin throw
Representing Samoa
Pacific Games
Silver medal – second place	2019 Apia	Javelin

Laurence Faapoi Tasi is a Samoan athlete who has represented Samoa at the Pacific Games.

Tasi is from Fogapoa on the island of Savaiʻi and was educated at Tuasivi College. At the 2019 Pacific Games in Apia he won Samoa's first medal, a silver in the javelin throw.
