= Tasi (neighborhood) =

Old neighbourhood in the city of Patras in Greece

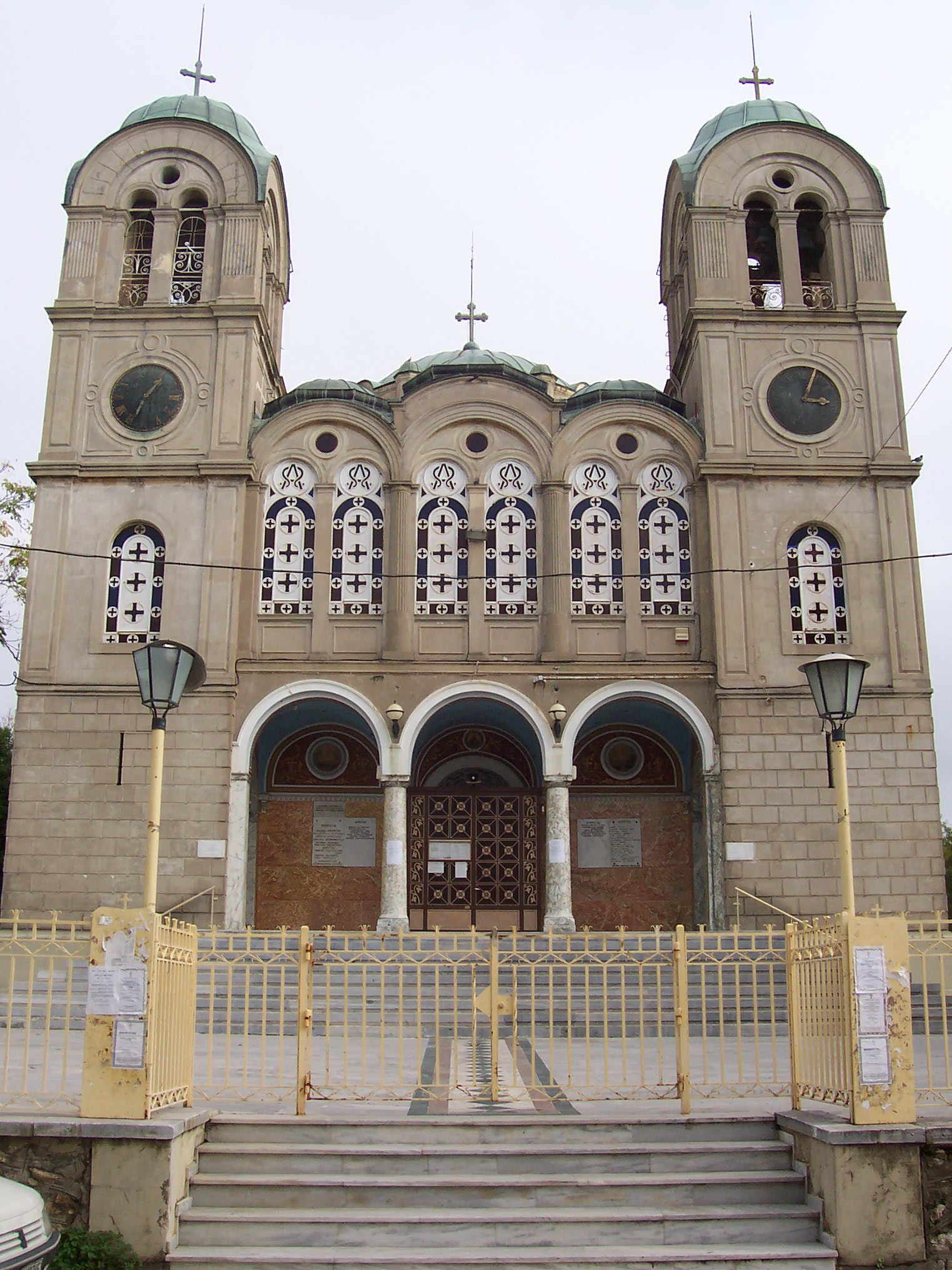
Pantokrator church, Patras, Greece (front).

Tasi (Greek: Τάσι) is an old neighbourhood in the city of Patras, Greece. It is located close to the castle in the modern upper city. During the Frankish rule, it contained a square named Tasso. During the Ottoman rule, the area around the square and the neighbourhood of Tasi (an alterration of Tasso) was destroyed. Then the square became the centre and the city market. There it had all of its trade shops of the city. Today, it conjectures that the neighbourhood and the square is located in the present neighbourhood of Pantokratora.

== Note ==
- The first version of the article is translated and is based from the article at the Greek Wikipedia (el:Main Page)
