= Avikash Lal =

Fijian long-distance runner

Personal information
- Nationality: Fijian
- Born: 18 June 1995 (age 31)

Sport
- Sport: Long-distance running
- Event(s): Half-Marathon, 5000 m, 10000 m
Medal record
Men's Athletics
Representing Fiji
Pacific Games
Gold medal – first place	2019 Apia	Half-Marathon
Silver medal – second place	2019 Apia	5000 m
Bronze medal – third place	2015 Port Moresby	Half-Marathon
- Updated on July 2019

Avikash Lal (born 18 June 1995 in Nadi) is a Fijian long-distance runner. He competed in the 2019 Pacific Games in Apia, winning the Gold in half-marathon, and the silver medal on 5000 m.

On the same distance, he also won the bronze medal at 2015 Pacific Games. He won the 10,000 m title at 2017 Oceania Athletics Championships in Suva.
