= Samuel Aragaw =

French Polynesian shot putter

Sport
- Country: French Polynesia
- Sport: Athletics
Medal record
Men's Athletics
Representing Tahiti
Pacific Games
Gold medal – first place	2019 Apia	5,000m
Silver medal – second place	2019 Apia	Half-marathon

Samuel Aragaw is a French Polynesian long-distance runner who has represented French Polynesia at the Pacific Games.

Aragaw is originally from Africa, and moved to French Polynesia in 2015.

In 2017 he won the Polynesian 10,000m championship. He won again in 2018.

At the 2019 Pacific Games in Apia he won gold in the 5,000m and silver in the half-marathon.
