= Kolinio Radrudru =

Fijian track and field athlete

Personal information
- Full name: Kolinio Baleiya Radrudru
- Born: 17 February 2001 (age 25) Nabouwalu, Fiji
- Height: 1.70 m (5 ft 7 in)
- Weight: 72 kg (159 lb)

Sport
- Country: Fiji
- Sport: Track and field
- Event: 100 metres
- Coached by: Jone Delai

Achievements and titles
- Personal best: 100 m - 10.92 seconds
Medal record
Men's Athletics
Representing Fiji
Pacific Mini Games
Bronze medal – third place	2017 Port Vila	100 m

Kolinio Radrudru (born 17 February 2001 in Nabouwalu) is a Fijian track and field sprinter who competed at the 2018 Commonwealth Games.

== Results ==
In 2018, Radrudru competed at the 2018 Commonwealth Games, Radrudru was drafted into heat 1 with six other athletes. He finished 6th with a time of 11.22 seconds beating only Kiribati's, Tirioro Willie. Radrudru was not able to qualify through to the next round as a top two finisher in his heat or fastest loser.

In 2017, Radrudru competed at the 2017 Commonwealth Youth Games for Fiji in the 100 m and the 200 m. In the 100 m, Radrudru raced in heat three and finished 5th place with a time of 11.20 sec. His time was not fast enough to advance through to the later stages. In the 200 m, Radrudru advanced through heat three as a fastest loser after finishing 4th with a time of 22.71 sec. In his semi-final, He finished 8th after recording 22.94 seconds but couldn't advance to the finals. Radrudru also competed at the Pacific Mini Games in 2017. He raced in the 100 m. He advanced through his heat after finishing 3rd with a time of 10.94 seconds. Radrudru ran his semi-final in a time of 10.92 seconds, finishing 4th, but advanced to the finals. In the finals, there was a 1.2 head wind but Radrudru was still able to run the race in 11.04 seconds and achieved the bronze medal position.
