= Grégory Bradai =

French Polynesian sprinter (born 1993)

Grégory Bradaï
Personal information
- Born: 20 June 1993 (age 33)

Sport
- Country: French Polynesia
- Sport: Track and field
- Event: sprinter
- Updated on 29 August 2015

Grégory Bradaï (born 20 June 1993) is a male French Polynesian sprinter. He competed in the 100 metres event at the 2015 World Championships in Athletics in Beijing, China.

Bradai won three international medals at the 2012 Oceania Junior Athletics Championships and 2012 Oceania Athletics Championships (both in the East division) as well as a bronze medal at the 2013 Oceania Athletics Championships. Bradai competes representing the Sa Toulouse UC club.

== See also ==
- French Polynesia at the 2015 World Championships in Athletics
