= Nathaniel Sulupo =

Samoan athlete

Personal information
- Born: 18 February 1998 (age 28) New Zealand

Sport
- Country: Samoa
- Sport: Shot put / Discus throw
Medal record
Men's Shot put / Discus throw
Representing Samoa
Pacific Games
Bronze medal – third place	2019 Apia	Discus
Bronze medal – third place	2019 Apia	Shot put

Nathaniel Sulupo (born 18 February 1998) is a Samoan New Zealander athlete who has represented Samoa at the Pacific Games.

Sulupo was born in New Zealand and grew up in Lower Hutt. He was educated at St Patrick's College, Silverstream and initially played rugby. He took up the discus at age 15 and subsequently trained at the Sola Power Throwing Academy in Lower Hutt under former Samoan shot-putter Shaka Sola.

He represented Samoa at the 2015 Commonwealth Youth Games in Apia, placing 7th with a throw of 51.67 metres.

At the 2019 Pacific Games in Apia he won bronze in both the shot put and discus.
