= Satuiatua =

Village in Samoa

Coordinates: 13°41′S 172°33′W

Satuiatua is a village on the island of Savai'i in Samoa. It is situated on the south coast of the island in the district of Palauli and the electoral district of Palauli 1. The population is 291.

The Satuiatua Beach Fales was one of the first locally owned tourism ventures on the island and attracted all types of visitors, especially surfers, for the reef break off the coast.
