= Patricia Taea =

Cook Island sprinter

Personal information
- Born: 25 May 1993 (age 33) Rarotonga, Cook Islands
- Height: 1.76 m (5 ft 9 in)
- Weight: 71 kg (157 lb)

Sport
- Country: Cook Islands
- Sport: Athletics
- Event: 100 metres
- Coached by: Tony Fairweather

Achievements and titles
- Personal best: 100m - 11.97 NR (2017)
Medal record
Women's athletics
Representing the Cook Islands
Pacific Mini Games
Gold medal – first place	2017 Port Vila	200 m
Silver medal – second place	2013 Mata-Utu	200 m
Silver medal – second place	2017 Port Vila	100 m
Oceania Championships
Silver medal – second place	2013 Papeete	100 m
Bronze medal – third place	2014 Rarotonga	100 m
Bronze medal – third place	2011 Apia	Javelin throw
- Updated on 19 May 2015

Patricia Nooroa Taea (born 25 May 1993) is a Cook Island female sprinter who competed in the 100 metres event at the 2012 Summer Olympics. She was ranked 14th in the Preliminaries for the women's 100 metres in a time of 12.47 seconds. She was chosen as torch lighter for the 2009 Pacific Mini Games (together with athlete Daniel Tutai) and flag bearer for the 2014 Commonwealth Games. She returned to the 2016 Olympics, advancing to the next round of heats.

== Personal bests ==
Event	Result	Venue	Date
Outdoor
100 m	11.97 s (wind: +1.5 m/s)	(Australia) Brisbane	3 Dec 2017
200 m	24.16 s (wind: +0.3 m/s)	(Vanuatu) Port Vila	14 Dec 2017
400 m	59.41 s	(Australia) Brisbane	5 Nov 2016
Long jump	5.07 m (wind: +1.6 m/s)	(Australia) Gold Coast, Queensland	2 Aug 2009
Javelin throw	38.07 m	(Australia) Sydney	12 Mar 2010
Indoor
60 m	7.93 s	(Poland) Sopot	8 Mar 2014

== Achievements ==
Year	Competition	Venue	Position	Event	Notes
Representing the Cook Islands
2007	Polynesian Championships	Rarotonga, Cook Islands	2nd	100m	13.2
2007	Polynesian Championships	Rarotonga, Cook Islands	2nd	200m	27.5
2007	Polynesian Championships	Rarotonga, Cook Islands	3rd	Long jump	4.79 m
2007	Polynesian Championships	Rarotonga, Cook Islands	4th	Javelin	30.02 m
2008	Oceania Youth Championships	Saipan, Northern Mariana Islands	4th	100m	13.34 (wind: -0.7 m/s)
2008	Oceania Youth Championships	Saipan, Northern Mariana Islands	2nd	Long jump	5.02 m (wind: +0.3 m/s)
2008	Oceania Youth Championships	Saipan, Northern Mariana Islands	3rd	Javelin throw	31.91 m
2009	Polynesian Championships	Gold Coast, Queensland, Australia	3rd	100m	13.31 (wind: -1.0 m/s)
2009	Polynesian Championships	Gold Coast, Queensland, Australia	4th	200m	27.11 w (wind: +3.5 m/s)
2009	Polynesian Championships	Gold Coast, Queensland, Australia	3rd	Long jump	5.09m w (wind: +5.1 m/s)
2009	Polynesian Championships	Gold Coast, Queensland, Australia	4th	Javelin	32.26m
2009	Pacific Mini Games	Rarotonga, Cook Islands	5th	100m	13.09 (wind: +0.1 m/s)
2009	Pacific Mini Games	Rarotonga, Cook Islands	7th (h)	200m	27.34 (NWI)
2009	Pacific Mini Games	Rarotonga, Cook Islands	5th	Long jump	5.03m (wind: 0.0 m/s)
2010	Oceania Youth Championships	Sydney, Australia	25th (h)	100m	13.31 (wind: +0.5 m/s)
2010	Oceania Youth Championships	Sydney, Australia	3rd	Javelin throw	38.07 m
2010	Oceania Junior Championships	Cairns, Australia	3rd	100 m	12.73 s w (wind: +2.3 m/s)
2010	Oceania Junior Championships	Cairns, Australia	1st	Javelin throw	37.17 m
2010	World Junior Championships	Moncton, New Brunswick, Canada	38th (h)	100m	13.05 (wind: +0.2 m/s)
2010	Commonwealth Games	Delhi, India	39th (h)	100m	13.10
2011	Oceania Championships (Regional Division East)	Apia, Samoa	4th	Shot put	12.79m
2011	Oceania Championships (Regional Division East)	Apia, Samoa	3rd	Javelin throw	27.67 m
2011	World Championships	Daegu, South Korea	54th (h)	100m	12.63 (wind: +1.0 m/s)
2011	Pacific Games	Nouméa, New Caledonia	7th	100m	12.60 (wind: +0.3 m/s)
2012	World Indoor Championships	Istanbul, Turkey	48th (h)	60 m	8.06
2012	Oceania Junior Championships (Regional Division East)	Cairns, Australia	2nd	100 m	12.78 s (wind: -0.1 m/s)
2012	Oceania Junior Championships (Regional Division East)	Cairns, Australia	2nd	Javelin throw	37.40 m
2012	Oceania Championships (Regional Division East)	Cairns, Queensland, Australia	4th	100m	12.64 (wind: +0.4 m/s)
2012	Olympic Games	London, United Kingdom	60th (pr)	100 m	12.47 (wind: +0.2 m/s)
2013	Oceania Championships	Papeete, French Polynesia	2nd	100m	12.57 (wind: -0.7 m/s)
2013	World Championships	Moscow, Russia	39th (h)	100m	12.39 (wind: -0.6 m/s)
2013	Pacific Mini Games	Mata-Utu, Wallis and Futuna	5th	100m	12.29 (wind: +1.5 m/s)
2013	Pacific Mini Games	Mata-Utu, Wallis and Futuna	2nd	200m	25.13 (wind: +1.1 m/s)
2014	World Indoor Championships	Sopot, Poland	39th (h)	60 m	7.93
2014	Oceania Championships	Rarotonga, Cook Islands	3rd	100m	12.34 (wind: +0.5 m/s)
2014	Oceania Championships	Rarotonga, Cook Islands	5th	200m	26.11 w (wind: +2.2 m/s)
2014	Oceania Championships	Rarotonga, Cook Islands	7th	Mixed sprint medley	1:50.10
2014	Commonwealth Games	Glasgow, United Kingdom	42nd (h)	100m	12.68 (wind: -0.3 m/s)
2014	Commonwealth Games	Glasgow, United Kingdom	38th (h)	200m	26.14 (wind: -0.5 m/s)
2015	Oceania Championships	Cairns, Queensland, Australia	7th	100m	12.29 w (wind: +2.9 m/s)
2015	Oceania Championships	Cairns, Queensland, Australia	9th (h)	200m	25.29 (wind: +1.2 m/s)
2015	World Championships	Beijing, China	48th (h)	100 m	12.34
2016	Olympic Games	Rio de Janeiro, Brazil	61st (h)	100 m	12.41
2017	World Championships	London, United Kingdom	40th (h)	100 m	12.18 NR
2018	World Indoor Championships	Birmingham, United Kingdom	45th (h)	60 m	7.90
2018	Commonwealth Games	Gold Coast, Australia	35th (h)	100 m	12.22
2018	Commonwealth Games	Gold Coast, Australia	30th (h)	200 m	24.91
