= Kelvin Masoe =

Samoan track and field athlete

Personal information
- Nationality: Samoan
- Born: 4 March 1999 (age 27) Satuiatua, Samoa
- Education: Vaiola College
- Height: 1.85 m (6 ft 1 in)
- Weight: 84 kg (185 lb)

Sport
- Country: Samoa
- Sport: Track and field
- Event(s): 100 metres, 200 metres

Achievements and titles
- Personal best: 100 metres - 10.56 seconds (2019) 200 metres - 21.98 seconds Long jump - 7.65 m (NR)
Medal record
Men's Athletics
Representing Samoa
Pacific Games
Gold medal – first place	2019 Apia	Long Jump
Silver medal – second place	2019 Apia	4 x 100 m Relay
Bronze medal – third place	2019 Apia	100 m
Pacific Mini Games
Silver medal – second place	2017 Port Vila	100m

Kelvin Tuʻiala Masoe (born 4 March 1999 in Satuiatua) is a Samoan track and field sprinter who competed at the 2018 Commonwealth Games. He attended school at Vaiola College on the island of Savaii in Samoa.

== Athletics career ==
Masoe competed for Samoa at the 2018 Commonwealth Games in the men's 100 m and the men's 200 m sprint events. In the men's 100 m, Masoe was drafted into heat 2 of the competition, he ran the race in a new personal best of 10.72 seconds and finished fifth place out of seven athletes, this time was unable to advance Masoe through to the later rounds. In the men's 200 m, Masoe was drafted into heat 7 and finished seventh out of the eight athletes that raced, beating only Pako Seribe who did not finish the race. Masoe ran the race in another personal best of 21.98 seconds but was not fast enough to advance through to the later rounds of competition.

In 2019, Masoe competed in the Pacific Games in Apia. Masoe won the gold medal on long jump, with a national record of 7.65 meters. Masoe proceeded to also earn the bronze medal in the 100 m with a personal best of 10.56 seconds. Masoe then added a third medal to his haul with a silver in the 4 × 100 m relay, in which team Samoa achieved a time of 40.26 seconds.

== Rugby Sevens career ==
In 2019, Masoe was called up onto the Samoa rugby sevens squad along with Paulo Fanuasa following the absence of the injured Uaina Sione, and Laaloi Leilua. Masoe was scheduled to compete at the 2019 South Africa Sevens tournament in Cape Town. Masoa and Samoa contested Pool D, with Ireland, Kenya, and Australia. They weren't able to win any of their games, finishing with an 0 and 3 record, which lead them to play for thirteenth place against Spain. Masoe was substituted on in the tenth minute, and scored the final try of the match in the fourteenth, putting Samoa up 38-7 and winning the match.
