= Joshua Ilustre =

Guamanian middle-distance runner (born 1994)

Personal information
- Born: January 23, 1994 (age 32) Tamuning, Guam
- Height: 5 ft 10 in (178 cm)
- Weight: 160 lb (73 kg)

Sport
- Country: Guam
- Sport: Athletics

Joshua Ilustre (born January 23, 1994) is a Guamanian middle-distance runner. He competed in the men's 800 metres at the 2016 Summer Olympics but was disqualified for a lane infringement in his heat.

== Early life and education ==
Joshua Ilustre was born in Tamuning, Guam on January 23, 1994. Ilustre graduated from George Washington High School. In high school he participated in the Oceania Championships, the Micronesia Area Championships, Hong Kong Intercity Athletics Championships and the Mountain Pacific Sports Federation Indoor Track and Field Championships.

He was accepted for academic merit to University of Portland, and made the track team while a sophomore as a walk-on. He graduated with a bachelor's degree in biology.

== Career ==
=== 2016 Summer Olympics ===
Ilustre was notified he would be participating in the Olympics in July 2016 by Guam Track & Field Association President Marissa Peroy. Guam had received two universality slots—one male and one female—for athletics.

Ilustre ran in the fourth heat of the 800 metres in Rio. An hour after the race he learned that he had been disqualified for a lane violation. His coach Derek Mandell submitted an appeal, but after a 12 hour wait learned it was unsuccessful. Mandell believed that video evidence showed the infraction was unclear, but a panel of judges upheld the decision. He finished with a time of 1:58, and his personal best was 2:01, however due to the disqualification his personal record stayed at 2:01. Since Ilustre finished last in his heat, there would have been no change in circumstances had he not been disqualified, and he wanted his personal record to count.

=== Post-Olympics ===
Following the Olympics, he took a month long mental and physical respite. Ilustre returned to Portland to work as a medical transcriptionist, which he did for seven months before becoming homesick and returning to Guam. He has been helping his father's coconut business and works part-time at Run Guam, a store selling sportswear in Hagåtña.
