= Təsi =

- Municipality
- Location within Azerbaijan
- Coordinates: 40°29′39″N 48°45′55″E
- Country: Azerbaijan
- Rayon: Gobustan

Population
  - Total: 340
- Time zone: UTC+4 (AZT)
  - Summer (DST): UTC+5 (AZT)

Təsi (also, Tasy and Tesi) is a village and municipality in the Gobustan Rayon of Azerbaijan with a population of 340.
