= Shupeng Ah Vui =

Samoan athlete (born 1997)

Personal information
- Born: 4 December 1997 (age 28)

Sport
- Country: Samoa
- Sport: Athletics
Medal record
Men's Athletics
Representing Samoa
Pacific Games
Silver medal – second place	2019 Apia	4x100m relay

Shupeng Ah Vui (born 4 December 1997) is a Samoan athlete. He has represented Samoa at the Pacific Games and Commonwealth Games.

Ah Vui is from Siusega. He competed in the 100 meters at the 2018 Commonwealth Games on the Gold Coast in Australia, and set a personal best, but came last in his heat. At the 2019 Pacific Games in Apia he won silver in the 4 × 100 metres relay.
