= Sililo Kivalu =

Wallisian athlete (born 1999)

Personal information
- Born: 8 July 1999

Sport
- Country: Wallis and Futuna
- Sport: Decathlon
Medal record
Men's Decathlon
Representing Wallis and Futuna
Melanesian Athletics Championships
Gold medal – first place	2018 Port Vila	Pole vault
Bronze medal – third place	2018 Port Vila	Long jump
Pacific Mini Games
Bronze medal – third place	2017 Port Vila	Decathlon

Sililo Kivalu (born 8 July 1999) is a Wallisian athlete who has represented Wallis and Futuna at the Pacific Mini Games.

Kivalu participated in athletics at the 2017 Pacific Mini Games, where he won bronze in the decathlon.

He took part in the 2018 Melanesian Athletics Championships, where he won the pole vault, as the only participant, and was awarded bronze in the long jump.

At the 2019 Oceania Athletics Championships, he came seventh in the decathlon, and at the 2019 Pacific Games, he came fifth in the decathlon with 5,249 points.
