= Technical Advisory Service for Images =

Former educational technology advice service in the UK

The Technical Advisory Service for Images (TASI) provided advice to the United Kingdom's Further Education (FE) and Higher Education (HE) communities in the creation and use of digital images. Its services included a Web site , helpdesk, training programme, and mailing list. TASI was funded by the Joint Information Systems Committee (Jisc) and based within the Institute for Learning and Research Technology (ILRT) of the University of Bristol. It later became known as JISC Digital Media but the service was retired on 31 July 2016.
