= Miriama Senokonoko =

Fijian sprinter

Personal information
- Nationality: Fijian
- Born: 21 January 1995 (age 30)

Sport
- Sport: Athletics
- Event: Sprinting

Miriama Senokonoko (born 21 January 1995) is a Fijian athlete. She competed in the women's 400 metres at the 2018 IAAF World Indoor Championships.
