= Elizabeth Sumner =

Hawaiian high chiefess (1851–1911)

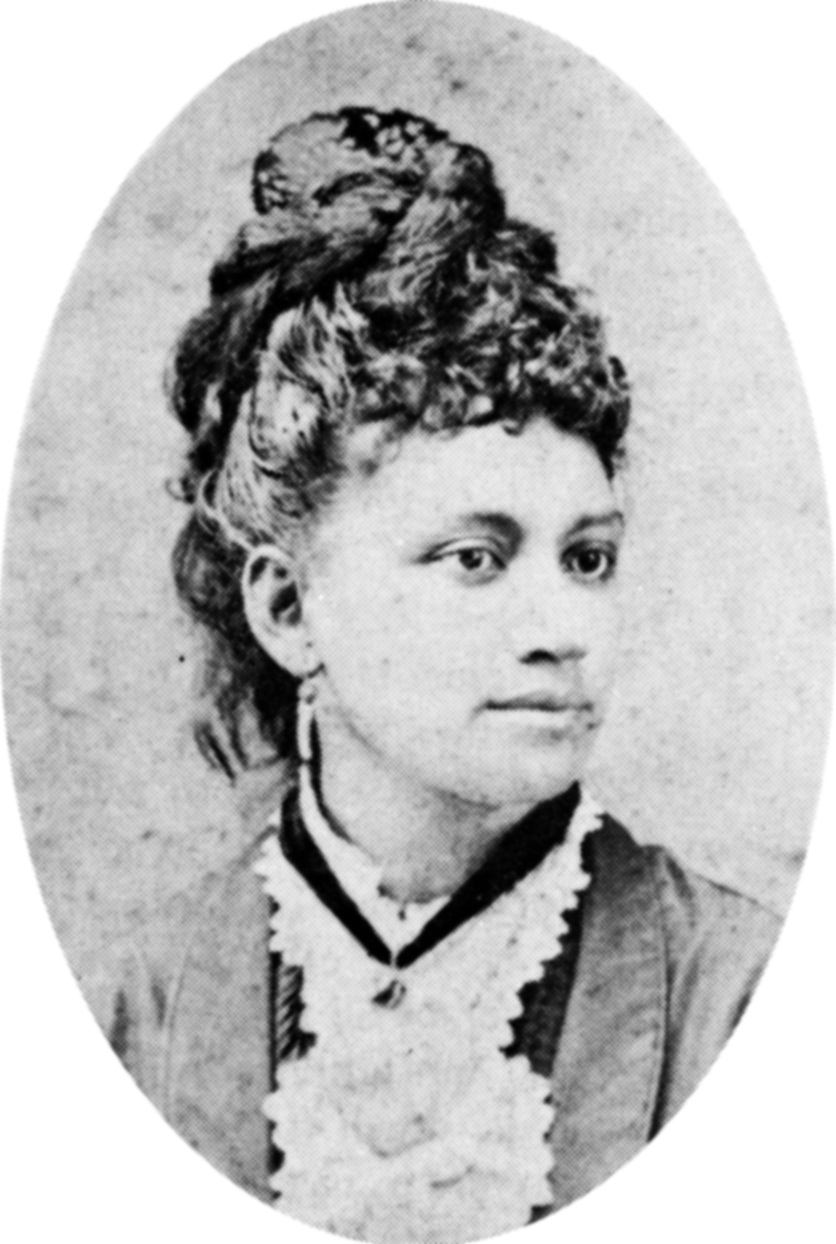
- Born: December 24, 1851; Honolulu, Oahu, Hawaiian Kingdom
- Died: February 22, 1911 (aged 59); Honolulu, Oahu, Territory of Hawaii
- Burial: Honolulu Catholic Cemetery
- Spouse: Achuck; Keawepoʻoole
- Issue: Anastasia Nalanialua Achuck; Mary Achuck; Mauli Keawepoʻoole
Names
- Elizabeth Sumner Chapman Achuck Lapana Keawepoʻoole
- Father: William Keolaloa Kahānui Sumner
- Mother: Mauli Tehuiari‘i

Elizabeth Sumner Chapman Achuck Lapana Keawepoʻoole (December 24, 1851 – February 22, 1911) was a Hawaiian high chiefess during the Hawaiian Kingdom and lady-in-waiting of Princess Likelike. An accomplished Hawaiian composer, she composed the popular Hawaiian love song Sanoe with Queen Liliʻuokalani, which was about a love affair in the Hawaiian royal court in the 1870s.

== Early life and family ==
Born on December 24, 1851, in the city of Honolulu, on the island of Oahu, she was the daughter of William Keolaloa Kahānui Sumner, an ali‘i of partial Hawaiian descent, and his punalua (two or more spouses) partner Haa Maore a.k.a. Mauli Tehuiari‘i, a Tahitian princess and the sister of Sumner's lawful wife Manaiula Tehuiari‘i. She was of Hawaiian, Tahitian and English descent.

Her father High Chief William K. K. Sumner (1816–1885) was the eldest son of High Chiefess Keakua‘aihue Kanealai Hua and the British Captain William Sumner (1786–1847), of Northampton. Captain Sumner arrived in Hawaii in 1807 as a cabin boy; initially befriending Kauai's king Kaumualiʻi, he later became a naval captain under King Kamehameha I, who united the Hawaiian Islands in 1810. Sumner captained the government schooner Waverly and deported the party of Catholic missionaries led by Alexis Bachelot and Patrick Short in 1831. Hua, her paternal grandmother, was the cousin and hānai (adoptive) sister of High Chiefess Ahia Beckley, wife of Captain George Charles Beckley, who was one of the reputed designers of the Flag of Hawaii. Related to the Kamehamehas through Uminuikuka‘ailani, her grandmother descended from the famous twins Kahānui and Kaha‘opulani, the Kohala chiefs who reared Kamehameha during his infancy. Elizabeth attended Oahu College from 1864 to 1865.

Elizabethʻs elder paternal half-sister was Nancy Wahinekapu Sumner (1839–1895); their mothers were sisters. Their family's ancestry and connection to the ruling families of Hawaii and Tahiti allowed the two sisters to associate with many members of the royal family of Hawaii. Nancy was a prominent lady of the court during the reigns of King Kamehameha IV and King Kamehameha V, serving as a lady-in-waiting to Queen Emma and close friend to Princess Victoria Kamāmalu. Elizabeth's elder maternal half-sister Sarah Chapman Weed, the daughter of Princess Mauli and William Chapman, was an associate of Queen Emma. Sarah had an antagonistic relation with Nancy and a verbal conflict between them started a rift in the two sides of the family. This family dispute resulted in Mauli's and Sarah's' eviction from their home on Sumner Island (a islet in Pearl Harbor) by Nancy's mother Manaiula. Subsequently, Elizabeth decided to renounce her Sumner surname in favor of Chapman.

== Compositions ==
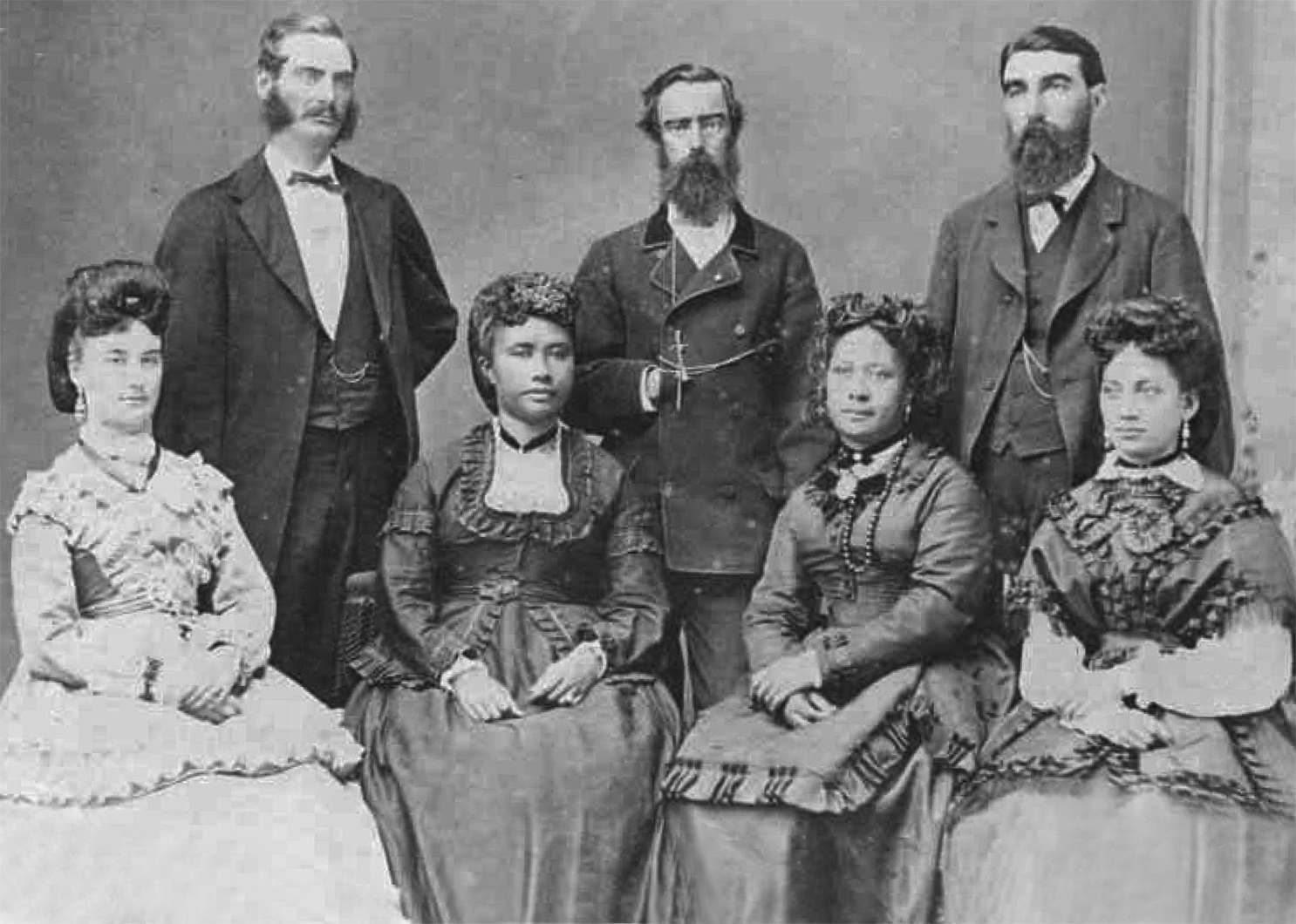
Elizabeth Keawepoʻoole Sumner (seated, far right) with Liliʻuokalani and Likelike, 1880

Elizabeth became the lady-in-waiting of Princess Likelike, befriending her and her elder sister Princess Liliʻuokalani. Both princesses were the royal sisters of the reigning King Kalākaua who had won the royal election of 1874 against Queen Emma. Liliʻuokalani, who would later reign as the last queen of Hawaii, called Elizabeth by the name of Lizzie. Also known as Kapeka, she collaborated with Liliʻuokalani and wrote several songs under this name. Their best known composition was Sanoe, which along with Aloha ʻOe were amongst Liliʻuokalani most classic works. This romantic mele (song) described a secret love affair in the court of King Kalākaua in the 1870s involving an unknown man and a married lady at the royal court given the pseudonym "Sanoe," meaning "the fog or mist of the mountaintop,". The identity of the lady has been popularly ascribed to Kapeka herself or Likelike, although the lyrics do not disclose the woman's identity. Other songs credited to Elizabeth include Penei No, Pua Ani Ani, and Ka Lei Na Ke Aloha with most of her work still in private hands. Beside being an accomplished composer, she was expert in the traditional chants of Ancient Hawaii. She composed a kanikau (death chant) for her half-sister after Nancy's death from asthma on January 10, 1895.

== Marriages and later life ==
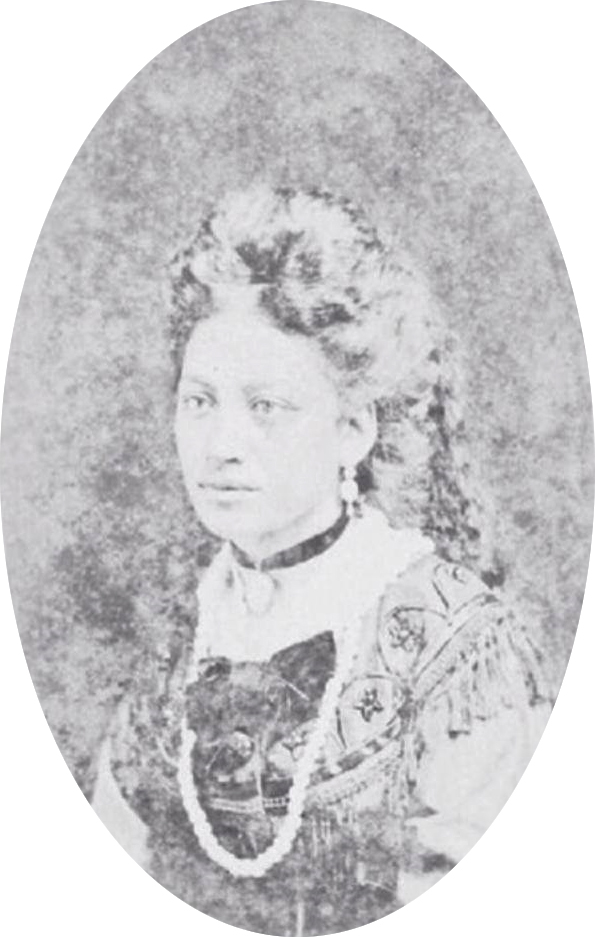
Elizabeth Sumner

=== Marriage to Achuck ===
Elizabeth married a wealthy Chinese businessman Mr. Achuck (1832–1877). Achuck was the adopted, Hawaiianized name of Qʻing Ming Qwai, who had immigrated in 1849 from Zhongshan in the Guangdong province of China. He was the friend and business partner of Chun Afong, Hawaii's first Chinese millionaire, with whom he co-owned Afong & Achuck, a chain of stores formed in 1865, which sold Oriental novelties to Chinese residents and the upper echelon of Honolulu society. Although not the first, (Note: Achuck's business partner Afong was already married to Elizabeth's estranged cousin Julia Fayerweather.) the interracial marriage of a Hawaiian high chiefess to a Chinese businessman was considered unconventional at best. Her father disproved of the union but "found solace in the fact that the 'Chinaman' was a wealthy one." Considered a beauty of the royal court, Elizabeth had numerous prominent suitors and marriage proposals. Queen Emma, a political rival to the Kalākaua family and a friend of her sister Nancy, referred to Elizabethʻs husband as the "pigtail suitor Achuck." Commenting on Achuck's previous two marriages, one which was still legal, she stated in a letter, "Fancy spending a lifetime with a heathen Chinese who has the diversion of two wives at home to whom he must now and again go to spend a time with." Achuck's first wife was still alive in China while he had also previously contracted a marriage with a Hawaiian girl named Kamaua. Kamaua was twelve years old at the time of her marriage to Achuck and was a student of Protestant missionary Reverend Lowell Smith of the Kaumakapili Church, who orchestrated the match. Achuck later dissolved the union with Kamaua on the charges of adultery.

In a ceremony presided by the Reverend Father Herman Koeckemann, Achuck and Elizabeth were married on the evening of July 3, 1872, at the residence of Princess Likelike and her husband Archibald Scott Cleghorn in Honolulu. Princess Liliʻuokalani and her husband John Dominis were their witnesses. Because of the family dispute, Elizabeth married under the surname of Chapman, (Note: John Renken Kahaʻi Topolinski explained this was the result of a family disagreement between Elizabeth, her half-sister Nancy and their mothers.) using the name of her mother's second husband instead of her Sumner surname. With Achuck, she had two known daughters. The eldest named Anastasia Nalanialua Achuck (1874–1947), married James Kenneth Olds Jr. in 1895, and the younger daughter was named Mary Achuck, who married H. G. Morse and later William Kaea Sproule.

=== Marriage to Lapana ===
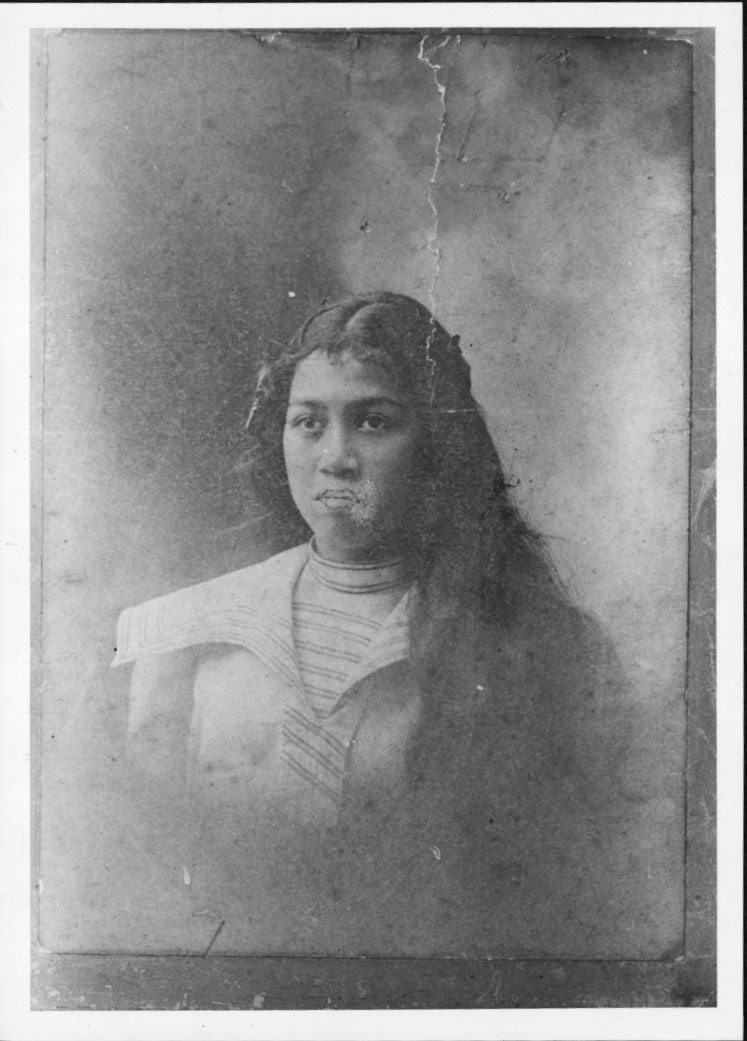
Daughter Mauli Keawepoʻoole (1885–1899)

After Achuck's death, Elizabeth remarried to a Hawaiian man named Lapana Keawepoʻoole, a painter who later became a police officer and turnkey at Oʻahu prison. Keawepoʻoʻole literally means "headless Keawe." The name has also been often spelled Keawepoʻole or Keawepoʻoolenamoku.

Lapana and Elizabeth had one daughter Mauli Keawepoʻoole, who had been a student at the Kamehameha Girls' School before dying on May 28, 1899, from cephalitis.

After suffering from diabetic complications for four months, Elizabeth died in Honolulu at her daughter's residence on Liliha street on February 22, 1911. She was sixty years old at the time of her death. Her funeral service was held at the Cathedral Basilica of Our Lady of Peace and was attended by ladies of the Kaʻahumanu Society. She was buried in an unmarked grave at Honolulu Catholic Cemetery, also known as the King Street Catholic Cemetery where other members of the Sumner family including her father are also buried.

== Bibliography ==
- Carroll, Rick (2006). Iz: Voice of the People. Honolulu: Bess Press. ISBN 978-1-57306-257-2.
- Daws, Gavan (1968). Shoal of Time: A History of the Hawaiian Islands. Honolulu: University Press of Hawaii. ISBN 978-0-8248-0324-7.
- Dye, Robert Paul (2010). "Merchant Prince: Chun Afong in Hawaiʻi, 1849–90" (PDF). Chinese America: History & Perspectives. 15. San Francisco: Chinese Historical Society of America with UCLA Asian American Studies Center: 23–36.
- Dye, Bob (1997). Merchant Prince of the Sandalwood Mountains: Afong and the Chinese in Hawaiʻi. Honolulu: University of Hawaii Press. ISBN 978-0-8248-1772-5.
- Hawaii Medical Association (2004). Hawaii Medical Journal. Honolulu: Hawaii Medical Association.
- Kaeo, Peter; Queen Emma (1976). Korn, Alfons L. (ed.). News from Molokai, Letters Between Peter Kaeo & Queen Emma, 1873–1876. Honolulu: The University Press of Hawaii. ISBN 978-0-8248-0399-5.
- Punahou School (1907). Alexander, William DeWitt (ed.). Oahu College: List of Trustees, Presidents, Instructors, Matrons, Librarians, Superintendents of Grounds and Students, 1841–1906. Historical Sketch of Oahu College. Honolulu: Hawaiian Gazette Company.
- Thrum, Thomas George, ed. (1896). Hawaiian Personal Names: A Preliminary Study into a Somewhat Neglected Subject. Honolulu: Honolulu Star-Bulletin.
- Topolinski, John Renken Kahaʻi (January 1976). "Musical Diggings – Na Mele Ohana (Family Songs)". Haʻilono Mele. II (1). Honolulu: The Hawaiian Music Foundation: 3–8.
- Topolinski, John Renken Kahaʻi (February 1976). "Musical Diggings – The Sumner Family, A Legacy of Family Mele and Chants". Haʻilono Mele. II (2). Honolulu: The Hawaiian Music Foundation: 2–6.
- Topolinski, John Renken Kahaʻi (March 1976). "Musical Diggings – The Sumner Family". Haʻilono Mele. II (3). Honolulu: The Hawaiian Music Foundation: 3–8.
- Topolinski, John Renken Kahaʻi (1975). Nancy Sumner: A Part-Hawaiian High Chiefess, 1839–1895. Honolulu: University of Hawaiʻi at Mānoa. OCLC 16326376.
- Topolinski, John Renken Kahaʻi (1981). "Nancy Sumner, Hawaiian Courtlady". Hawaiian Journal of History. 15. Honolulu: Hawaiian Historical Society: 50–58. hdl:10524/285.
