= William Keolaloa Sumner =

Hawaiian high chief

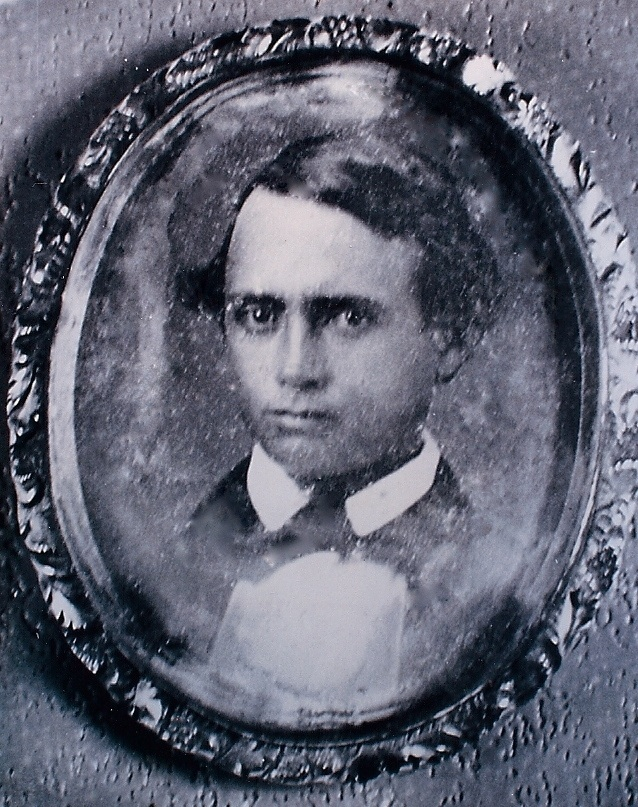
William Keolaloa Kahānui Sumner as a young man

William Keolaloa Kahānui Sumner, Jr. (c. 1816 – May 25, 1885) was a high chief of the Kingdom of Hawaii through his mother's family; his father was an English captain from Northampton. Sumner married a Tahitian princess. Aided by royal family connections, he became a major landowner and politician in Hawaii.

After contracting leprosy in 1877, by law Sumner was exiled to Kalaupapa, Molokaʻi. He served there as luna (superintendent) of the leper colony from 1878 to 1884. He died of leprosy in a Honolulu hospital in 1884.

== Early life and family ==
William Keolaloa Kahānui Sumner, Jr. was born circa 1816, the eldest son of Captain William Sumner (1786–1847) and High Chiefess Keakua'aihue Kanealai Hua. Captain Sumner, from Northampton, was an early settler of Hawaii who arrived in 1807 as a cabin boy. Befriended by Kauai's king Kaumualii, Sumner later became a naval captain under King Kamehameha I, who united the Hawaiian Islands in 1810. Related to the Kamehamehas through Uminuikukaailani, his mother family descended from the famous twins Kahānui and Kaha‘opulani, the Kohala chiefs who reared Kamehameha during his infancy. His mother was also a cousin and hānai (adoptive) sister of High Chiefess Ahia Beckley, wife of Captain George Charles Beckley, who was one of the reputed designers of the Flag of Hawaii. William had younger siblings: John Kapilikea Sumner (1820–1915) and Maria Sumner (1824–1908). Maria married Henry Sea and later Robert Grimes Davis.

Both Sumner brothers married Tahitian princesses. William married Manaiula Tehuiarii. John married her cousin Princess Ninito, who had been formally betrothed to Prince Moses Kekūāiwa. With Manaiula Tehuiarii, he had his eldest daughter Nancy Wahinekapu Sumner (1839–1895). After Manailua's death, William married Mauli Tehuiarii; their daughter was Elizabeth Keawepoʻoʻole Sumner (1850–1911). Both Nancy and Elizabeth Sumner served as ladies-in-waiting at the Hawaiian royal court. Through both daughters, Sumner has living descendants.

== Career ==
Sumner and his brother John bought the land of Mōkapu from High Chief Abner Pākī in 1856. This land passed to his brother after William's death, and then to their sister Maria and her children from her second marriage with Robert Grimes Davis. The former Sumner landholdings in Mōkapu, along with other parcels held by other Hawaiian landholders in the region, were later acquired by the United States government and developed as the Marine Corps Base Hawaii.

Sumner was elected to the House of Representative for Oahu with a seat for the regular session of the Legislature of 1855 but, according to American Commissioner to Hawaii David Lawrence Gregg, he did not appear to serve for an unknown reason. The legislative roster for 1855 listed his name as "William Sumner Keolaloa." The records of the House of Representatives however indicate that a "W. S. Keolaloa" participated in the legislative sessions. Either way, Sumner was defeated for reelection in the summer of 1855. On January 16, 1864, he was commissioned first lieutenant of the 1st Company of the Yeomanry, a volunteer army regiment in the military of Hawaii.

== Superintendent of Kalaupapa ==
After Sumner contracted leprosy (also known as Hansen's disease), he was admitted to the leper colony of Kalaupapa on March 24, 1877. The legislature of the kingdom in 1865 had enacted a law for the prevention of leprosy, which required those with severe cases to be quarantined at the colony on Molokaʻi. Later that same year, the first luna (superintendent) William P. Ragsdale died; he was a highly popular part-Hawaiian attorney who had also served the government as an interpreter. After Ragsdale died, the Board of Health temporarily appointed the Catholic priest Father Damien as his replacement, but Damien proved unpopular with the native Hawaiian residents. He demonstrated religious discrimination, harshly treating a Hawaiian Protestant minister J. K. Kahuila, whom he judged as too independent. The native population petitioned for Damien's removal, and for Sumner, who was much more well-liked and amicable, to take over. Father Damien resigned shortly afterward and Sumner was appointed the luna by the government in Honolulu.

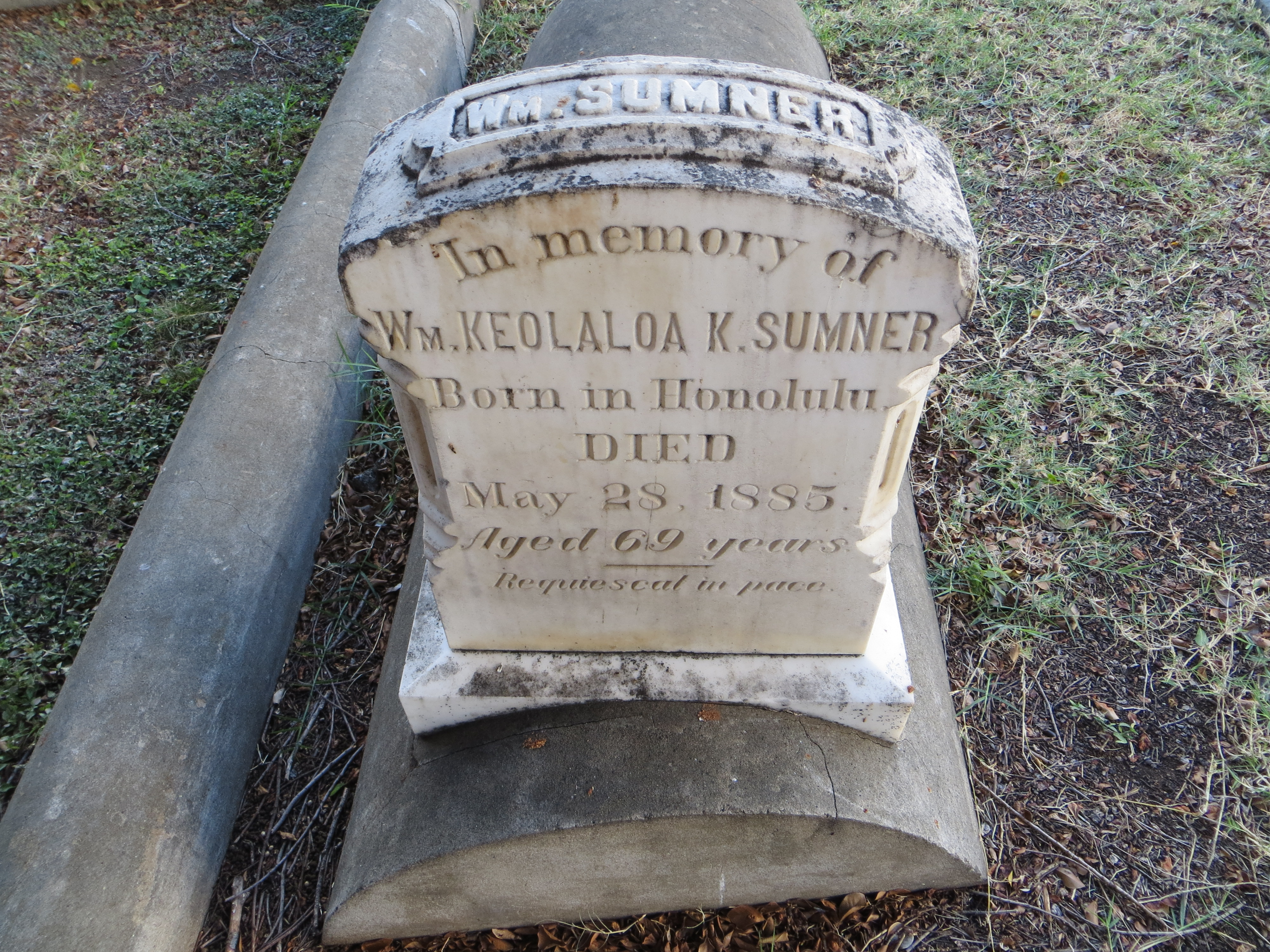
Tombstone of William Keolaloa Kahānui Sumner, Jr. at the Honolulu Catholic Cemetery

From 1878 to 1884, Sumner served as luna of the Kalaupapa, representing the Board of Health. He was tasked with "keeping order" in the settlement, with the American Clayton Strawn serving as his assistant. Sumner was bilingual in Hawaiian and English, and was also well liked and respected by the residents. However, he was considered too old and ill to maintain the position of leadership for long. In 1879, Nathaniel Bright Emerson became the resident physician and took over many of Sumner's responsibilities. Sumner was allowed to retain the title of luna to avoid opposition from a majority of the residents if he was removed.

In 1884, Sumner was sent for treatment to Kakaʻako Branch Hospital in Honolulu. He was replaced by Ambrose Kanoeali‘i Hutchison, another part-Hawaiian man, as resident superintendent. Sumner died in Honolulu on May 25, 1885. He was buried at the King Street Catholic Cemetery, also known as the Honolulu Catholic Cemetery, beside other members of the Sumner family.

== Bibliography ==
- Daws, Gavan (1984). Holy Man: Father Damien of Molokai. Honolulu: University of Hawaii Press. ISBN 978-0-8248-0920-1.
- Dye, Bob (1997). Merchant Prince of the Sandalwood Mountains: Afong and the Chinese in Hawaiʻi. Honolulu: University of Hawaii Press. ISBN 978-0-8248-1772-5.
- Gregg, David Lawrence (1982). King, Pauline (ed.). The Diaries of David Lawrence Gregg: An American Diplomat in Hawaii, 1853–1858. Honolulu: Hawaiian Historical Society. ISBN 9780824808617.
- Lydecker, Robert Colfax, ed. (1918). Roster Legislatures of Hawaii, 1841–1918. Honolulu: Hawaiian Gazette Company.
- Kaeo, Peter; Queen Emma (1976). Korn, Alfons L. (ed.). News from Molokai, Letters Between Peter Kaeo & Queen Emma, 1873–1876. Honolulu: The University Press of Hawaii. ISBN 978-0-8248-0399-5.
- Moblo, Pennie (1996). Defamation by Disease: Leprosy, Myth, and Ideology in Nineteenth Century Hawaiʻi. Honolulu: University of Hawaii.
- Moblo, Pennie (June 1999). Ethnic Intercession: Leadership at the Kalaupapa Leprosy Colony. Laie, HI: Brigham Young University. pp. 27–69.
- Taylor, A. P. (1929). Ford, Alexander Hume (ed.). "Niniko, 'Garden of Rest'". The Mid-Pacific Magazine. 37 (5). T. H., A. H. Ford; Pan-Pacific Union, Pan-Pacific Research Institution: 433–440.
- Tayman, John (2010). The Colony: The Harrowing True Story of the Exiles of Molokai. New York: Simon and Schuster. ISBN 978-1-4165-5192-8.
- Tomonari-Tuggle, Myra J.; Arakaki, Tom (2014). Mōkapu: A Paradise on the Peninsula : Stories from Not So Long Ago (PDF). Honolulu: International Archaeological Research Institute, Incorporated.
- Topolinski, John Renken Kahaʻi (January 1976). "Musical Diggings – Na Mele Ohana (Family Songs)". Haʻilono Mele. II (1). Honolulu: The Hawaiian Music Foundation: 3–8.
- Topolinski, John Renken Kahaʻi (February 1976). "Musical Diggings – The Sumner Family, A Legacy of Family Mele and Chants". Haʻilono Mele. II (2). Honolulu: The Hawaiian Music Foundation: 2–6.
- Topolinski, John Renken Kahaʻi (March 1976). "Musical Diggings – The Sumner Family". Haʻilono Mele. II (3). Honolulu: The Hawaiian Music Foundation: 3–8.
- Topolinski, John Renken Kahaʻi (1981). "Nancy Sumner, Hawaiian Courtlady". Hawaiian Journal of History. 15. Honolulu: Hawaiian Historical Society: 50–58. hdl:10524/285.
