= William Sumner =

William Sumner may refer to:

- William Graham Sumner (1840–1910), American professor of sociology
- William H. Sumner (1780–1861), American politician in Massachusetts
- William Keolaloa Sumner (1816–1885), Hawaiian chief
