= 2023 in French Polynesia =

- Decades: 2000s; 2010s; 2020s
- See also: Other events of 2023; Timeline of French Polynesian history

Events from 2023 in French Polynesia.

== Incumbents ==
- President: Édouard Fritch (until 12 May); Moetai Brotherson onwards
- President of the Assembly: Gaston Tong Sang (until 12 May); Antony Géros onwards

=== Events ===
- 16 April: First round of the 2023 French Polynesian legislative election
- 30 April: Second round of the 2023 French Polynesian legislative election

== Sports ==
- 19 – 27 August: French Polynesia at the 2023 World Athletics Championships

== Deaths ==
- 29 April – Ralph Taaviri, 68, trade unionist, independence activist, and environmentalist.
- 2 May – Matahi Brothers, 62, businessman.
- 11 May – Teina Maraeura, 72, politician, deputy (1986–2013, 2018–2023) and mayor of Rangiroa (1986–2021).
- 19 July – Raymond Bagnis, 91, doctor, ciguatera fish poisoning researcher.
- 22 December – John Mairai, 78, poet, actor, and playwright.
