= Ninito =

Ninito can refer to:

- Spanish for child
- Ninito Sumner (c. 1821 – 1898), Tahitian princess
- Ninith (Centuria) (ニニト, Ninito), fictional female slave in the Japanese web manga serial Centuria
