= Nancy Sumner =

Hawaiian high chiefess

Nancy Wahinekapu Sumner
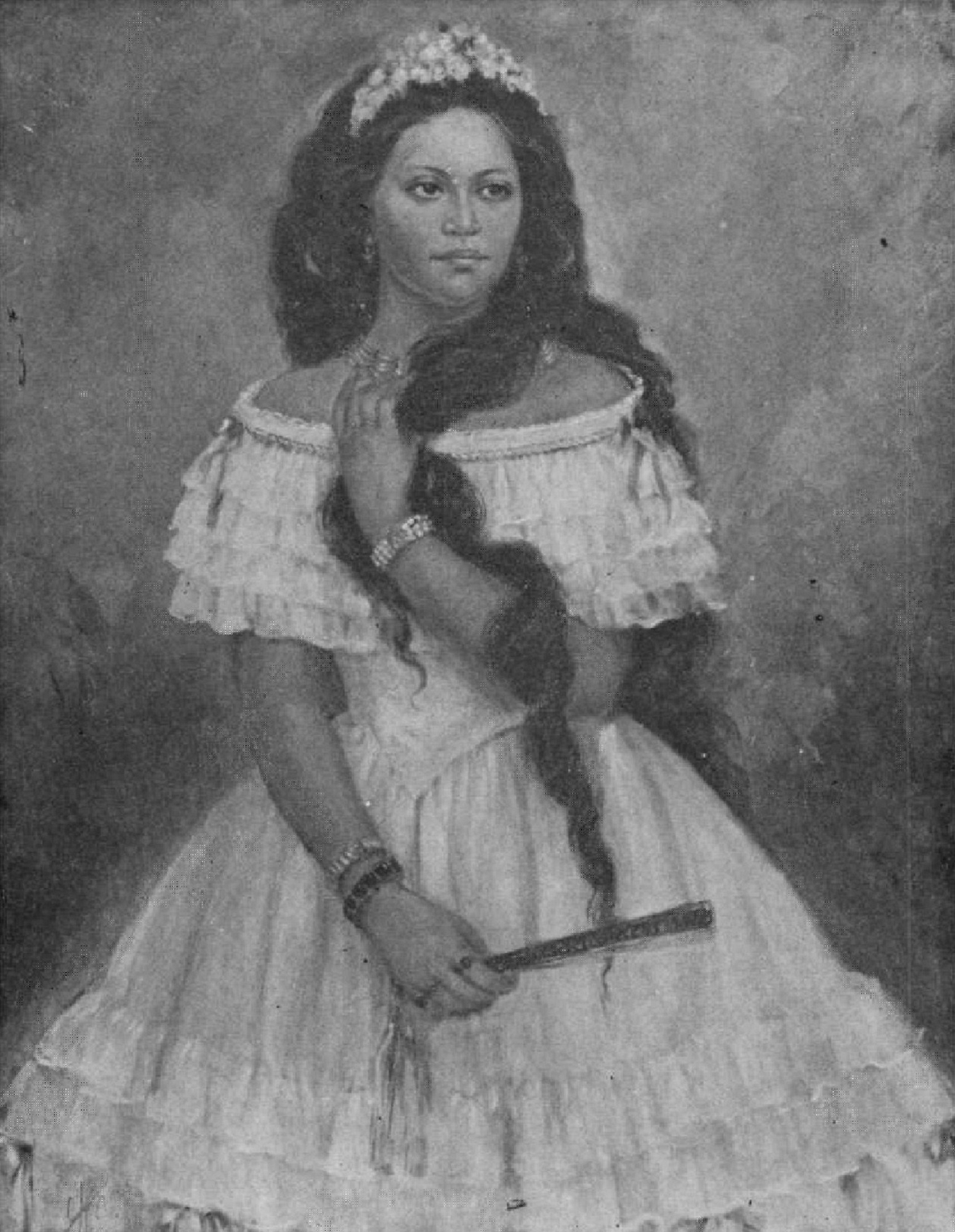
- Born: March 9, 1839; Honolulu, Oahu
- Died: January 10, 1895 (aged 55); Honolulu, Oahu
- Spouse: Charles Kuinao Ellis
- Issue: William Kualiʻi Sumner Ellis; Victoria Kualiʻi Sumner Ellis Buffandeau; John Kapilikea Sumner Ellis
Names
- Nancy Wahinekapu Sumner Ellis
- Father: William Keolaloa Kahānui Sumner
- Mother: Manaiʻula Tehuiariʻi

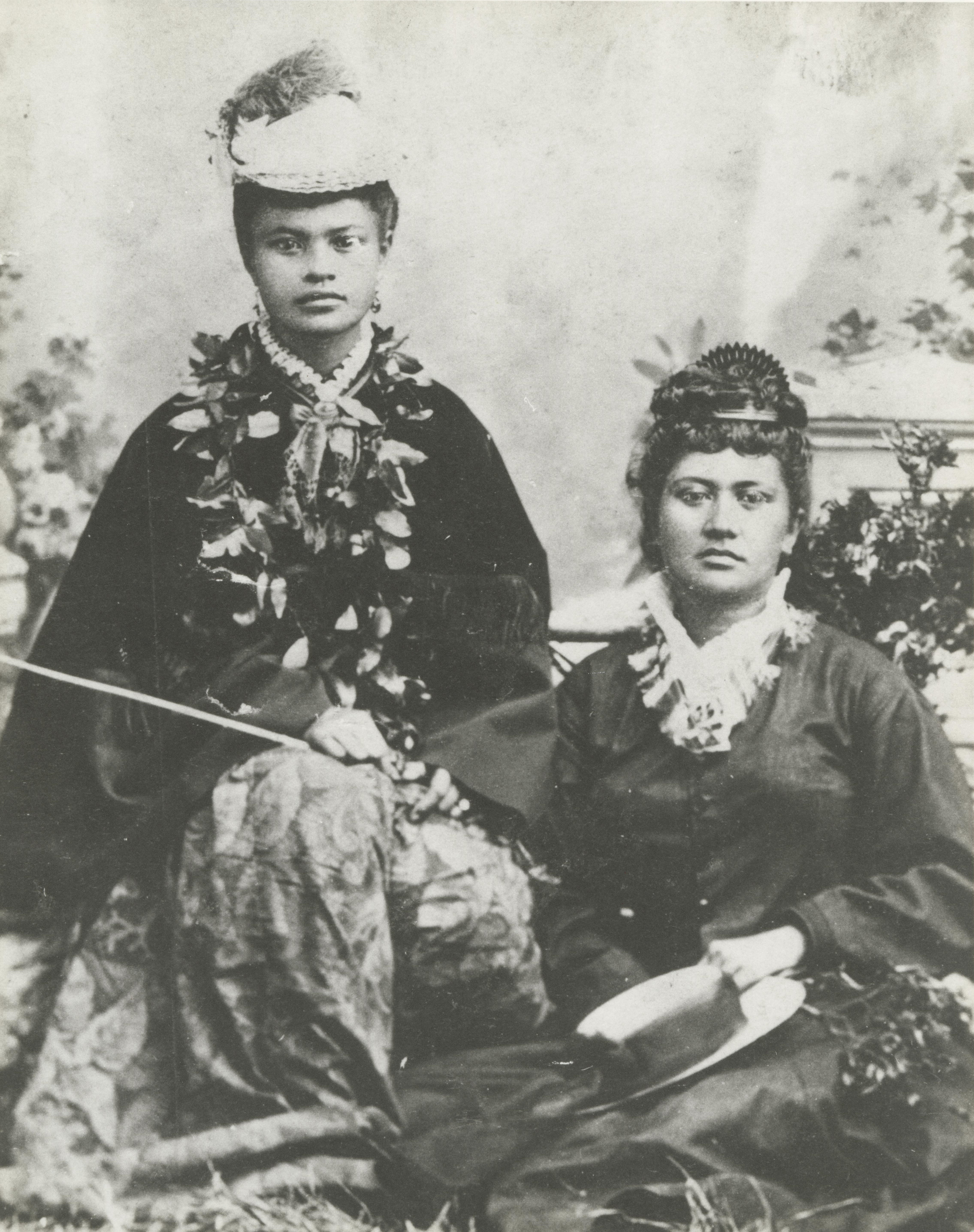
Nancy Sumner (right) in the fashion of a pāʻū rider

Nancy Wahinekapu Sumner (March 9, 1839 – January 10, 1895) was a high chiefess during the Kingdom of Hawaii of Hawaiian, Tahitian and English descent. She served as lady-in-waiting of Queen Emma and was one of the most prominent ladies of the Hawaiian royal court during the reigns of Kamehameha IV and Kamehameha V.

== Biography ==
=== Genealogy ===
Born in 1839, Nancy Wahinekapu Sumner was a member of the Sumner family of part English, Hawaiian, and Tahitian descent. She was the only child of William Keolaloa Kahānui Sumner, a hapa-haole (part Caucasian) Hawaiian high chief, and Manaiʻula Tehuiariʻi, a Tahitian princess and relative of the Pōmare Dynasty of Tahiti.

Her maternal grandfather Tute Tehuiariʻi, was the adoptive son of King Pōmare I and the royal chaplain of King Kamehameha III and Kamehameha IV. A cousin of her mother's was Princess Ninito Sumner, who had been betrothed to a Hawaiian prince but married her uncle John Kapilikea Sumner instead. She was informally adopted in the Hawaiian tradition of hānai by her uncle and aunt.

Her paternal grandparents were High Chiefess Keakuaaihue Kanealai Hua and the British Captain William Sumner (1786–1847), of Northampton. Captain Sumner arrived in Hawaii in 1807 as a cabin boy; initially befriending Kauai's king Kaumualii, he later served as a naval captain under King Kamehameha I, who united the Hawaiian Islands in 1810. Her paternal grandmother Hua was the cousin and hānai (adoptive) sister of high Chiefess Ahia Beckley, wife of Captain George Charles Beckley, who was one of the reputed designers of the Flag of Hawaii. Related to the Kamehamehas through Uminuikukaailani, her grandmother descended from the famous twins Kahānui and Kaha‘opulani, the Kohala chiefs who reared Kamehameha during his infancy. Her younger half-sister was Elizabeth Keawepoʻoʻole Sumner (1850–1911).

=== Court life and romance ===
She was educated by Hawaiian and foreign tutors and entered Mrs. Gummer's School for young girls at the age of seven. In 1854, she was placed at the Royal School, the former Chiefs' Children's School, to finish her formal education under the tutelage of missionary teacher Edward Griffin Beckwith. Her classmates included Princess Victoria Kamāmalu, the future Queen Liliuokalani and other members of the Hawaiian nobility.

Her family ancestry and connections to the ruling families of Hawaii and Tahiti allowed her to associate with many members of the royal family of Hawaii. Nancy became a prominent lady of the court during the reigns of King Kamehameha IV and King Kamehameha V, serving from 1858 as a lady-in-waiting to Queen Emma and becoming a close friend to Princess Victoria Kamāmalu.

Nancy Sumner was regarded as one of the most beautiful chiefesses of her generation, and many asked for her hand in marriage. In 1865, she met and befriended the Anglo-Irish aristocrat Lord Charles Beresford, R.N., while he was a midshipman on board the steam-corvette HMS Clio. Beresford fell in love with Nancy and proposed to her four years later in 1869, but she refused.

Nancy Sumner became notorious for her many romantic liaisons and suitors. However, after rejecting the suit of the reigning king Kamehameha V, she found herself ostracized from the Hawaiian royal court. She married her coachman Charles Kuinao Ellis (1852–1877) on December 11, 1873. Her husband possessed no wealth and was of low genealogical rank, which prompted her father William K. K. Sumner to disinherit her and her descendants. Her husband died in 1877, leaving her a widow. She focused the remainder of her life on educating their children.

Sumner and Ellis had three children: William Kualiʻi Sumner Ellis (1874–?), Victoria Kualiʻi Sumner Ellis (1875–1921) and John Kapilikea Sumner Ellis (1877–1914). Her two sons became famous Hawaiian musicians and were members of the Royal Hawaiian Band. William married Amelia Kealoha Nakapuahi while John married May Barnard and had one son Everett. Her daughter Victoria married Eugene Derville Buffandeau and has living descendants.

=== Death ===
Nancy Sumner herself died on January 10, 1895, from an asthma attack.

== Bibliography ==
- Daws, Gavan (1968). Shoal of Time: A History of the Hawaiian Islands. Honolulu: University Press of Hawaii. ISBN 978-0-8248-0324-7.
- Kaeo, Peter; Queen Emma (1976). Korn, Alfons L. (ed.). News from Molokai, Letters Between Peter Kaeo & Queen Emma, 1873–1876. Honolulu: The University Press of Hawaii. ISBN 978-0-8248-0399-5.
- Taylor, A. P. (1929). Ford, Alexander Hume (ed.). "Niniko, 'Garden of Rest'". The Mid-Pacific Magazine. 37 (5). T. H., A. H. Ford; Pan-Pacific Union, Pan-Pacific Research Institution: 433–440.
- Topolinski, John Renken Kahaʻi (January 1976). "Musical Diggings – Na Mele Ohana (Family Songs)". Haʻilono Mele. II (1). Honolulu: The Hawaiian Music Foundation: 3–8.
- Topolinski, John Renken Kahaʻi (February 1976). "Musical Diggings – The Sumner Family, A Legacy of Family Mele and Chants". Haʻilono Mele. II (2). Honolulu: The Hawaiian Music Foundation: 2–6.
- Topolinski, John Renken Kahaʻi (March 1976). "Musical Diggings – The Sumner Family". Haʻilono Mele. II (3). Honolulu: The Hawaiian Music Foundation: 3–8.
- Topolinski, John R. K. (1979). "Ellis Brothers: William and John" (PDF). In Kanahele, George S. (ed.). Hawaiian Music and Musicians: An Illustrated History. Honolulu: University Press of Hawaii. pp. 73–74. ISBN 978-0-8248-0578-4.
- Topolinski, John Renken Kahaʻi (1981). "Nancy Sumner, Hawaiian Courtlady". Hawaiian Journal of History. 15. Honolulu: Hawaiian Historical Society: 50–58. hdl:10524/285.
