= 2024 in French Polynesia =

- Decades: 2000s; 2010s; 2020s
- See also: Other events of 2024; Timeline of French Polynesian history

Events from 2024 in French Polynesia.

== Incumbents ==
- President: Moetai Brotherson
- President of the Assembly: Antony Géros

== Sports ==
- 27 July – 5 August: Surfing at the 2024 Summer Olympics is hosted in Tahiti

== Deaths ==
- 24 September – Tavana Salmon, 104, culture advocate
