= Manaiula Tehuiarii =

Manai‘ula Tehuiari‘i Sumner
- High Chiefess of Mōkapu
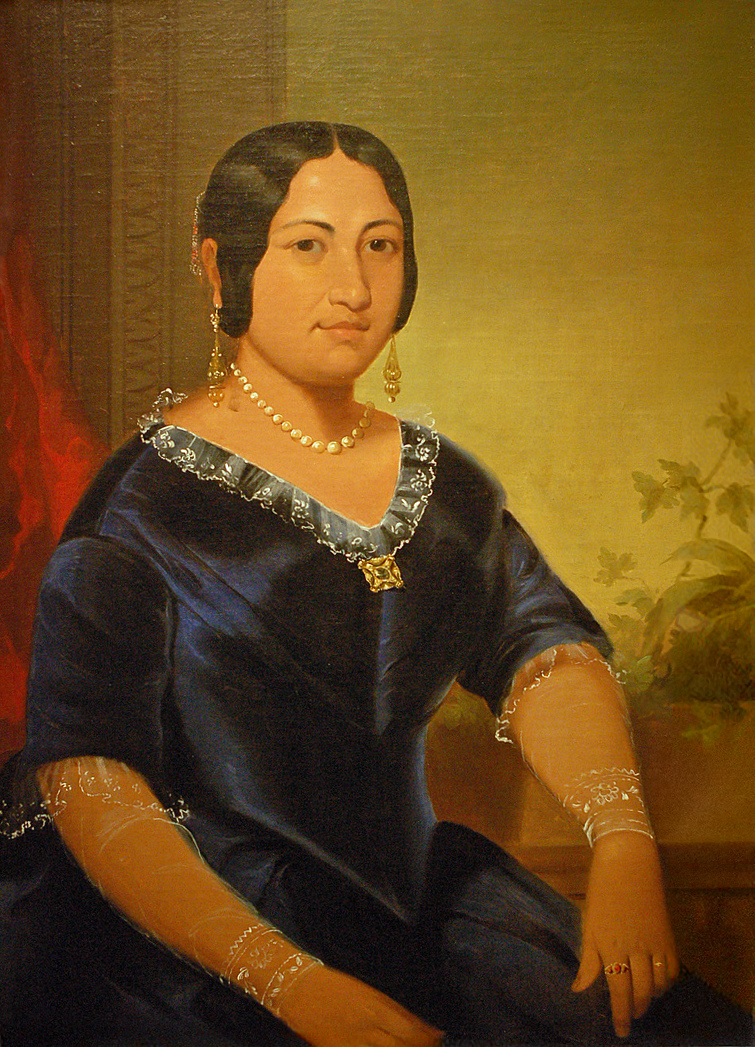
- Portrait of Manai‘ula by John Mix Stanley.
- Born: Tahiti
- Died: Hawaii
- Spouse: William Keolaloa Kahānui Sumner
- Issue: Nancy Wahinekapu Sumner Ellis
Names
- Manai‘ula Tehuiari‘i Sumner
- Father: Tute Tehuiari‘i

Manai‘ula Tehuiari‘i Sumner (fl. 1848) was a princess from the Kingdom of Tahiti who settled in the Kingdom of Hawaii. Her name has also been given as Mareilila, Malaiula, Mareiula, or Mareira.

== Biography ==
Manai‘ula Tehuiari‘i was born to Tute Tehuiari‘i, a chief from either Tahiti, or Moorea or Bora Bora. Her father was the adoptive son of King Pōmare I of Tahiti, who named him Tute in honor of Captain Cook (Tapena Tute in Polynesian). In 1826, he brought his entire family over to Hawaii, where he served as missionary and royal chaplain to Kamehameha III and Kamehameha IV.

It was during this time that Manai‘ula met and married High Chief William Keolaloa Kahānui Sumner, the son of Captain William Sumner and the High Chiefess Keakuaʻaihue. They had their only daughter Nancy Wahinekapu Sumner on March 9, 1839.

Another conflictory version of her life by historian Albert Pierce Taylor tells that she arrived in 1849, chaperoned by her elder sister Mauli, along with her cousin Ninito Tera‘iapo, as the guests Admiral De Tromelin. Ninito was betrothed to Prince Moses Kekūāiwa and Manai‘ula to Prince Lot Kapuāiwa, but the first prince died before their arrival and the second prince departed to Europe with his other brother. They were asked to wait for his return but not long after, both Ninito and Manai‘ula married the Sumner brothers, John Kapilikea Sumner and William Keolaloa Kahānui Sumner, respectively. This is chronologically impossible as Manai‘ula was already in Hawaii and married in 1849.

Manai‘ula was still alive in 1858 when she filed for the probate to the will of her deceased father. With her cousin Ninito Sumner, she composed a mele for the Princess Victoria Kamāmalu in 1862.

== Portrait ==
In approximately 1848, John Mix Stanley, an American painter of landscapes, and Native American portraits and tribal life, painted a portrait of Manaiula. The painting is on display at the Honolulu Museum of Art and was gifted in 2003 by Myrna Anne Kamamoakuali'i Kauapi'iokamakaala Kekuiapoiwa Buffandeau Topolinski in memory of her grandmother, Victoria Kuali'i Sumner Ellis Buffandeau, a granddaughter of Manaiula through her daughter Nancy.

== See also ==
- Hawaii–Tahiti relations
