= 2022 in French Polynesia =

- Decades: 2000s; 2010s; 2020s
- See also: Other events of 2022; Timeline of French Polynesian history

Events from 2022 in French Polynesia.

== Incumbents ==
- President: Édouard Fritch
- President of the Assembly: Gaston Tong Sang

== Events ==
Ongoing – COVID-19 pandemic in French Polynesia

- 22 September – USS Jackson arrives in Tahiti during an Oceana-based US Coast Guard operation.

== Sports ==
- 15 – 24 July: French Polynesia at the 2022 World Athletics Championships

== Deaths ==
- 31 July – Hubert Coppenrath, 91, Roman Catholic prelate, coadjutor archbishop (1997–1999) and archbishop (1999–2011) of Papeete
