= 2021 in French Polynesia =

- Decades: 2000s; 2010s; 2020s
- See also: Other events of 2021; Timeline of French Polynesian history

Events from 2021 in French Polynesia.

== Incumbents ==
- President: Édouard Fritch
- President of the Assembly: Gaston Tong Sang

== Events ==
Ongoing – COVID-19 pandemic in French Polynesia

- 23 August – The French overseas department of French Polynesia closes all schools and tightens its lockdown for two weeks amid an increase in the number of COVID-19 cases caused by the Delta variant.
- 3 September – French Polynesia extends their COVID-19 lockdown to September 20 following the deaths of more than 200 people over the past two weeks. The lockdown extension will apply to the Society Islands and the Tuamotus archipelago as the number of cases increase in those regions.

== Deaths ==
- 22 March – Tapeta Tetopata, 67, politician, member of the Assembly (since 2018)
