= Sand Island (Hawaii) =

Island in Honolulu County, Hawaii, United States

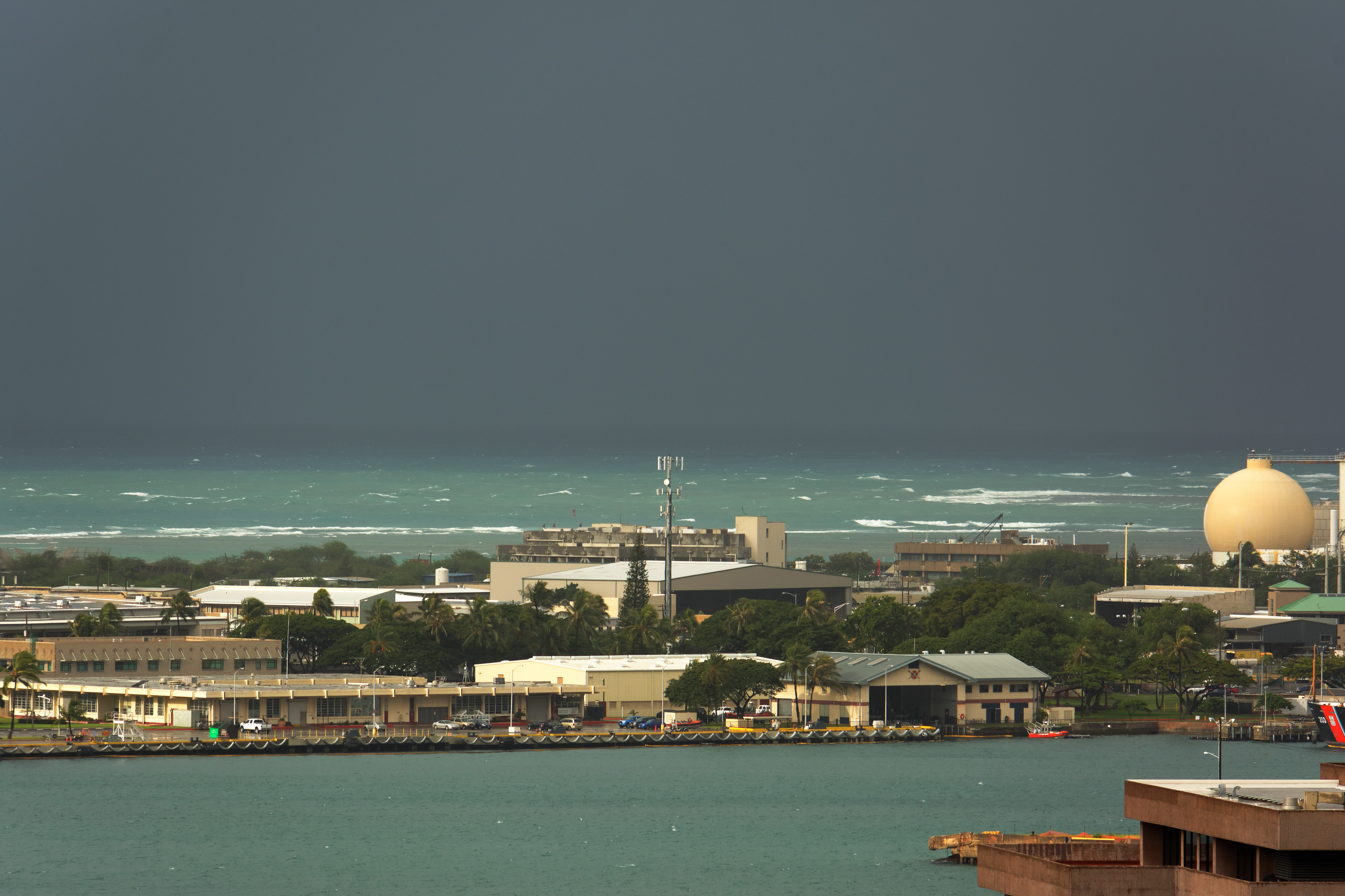
- Looking over Sand Island
- Interactive map of Sand Island

Geography
- Coordinates: 21°18′25″N 157°52′45″W

Administration
- United States

Sand Island, formerly known as Quarantine Island, is a small island within the city of Honolulu, Hawaii, United States. The island lies at the entrance to Honolulu Harbor.

== History ==
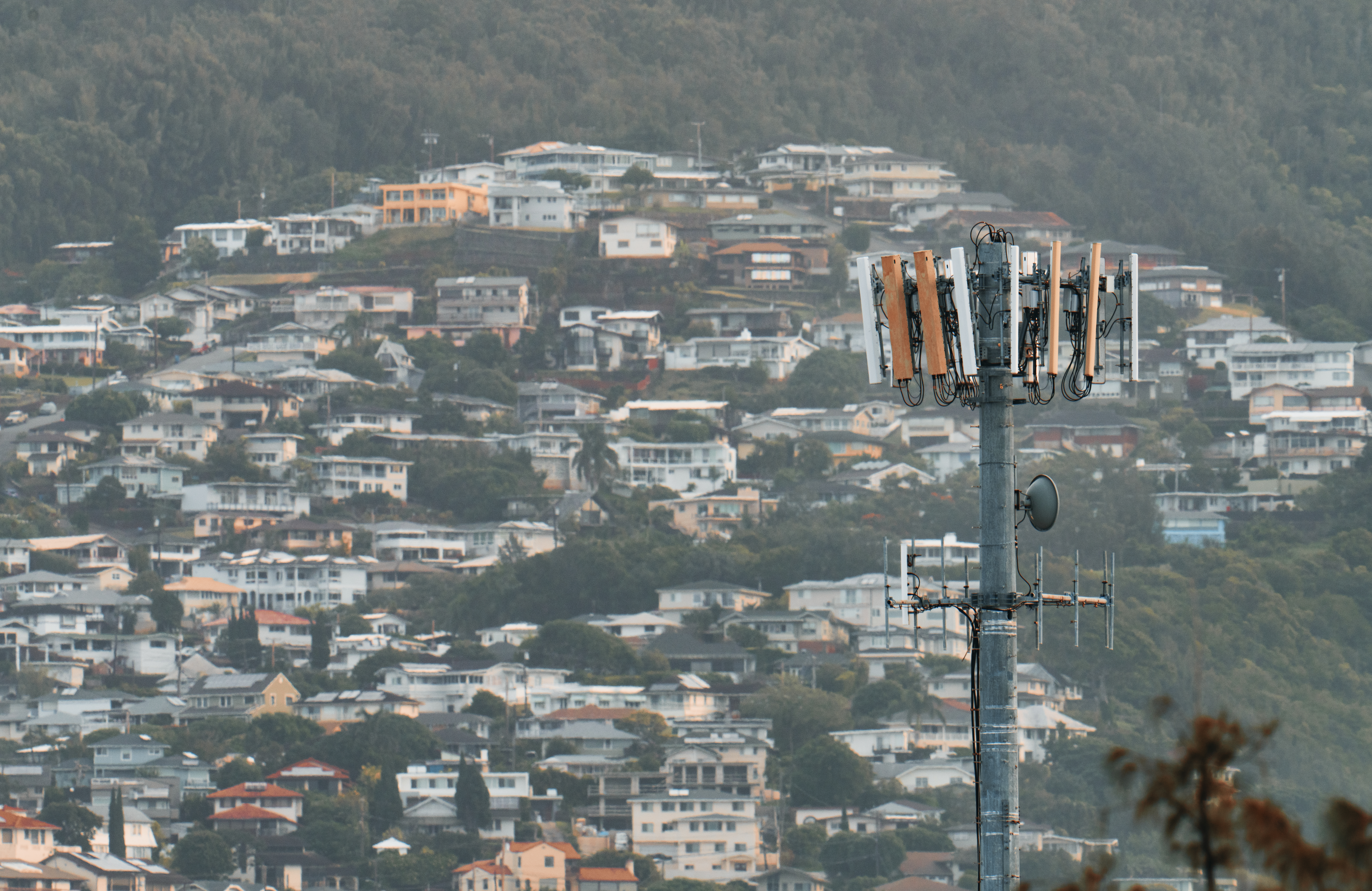
View from Sand Island

The island was once a small islet surrounded by the Kaholaloa fishing grounds, a shallow reef and sandbank, which King Kamehameha III granted to the British Captain William Sumner and his Hawaiian descendants in 1840. In 1869, the Hawaiian Kingdom's Board of Health leased the island from Captain Sumner's son William Keolaloa Sumner for $20 per month to establish a quarantine station for passengers suspected of carrying infectious diseases. The island then became known as Quarantine Island.

During World War II, Sand Island was used as an Army internment camp to house Japanese Americans as well as expatriates from Germany, Italy, and other Axis countries living in Hawaii. The camp opened in December 1941, soon after the Japanese attack on Pearl Harbor and the subsequent mass arrests of civilians accused—often without evidence—of espionage or other fifth column activity. Over 600 Hawaiian residents, many of them U.S. citizens, would pass through Sand Island before it was closed in March 1943. Most of the internees had been transferred to Army and Department of Justice internment camps on the mainland beginning in February 1942; the remaining 149 were moved to the newly constructed Honouliuli Internment Camp.

During the 1970s, over 100 homeless native Hawaiians cleaned up the garbage that filled the island, built homes and took up residence. In the early 1980s, 180 acres (73 hectares) of the island was reclaimed by the State of Hawaii for industrial and recreational development. Those who had taken up residence were evicted without compensation. Today Sand Island is home to a state recreation area, a U.S. Coast Guard base, a wastewater treatment facility, and an assortment of industrial facilities.

Sand Island is experiencing an issue with homelessness. Residents and city leaders have proposed the creation of a homeless camp. This has been an ongoing issue for several years. Even though there is much opposition, the city has disclosed plans on how it hopes to handle controversial public behaviors by some of the homeless population on the island. Their next step is to approach the full council for consideration.

== Geography and population ==
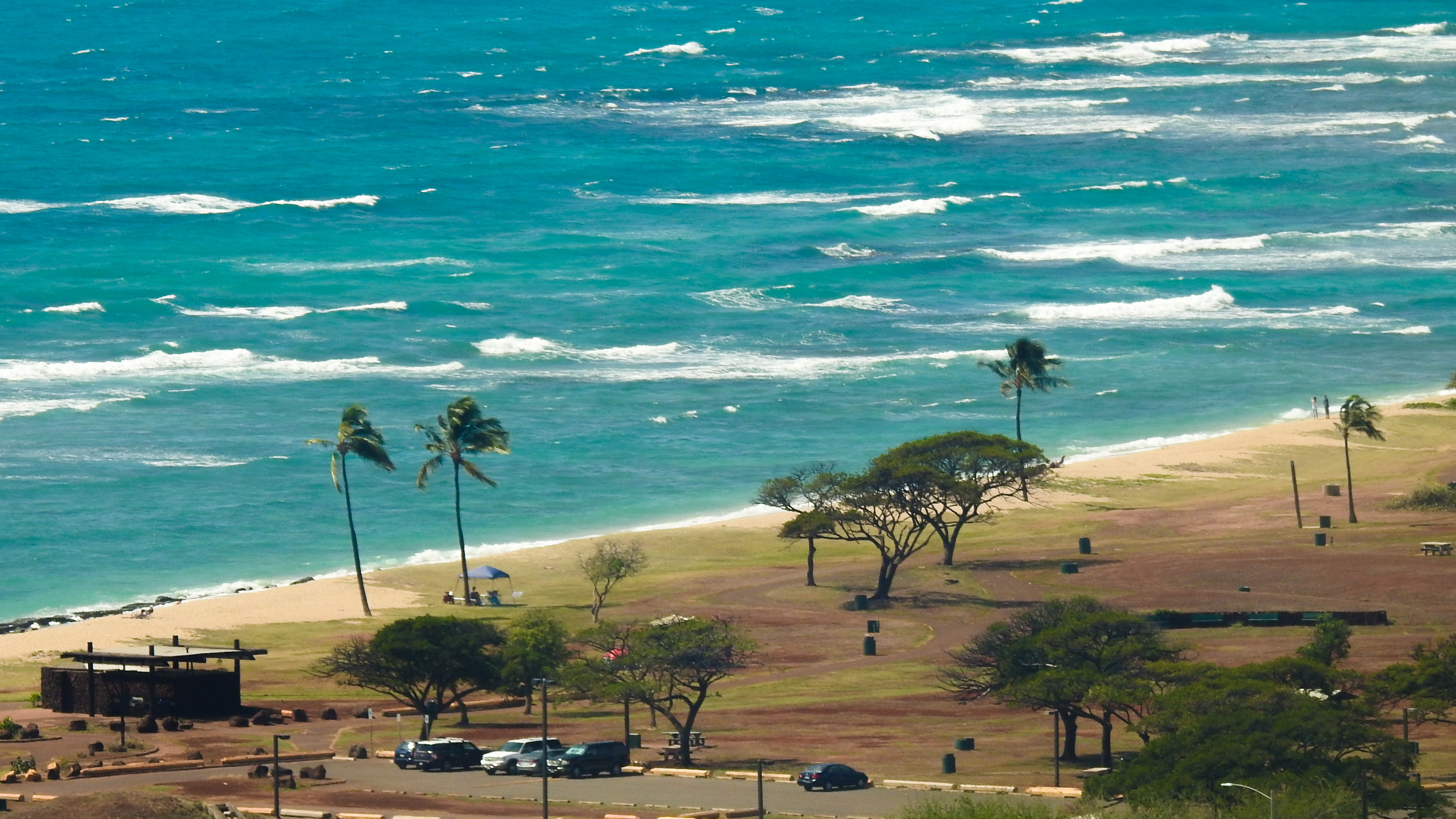
Sand Island Beach

According to the United States Census Bureau the island has a land area of 203.78 ha (0.7868 sq mi, or 503.55 acres) and a population of 184 persons as of the 2000 census.

== Climate ==
Sand Island's climate is mild year-round, with very little seasonal difference in temperatures; however, there is a very distinct difference between the wet and dry season. Summer high temperatures range from 87 to 91 °F (31 to 33 °C), with winter highs ranging from 77 to 85 °F (25 to 29 °C). Precipitation is light year round, especially in the summer. There are approximately 3,100 hours of sunshine annually.

== See also ==
- Japanese American internment
