= 2020 in French Polynesia =

- Decades: 2000s; 2010s; 2020s
- See also: Other events of 2020; Timeline of French Polynesian history

Events from 2020 in French Polynesia.

== Incumbents ==
- President: Édouard Fritch
- President of the Assembly: Gaston Tong Sang

== Events ==
Ongoing – COVID-19 pandemic in French Polynesia

- 11 March – The first case of COVID-19 in the territory was confirmed. The first patient was Maina Sage, a member of the French National Assembly.
- 4 April – A ban on sales of alcohol was extended until the pandemic was over.
