= 2027 in French Polynesia =

- Decades: 2000s; 2010s; 2020s
- See also: Other events of 2027; Timeline of French Polynesian history

Events from 2027 in French Polynesia.

== Events ==
=== Predicted and scheduled ===
- 24 July–7 August – 2027 Pacific Games in Pirae, Tahiti

== Holidays ==
- 1 January – New Year's Day
- 5 March – Missionary Day
- 26 March – Good Friday
- 28 March – Easter Sunday
- 29 March – Easter Monday
- 1 May – International Workers' Day
- 6 May – Ascension Day
- 8 May – Victory in Europe Day
- 17 May – Whit Monday
- 14 July – Bastille Day
- 15 August – Assumption Day
- 1 November – All Saints' Day
- 11 November – Armistice Day
- 20 November – Matari'i
- 25 December – Christmas Day

== See also ==
- Overseas country of France
