= 2026 in French Polynesia =

- Decades: 2000s; 2010s; 2020s
- See also: Other events of 2026; Timeline of French Polynesian history

Events from 2026 in French Polynesia.

== Incumbents ==
- President: Moetai Brotherson
- President of the Assembly: Antony Géros

== Events ==
=== Predicted and scheduled ===
- 22–31 August – 2026 OFC Beach Soccer Men's Nations Cup

== Holidays ==
- 1 January – New Year's Day
- 5 March – Missionary Day
- 3 April – Good Friday
- 5 April – Easter Sunday
- 6 April – Easter Monday
- 1 May – International Workers' Day
- 8 May – Victory in Europe Day
- 14 May – Ascension Day
- 24 May – Whit Sunday
- 25 May – Whit Monday
- 14 July – Bastille Day
- 15 August – Assumption Day
- 1 November – All Saints' Day
- 11 November – Armistice Day
- 20 November – Matari'i
- 25 December – Christmas Day

== See also ==
- Overseas country of France
