= Moses Kekūāiwa =

Prince of Hawaiʻi (1829–1848)

- Prince of Hawaii
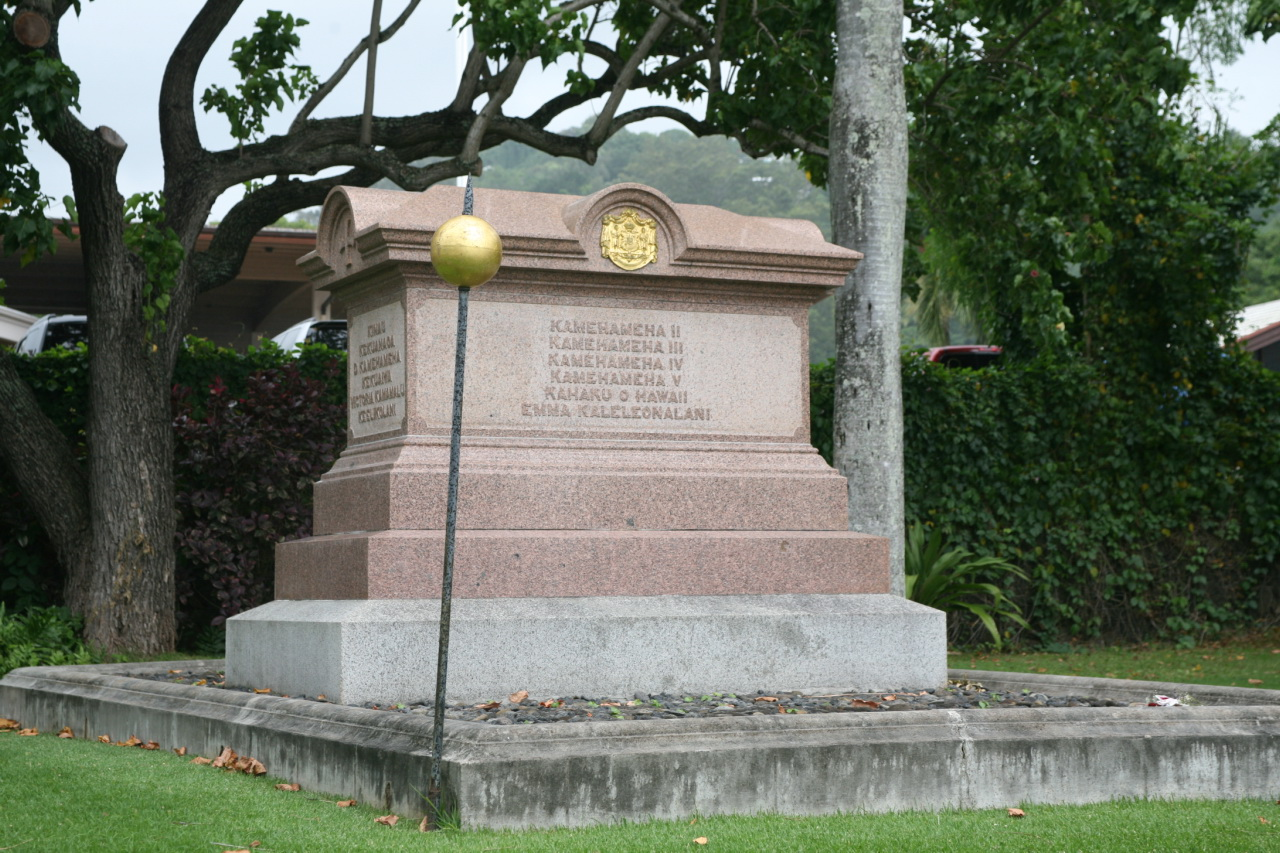
- The Kamehameha Tomb at Mauna ʻAla, his name is inscribed on the left side of the monument under "Kekuaiwa".
- Born: July 20, 1829; Honolulu, Oʻahu
- Died: November 24, 1848 (aged 19); Honolulu, Oʻahu
- Burial: December 30, 1848; Pohukaina Tomb; October 30, 1865; Mauna Ala Royal Mausoleum
Names
- Moses Kekūāiwa
- House: House of Kamehameha
- Father: Kekūanaōʻa; Kaikioʻewa (hānai)
- Mother: Kīnaʻu; Emilia Keaweamahi (hānai)

Moses Kekūāiwa (July 20, 1829 – November 24, 1848) was a Hawaiian prince and a member of the House of Kamehameha, the ruling family of Hawaiian Kingdom. He was the eldest surviving son of Kīnaʻu and Kekūanaōʻa, and was the older brother of King Kamehameha IV and King Kamehameha V. As a grandson of King Kamehameha I, Kekūāiwa was chosen to attend the Chiefs' Children's School (later renamed Royal School), where he was taught, alongside his siblings and royal cousins, by the American missionary Amos Starr Cooke and his wife, Juliette Montague Cooke. Kekūāiwa was declared eligible to succeed to the Hawaiian throne by his uncle King Kamehameha III, and was regarded as a potential future Governor of Kauaʻi. His upbringing within the traditional Hawaiian aliʻi (noble) environment sometimes conflicted with the strict moral discipline imposed by the school’s missionary teachers, and these tensions contributed to his expulsion from the school in 1847. Kekūāiwa died at the age of nineteen during the 1848 measles epidemic, before assuming any major political role.

== Early life and family ==
Moses Kekūāiwa was born on July 20, 1829, in Honolulu, to Mataio Kekūanaōʻa and Elizabeth Kīnaʻu. The birth was recorded by American missionary Levi Chamberlain and American merchant Stephen Reynolds, who called the child "a fine boy". He was named Kekūāiwa after his maternal aunt Queen Kamāmalu, the favorite wife of Kamehameha II, who was also known as Kamehamalu Kekūāiwaokalani. According to the journals of American missionary Levi Chamberlain, Kekūāiwa was baptized on August 23, 1829.

Kekūāiwa was the second son of Kekūanaōʻa and Kīnaʻu, and a grandson of Kamehameha I through his mother, who was known as Kaʻahumanu II when she was serving as regent and Kuhina Nui. Kekūāiwa's maternal grandmother, Kalākua Kaheiheimālie, was one of the wives of Kamehameha I, whom he had wed under the rites of hoao-wohi. Kaheiheimālie was also the younger sister of Queen Kaʻahumanu, the king's favorite wife, who co-ruled as Kuhina Nui with his successors Kamehameha II and Kamehameha III starting in 1819.

Moses Kekūāiwa had three brothers; David Kamehameha (1828–1835), Lot Kapuāiwa (1830–1872), and Alexander Liholiho (1834–1863); and a sister, Princess Victoria Kamāmalu (1838–1866). Their Hawaiian contemporaries considered these five siblings to be of divine rank. Kekūāiwa had other siblings: an unnamed, elder half-brother from his mother's previous marriage to Kahalaiʻa Luanuʻu who died young, and a half-sister, Ruth Keʻelikōlani (1826–1883), from his father's previous marriage to Pauahi.

Shortly after his birth, Kekūāiwa was adopted according to Hawaiian custom (hānai) by High Chief Kaikioʻewa, the then-incumbent Governor of Kauaʻi and former guardian of King Kamehameha III, and Kaikioʻewa's wife Emilia Keaweamahi. It was expected from an early age Kekūāiwa would succeed his adoptive father and become Governor of Kauaʻi.

== Education ==
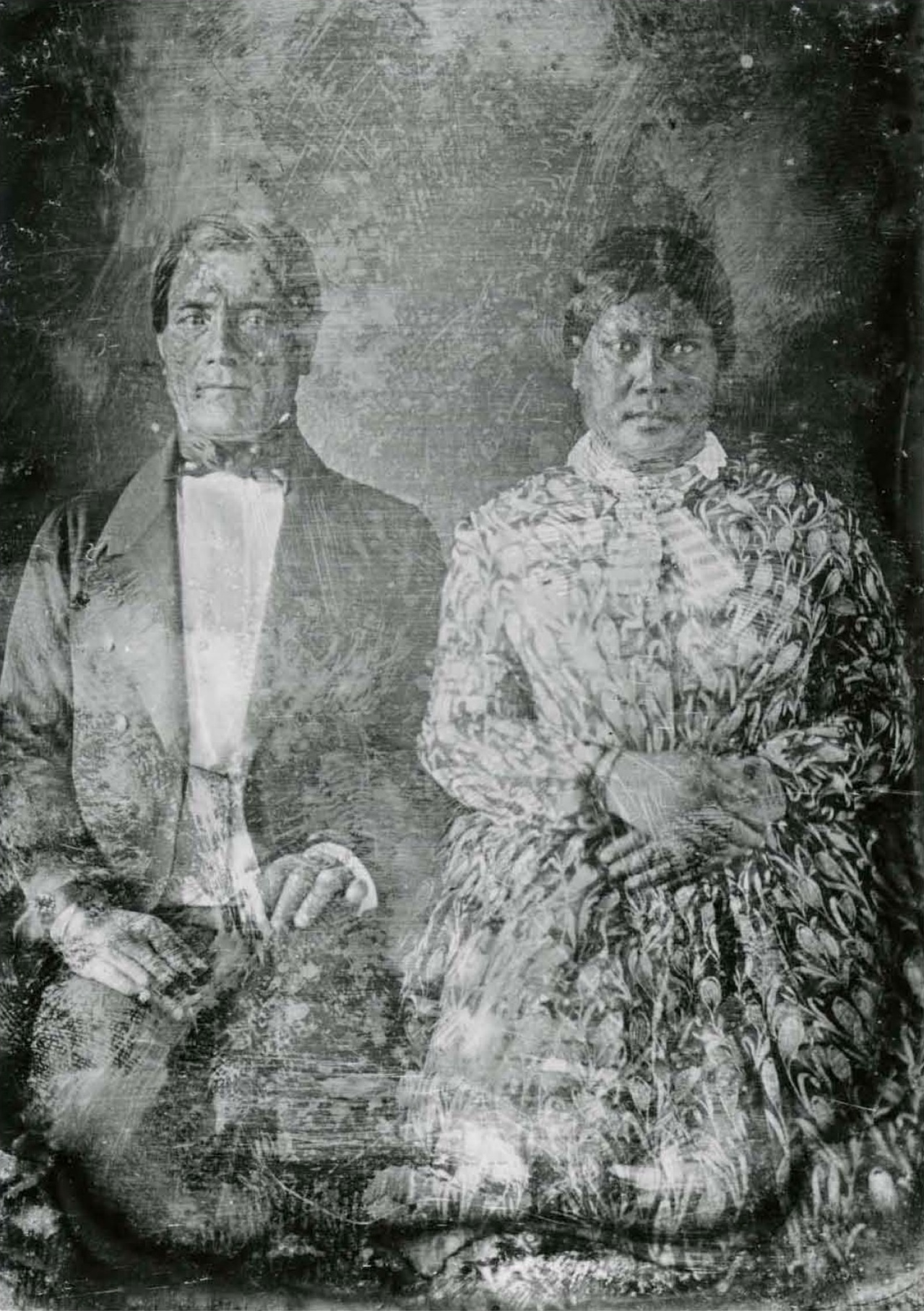
John Papa ʻĪʻī and Sarai Hiwauli, the royal kahu in charge of the royal children, ca. 1851

In January 1839, Kaikioʻewa returned the nine-year-old Kekūāiwa to the care of his parents Kekūanaōʻa and Kīnaʻu so he could attend school in Honolulu. According to contemporary sources by Sereno Edwards Bishop, Kekūāiwa fiercely resisted being separated from his guardian. Because of his high rank, no one dared to use force on Kekūāiwa until his father sent soldiers to take him to the palace.

Kekūāiwa's uncle, King Kamehameha III, placed him in the Chiefs' Children's School (later renamed Royal School), the exclusive school for children eligible to be rulers. Along with his other classmates, Kamehameha III chose Kekūāiwa to be eligible for the throne of the Hawaiian Kingdom. The school was taught by the American missionary couple Amos Starr Cooke and Juliette Montague Cooke. The king appointed John Papa ʻĪʻī and his wife Sarai Hiwauli, who were originally only the kahu (caretakers) of Princess Victoria Kamāmalu, as kahu to the royal children. Kekūāiwa started attending the school on February 14, 1839, when it was a day school. Within days, Amos Cooke noted Kekūāiwa's unease and repeated desire to leave early, writing that Kekūāiwa "continues to come, but he is rather uneasy. He requests to go every day before school closes. I hardly know what to do about it." The school was officially established as a boarding school in April 1840.

On April 4, 1839, Kekūāiwa's biological mother, Kīnaʻu, died during a mumps epidemic. A week later, his hānai father, Kaikioʻewa, died in the same epidemic. Kekūāiwa had also contracted mumps but was able to recover. After recovering, he returned to Kauaʻi in June to be proclaimed the governor of the island, but never assumed official duties due to his age. In his lifetime, Kekūāiwa was referred to as the "prospective Governor of Kauaʻi", the nominal governor during that time. His hānai mother Keaweamahi, and later his cousin Kekauʻōnohi and Paul Kanoa, were considered placeholders for the position until Kekūāiwa came of age.

=== Conflict with the Cookes ===
The Cookes often used corporal punishment to discipline the students. In 1839, Amos Cooke described how he had "to discipline Moses to make him mind". The following day, Cooke struck Alexander on the head, and in defense of his brother, Kekūāiwa replied: "he keiki a ke ali'i oia nei" ("He is the son of the chief" (i.e., King Kamehameha III). Cooke replied: "I am the king of this school". Punishments included whippings, confinement, and the withholding of food. Corporal punishment was considered especially humiliating for the royal children because it violated the traditional sacredness (kapu) associated with the bodies of the aliʻi. Kekūāiwa, and his brothers Alexander and Lot, were considered the most troublesome of the group of students, and received the most disciplinary actions from Cooke. As the brothers grew, they became more difficult for Cooke to physically control. Kekūāiwa weighed 92.5 pounds (42.0 kg) at age twelve and 152 pounds (69 kg) at age fourteen, suggesting a comparatively robust build for his age. By comparison, Amos Cooke, who was described as little more than five feet (150 cm) tall, weighed less than 110 pounds (50 kg). Cooke also described incidents of impropriety in which Kekūāiwa, Lot, and the other boys entered the sleeping quarters of female students. One of their classmates, Abigail Maheha, later became pregnant and left the school. Although no contemporary sources identify the father of the child, historian Julie Kaomea said Lot may have been the father.

Amos Cooke recorded repeated incidents of the brothers leaving the school grounds at night, smoking cigars and drinking alcohol. The boys were often locked in their bedrooms at night to prevent what Cooke called "nightwalking". The disciplinary situation became a governmental concern in 1845, when Amos Cooke discovered a coded letter describing how Kekūāiwa wished to run away with his brothers to Tahiti. Writing to a Mr. Binns and Mr. St. John as "John David Hammond, Commander in Chief of the H Army", it said:

... We cannot endure it ... My dear friends, my pen & ink cannot express what I wish to say. My dear friends make haste & tell me what is the best way for us to clear out as fast as we can. I cannot stay in the land of my birth. I cannot stay in the land where my forefathers had die. For they shamefully treated us. Farewell to my native land. The land of my birth. Write me soon & let me know what is your thought. With regret I wrote this letter to you, you must not say that I only wish to cut you out of your business. And to ruin your characters. It was the love of liberty that enticed us to leave our native shores. Do write me today. Can you make a bargain with the captain of the Brig Euphemia to take us down to Tahiki on the first port he would on some of these Southern Islands. If we would leave these Island, then I shall bid farewell to my native land. And see no more the face of my parents ...

The king and the high chiefs fully backed the Cookes' disciplinary actions. On September 5, 1845, their uncle, King Kamehameha III, reprimanded the three brothers in the presence of his Privy Council of State and their teachers, Amos Cooke and Thomas Douglass.

His Majesty turned and spoke to Moses Kekuaiwa, Liholiho and Lot. Saying to them I have heard of your fault, your teachers have been patient with you, I heard no report of the matter, but your teacher in his trouble has complained to me of your use of intoxicating liquors, your going out at night, and your associating with bad people. Once I did thus but have seen the evil of it and forsaken that way. Now you will do the same will you? If such is your course you will not be children (heirs) of Kinau. I am her child (heir) You have also said you would abandon the country and go to Tahiti. Whence is this idea of yours? I thought you were pursuing knowledge, and when you are adult you are expected to take up the good work which we are doing if you are compent [sic] to do it. This what I require.

=== Expulsion from school ===
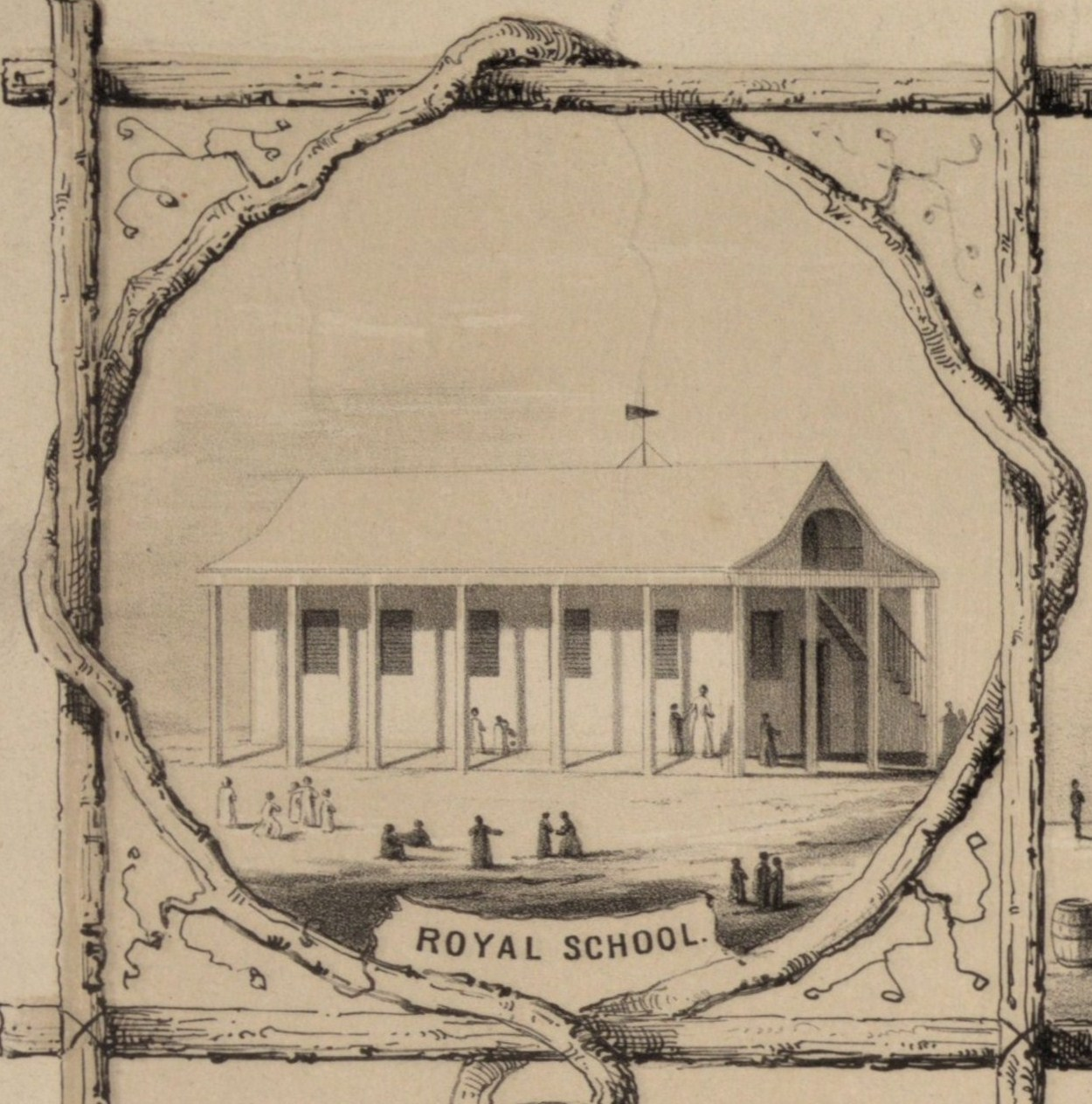
The Royal School in 1853, lithographed by Paul Emmert

On the night of December 26, 1846, ʻĪʻī, Sarai, and Douglass caught Kekūāiwa attempting to visit Queen Kalama. According to his confession written on January 8, 1847, he secretly left the school grounds on three occasions between December 19 and 26 in hopes of seeing the Queen, though he insisted she was not hewa (guilty). Amos Cooke had previously reprimanded Kekūāiwa for attempting to visit the Queen. According to Kaomea, these meetings between Kekūāiwa and Kalama may have been part of a traditional Hawaiian practice, in which an older chiefess instructs a young chief in sexual education—a practice that clashed with the strict moral beliefs of the American missionaries, who viewed it as adultery.

On February 1, 1847, King Kamehameha III and the Privy Council made Kekūāiwa sign a document expelling him from the school and relinquishing control of his property to his father, Kekūanaōʻa, until he reached majority. The minutes of the Privy Council recorded his offense as "constantly falling into bad vices, drinking intoxicating liquors, going out nights and of being disobedient to the teachers, which have a tendency of leading the rest of the students astray". ʻĪʻī was appointed Kekūāiwa's kahu and William Richards was appointed his guardian.

== Life outside school ==
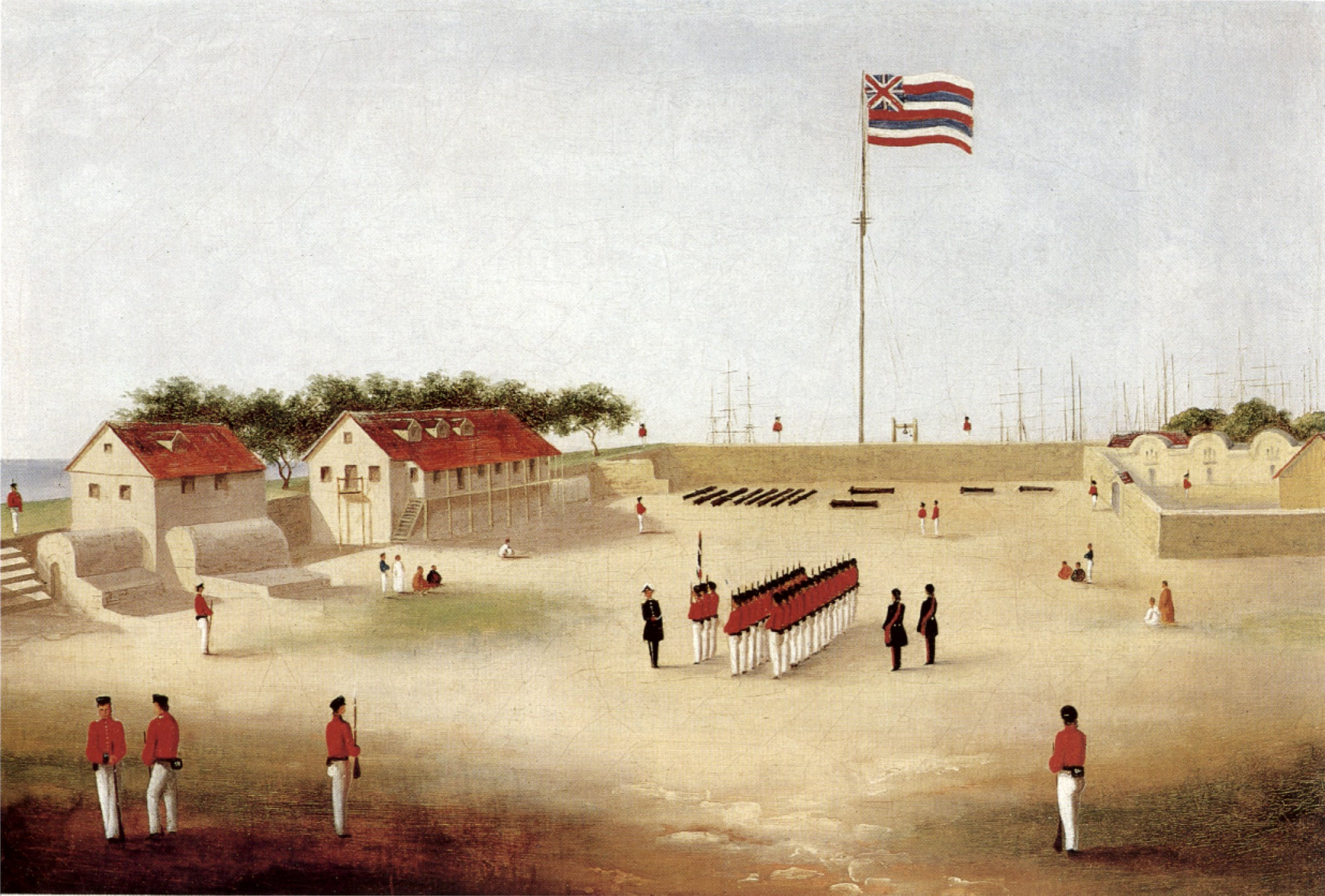
Interior of the Honolulu Fort in 1853, by Paul Emmert.

After leaving school, Moses Kekūāiwa lived with his father Kekūanaōʻa at Honolulu Fort. Few government records indicate Kekūāiwa continued to perform some duties connected to the Foreign Office despite his disciplinary action. On March 16, 1847, Minister of Foreign Affairs Robert Crichton Wyllie asked Kekūāiwa to request that his father provide two soldiers to salute the British Consul General Guillermo Miller. A similar request on February 2, 1848, involved sending soldiers to present arms to the French Consul. On May 22, 1848, he was also asked to translate and deliver a letter to his father, showing his role as both intermediary and translator in official government communication for his father.

Kekūāiwa may have experienced some financial trouble and was described as a spendthrift. On June 26, 1847, his father published a notice in the newspaper The Polynesian asking no one to trust his son, stating Kekūāiwa would not pay any of his debts.

=== Landholdings ===
Moses Kekūāiwa inherited a number of land parcels from his royal relatives, the bulk of them coming from his hānai father Kaikioʻewa. Kekūāiwa and his siblings were among the largest landholders in the islands, although his properties were considerably fewer than those of his sister Victoria Kamāmalu. Prior to 1848, these landholdings consisted of 21 ʻĀina, mostly on Kauaʻi and Maui. Kekūāiwa relinquished 12 of these landholdings to the King during the Great Māhele of 1848 and received nine back. In the Māhele division, nine ʻāina were set apart for Kekūāiwa: Kōloa, and Wahiawā on Kauaʻi; seven ʻili of Kapālama on Oʻahu, namely Kapālama, Māliko, Kaluapilau, Hanahome, Kealia, Makela, and Kalanakila; Kaʻohai on Lānaʻi; Honokōhau and ʻAlio on Maui; and ʻŌmaʻo, Puʻoa, and Nanawale on Hawaiʻi Island.

Following his expulsion from school, most of Kekūāiwa's properties were temporarily taken from him until he reached majority, leaving him with three holdings: Kapālama on Oʻahu, Kaʻohai on Lānaʻi, and ʻAlio in Lahaina on Maui. After his death, Kekūāiwa's lands were inherited by his father and siblings. In 1859, the Hawaiian legislature authorized compensation to the heirs of Moses Kekūāiwa for government sales and leases of portions of his lands at Kōloa, Kauaʻi. All these lands were eventually passed to his cousin Bernice Pauahi Bishop, who after her death established the Bernice Pauahi Bishop Estate, which continues to fund the Kamehameha Schools.

=== Betrothal to Tahitian princess ===
Kekūāiwa, as the eldest male of his generation and a lineal descendant of Kamehameha I, was expected to marry a high chiefess of rank to continue the royal line. He was originally betrothed to his classmate Jane Loeau, the eldest female student at the Royal School and the daughter of the Governess of Oʻahu, Kuini Liliha. After his expulsion from school, the Cookes encouraged Liliha to marry the American lawyer John Jasper instead of Kekūāiwa.

In July 1848, two Tahitian women arrived in Honolulu with letters from Queen Pōmare IV of Tahiti in which she proposed the union of one of her relatives to Kekūāiwa. Amos Cooke was personally opposed to the proposal but wrote: "It seems to take with the Chiefs ..." Kekūāiwa was engaged to the Tahitian Princess Ninito Teraʻiapo (d. 1898) in one of a series of historical attempts at marriage alliances between the royals of Hawaii and Tahiti. Teraʻiapo was a niece of Tute Tehuiari'i, the private chaplain of Kamehameha III, and a cousin of Manaiula Tehuiarii. She was also a female relative of Queen Pōmare IV and the sister of High Chiefess Ariitaimai, the mother of Queen Marau, wife of Pōmare V, the last King of Tahiti. Ninito set sail for Hawaii but arrived in Honolulu to the news of his death. She settled in Hawaii and married a Hawaiian chief, John Kapilikea Sumner.

According to the later writings of historian Albert Pierce Taylor, Kekūāiwa assembled a company of young Hawaiian men and drilled them in military combat in the Koʻolau district of Oʻahu. The explanation was that he planned to lead a voyage of conquest to Tahiti and the Society Islands, but it was also suspected he planned to seize the Hawaiian throne by force. Taylor did not assign a year to these events.

== Death and legacy ==
The measles epidemic of 1848–49 was brought to Hilo by an American warship. During this short period, a combination of measles, whooping cough, and influenza epidemics killed 10,000 people, mostly Native Hawaiians. In October, Kekūāiwa developed whooping cough symptoms and got progressively worse. American merchant Gorham D. Gilman, who visited Hawaiʻi in 1848, wrote a brief description of Kekūāiwa shortly before Kekūāiwa's death, and apparently without full knowledge of the circumstances of his expulsion from the Royal School. Gilman wrote:

The habits & tastes of this young man were quite firmly fixed as he had been wholly under native influence which is not the best adapted to instruct a young mind in the paths of virtue. Moses however was not naturally a viscously—nor maliciously inclined—& He remained at the school enjoying and improving its advantages in a manner creditable both to himself & his instructors—till his health and other circumstances induced his Father to take him from school and he has since lived with his Father at the Fort. He looks feeble—as if he did not enjoy good health. He is the prospective Gov of Kauai—having the same claims as his Brother to the Island of Maui—but his health would not allow his taking the charge even should other weightier objections be removed.

Amos Cooke, ʻĪʻī, and his former classmates visited and prayed with the ailing Kekūāiwa. Cooke wrote: "About noon [on November 24] I went & found him very low, as I thought. I said that Jesus Christ alone could afford him assistance. He replied, 'I hope so.'" Kekūāiwa died around 4:30 p.m. on November 24, 1848, in Honolulu in the presence of his two brothers. Kekūāiwa was 19 years old, unmarried, and without children.

=== Funeral ===
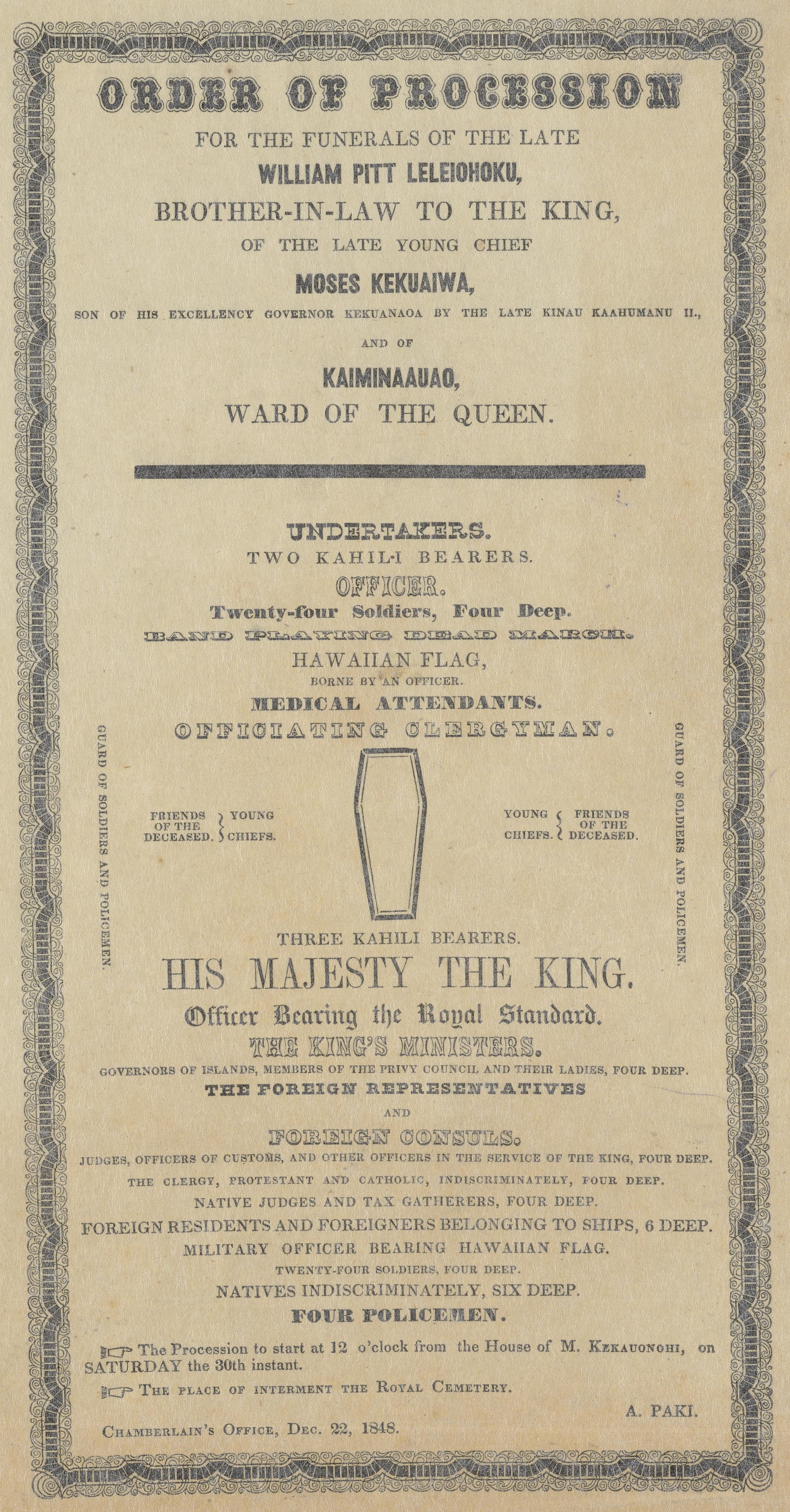
Order of procession for the funeral of Leleiohoku, Kekūāiwa and Kaʻiminaʻauao

Besides Kekūāiwa, other high chiefs who died in the epidemics were William Pitt Leleiohoku I (husband of his half-sister and father of his classmate John William Pitt Kīnaʻu) and the three-year-old Kaʻiminaʻauao, the hānai daughter of Queen Kalama and younger sister of his classmates Kalākaua and Liliʻuokalani. The bodies of the deceased were embalmed with alcohol in lead coffins and placed inside wooden coffins. Moses Kekūāiwa's funeral service was held on December 30, 1848, alongside those of Leleiohoku and Kaʻiminaʻauao. The funeral procession, which began at his cousin Kekauʻōnohi's residence, included the king and queen, members of the royal family, cabinet ministers, governors, members of the Privy Council, high chiefs, foreign consuls and representatives, clergy, and government officials. It was accompanied by soldiers, kāhili bearers, and the Royal Standard. They were buried at the Royal Cemetery in the presence of both Hawaiian subjects and foreign residents. His hānai mother, Keaweamahi, also died on the same day and had her service on the same day, although she was not included in the state funeral of the three chiefs.

Kekūāiwa was initially buried in the Pohukaina Tomb, located on the grounds of ʻIolani Palace. On October 30, 1865, his remains, along with those of his mother and other royals, were moved in a midnight torchlight procession led by his father and brother Kamehameha V, to the newly constructed Royal Mausoleum at Mauna ʻAla in the Nuʻuanu Valley. In 1887, after the Mausoleum building became too crowded, the coffins belonging to members of the Kamehameha Dynasty, including Kekūāiwa's, were moved to the newly built Kamehameha Tomb. The name "Kekuaiwa" was inscribed on the ʻewa (western) side of the monument above his final resting place.

=== Memory and legacy ===
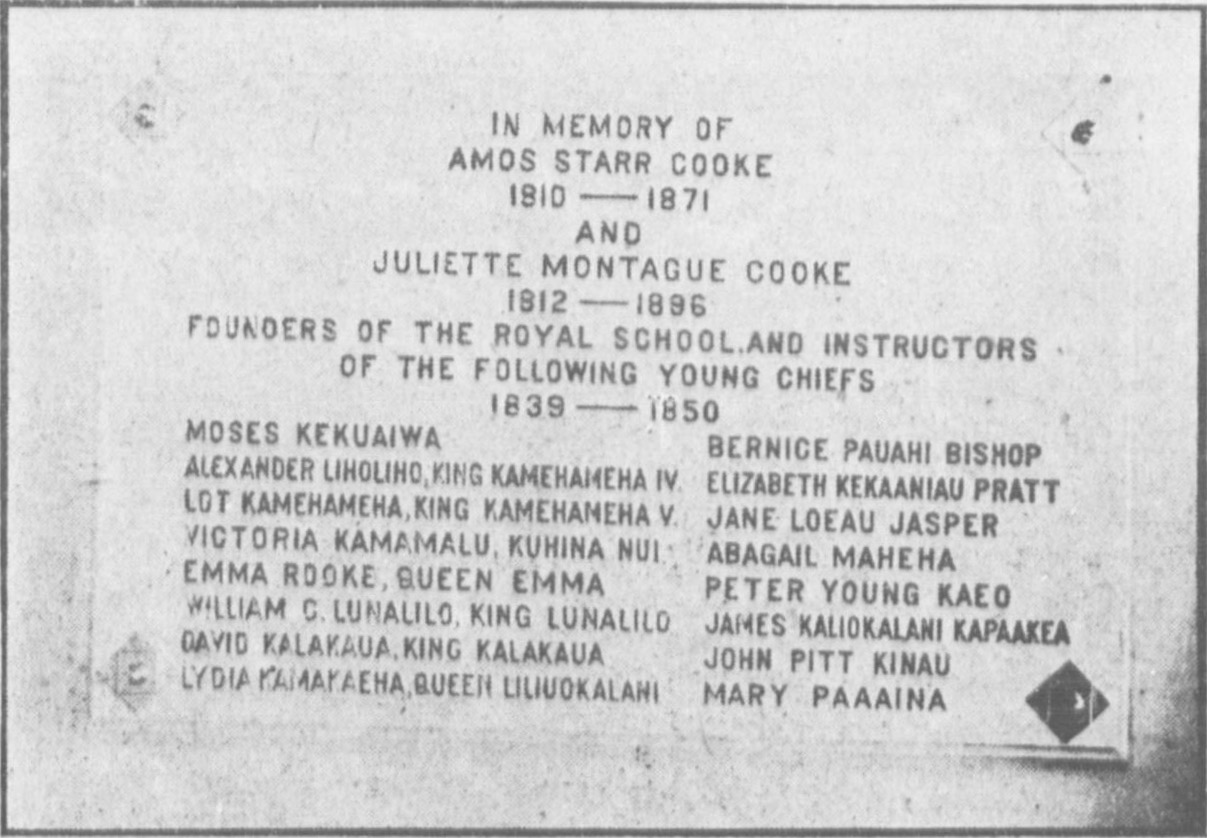
The Cooke Memorial Tablet at Kawaiahaʻo Church commemorating the sixteen royal children and their teachers

Following Moses Kekūāiwa's death, the Cookes continued to express their negative views of him. Amos Cooke warned the graduates Alexander and Lot about the future of the Hawaiian monarchy under them. He emphasized the Cookes' anxiety they not become a "great disappointment" like their elder brother. In a letter to her mother, Juliette Montague Cook wrote:

On Friday last, the 24th inst., we were all called to mourn the loss of Moses Kekuaiwa, once of our family, but expelled some two years since. He has never made himself useful in any way, but on the contrary has confined himself to his vicious practices, and rendered himself disgraceful to our school, to his parents and to the nation. We hope his vicious course and sudden death will be a beacon to his brothers who are about to leave us, to his sister Victoria and to all the remaining members of our family.

Despite the intensive missionary education the royal children received at the Royal School, its long-term political influence proved limited. Kekūāiwa’s surviving brothers, who later became King Kamehameha IV (r. 1855–1863) and King Kamehameha V (r. 1863–1872), gradually distanced themselves from missionary authority and influence. Reflecting on this outcome, missionary advisor Gerrit P. Judd wrote: "The King educated by the Mission, most of all things dislikes the Mission. Having been compelled to be good when a boy, he is determined not to be good as a man."

On March 17, 1912, the Cooke Memorial Tablet was dedicated at Kawaiahaʻo Church, commemorating the sixteen royal children of the original Royal School and their teachers on the 100th anniversary of the birth of Juliette Montague Cooke. The ceremony was officiated by Liliʻuokalani and Elizabeth Kekaʻaniau, the last surviving members of the Royal School. Moses Kekūāiwa's name was placed first among the sixteen students.

== See also ==
- Hawaii – Tahiti relations

== Bibliography ==
- Alexander, William DeWitt (1894). "The "Hale o Keawe" at Honaunau, Hawaii". Journal of the Polynesian Society. 3. London: E. A. Petherick: 159–161. OCLC 6015245150.
- Barrere, Dorothy (1989). "Tahitian in the History of Hawaiʻi: the Journal of Kahikona". The Hawaiian Journal of History. 23. Honolulu: Hawaiian Historical Society: 75–107. hdl:10524/426. OCLC 60626541.
- Bishop, Sereno Edwards (1916). Thurston, Lorrin Andrews (ed.). Reminiscences of Old Hawaii. Honolulu: Hawaiian Gazette Company. OCLC 4267036.
- Brown, Marie Alohalani (December 2014). Facing the Spears of Change: the Life and Legacy of Ioane Kaneiakama Papa ʻĪʻī (Thesis). Honolulu: University of Hawaii at Manoa. hdl:10125/101056.
- Cooke, Amos Starr (1922). Cooke, A. Frank (ed.). "Extracts from Journal of Amos S. Cooke". Thirtieth Annual Report of the Hawaiian Historical Society for the Year 1921. Honolulu: Hawaiian Historical Society: 12–23. hdl:10524/85.
- Cooke, Amos Starr; Cooke, Juliette Montague (1937). Richards, Mary Atherton (ed.). The Chiefs' Children School: A Record Compiled from the Diary and Letters of Amos Starr Cooke and Juliette Montague Cooke, by Their Granddaughter Mary Atherton Richards. Honolulu: Honolulu Star-Bulletin. OCLC 1972890.
- Daws, Gavan (1967). "Decline of Puritanism at Honolulu in the Nineteenth Century". The Hawaiian Journal of History. 1. Hawaiian Historical Society: 31–42. hdl:10524/400.
- Deering, Mabel Clare Craft (1899). "How Royalty Is Buried". Hawaii Nei. San Francisco: W. Doxey. pp. 101–108. OCLC 1620719.
- Dibble, Sheldon (1843). History of the Sandwich Islands. Lahainaluna: Press of the Mission Seminary. OCLC 2145112.
- Forbes, David W., ed. (2000). Hawaiian National Bibliography 1780–1900, Volume 2: 1831–1850. Vol. 2. Honolulu: University of Hawaii Press. ISBN 978-0-8248-2379-5. OCLC 123279964.
- Fornander, Abraham (1880). Stokes, John F. G. (ed.). An Account of the Polynesian Race: Its Origins and Migrations, and the Ancient History of the Hawaiian People to the Times of Kamehameha I. Vol. 2. London: Trubner & Company. OCLC 4823096.
- Gilman, Gorham D. (1970). Sharpless, Jean S.; Greer, Richard A. (eds.). "1848 - Honolulu As It Is - Notes for Amplification". The Hawaiian Journal of History. 4. Honolulu: Hawaiian Historical Society: 105–156. hdl:10524/253. OCLC 60626541.
- Haley, James L. (2014). Captive Paradise: A History of Hawaii. New York: St. Martin's Press. ISBN 978-0-312-60065-5.
- Henry, Teuira; Orsmond, John Muggridge (1928). Ancient Tahiti. Vol. 48. Honolulu: Bernice Pauahi Bishop Museum. p. 254. OCLC 3049679.
- Jarves, James Jackson (1843). History of the Hawaiian Islands. Boston: Tappan and Dennet. OCLC 10163451.
- Judd, Walter (1999). Hawaiʻi Joins the World. Honolulu: Mutual Publishing. ISBN 978-1-56647-227-2. OCLC 154607091.
- Judd, Walter F. (1975). Palaces and Forts of the Hawaiian Kingdom: From Thatch to American Florentine. Palo Alto, CA: Pacific Books, Publishers. ISBN 978-0-87015-216-0. OCLC 2073825.
- Kam, Ralph Thomas (2017). Death Rites and Hawaiian Royalty: Funerary Practices in the Kamehameha and Kalakaua Dynasties, 1819–1953. S. I.: McFarland, Incorporated, Publishers. ISBN 978-1-4766-6846-8. OCLC 966566652.
- Kam, Ralph Thomas (2022). Lost Palaces of Hawaiʻi Royal Residences of the Kingdom Period. S. I.: McFarland, Incorporated, Publishers. ISBN 978-1-4766-8811-4. OCLC 1264273188.
- Kamakau, Samuel (1992) [1961]. Ruling Chiefs of Hawaii (Revised ed.). Honolulu: Kamehameha Schools Press. ISBN 0-87336-014-1. OCLC 25008795.
- Kameʻeleihiwa, Lilikalā (1992). Native Land and Foreign Desires. Honolulu: Bishop Museum Press. pp. 100, 119, 126, 224, 249, Aina of, 125–26, 228, 229, 261, 307, death of, 290, 307, 308, genealogy of, 101.123.231, 246. ISBN 0-930897-59-5. OCLC 154146650.
- Kanahele, George S. (1999). Emma: Hawaii's Remarkable Queen. Honolulu: University of Hawaii Press. ISBN 978-0-8248-2240-8. OCLC 40890919.
- Kanahele, George S. (2002) [1986]. Pauahi: The Kamehameha Legacy. Honolulu: Kamehameha Schools Press. ISBN 978-0-87336-005-0. OCLC 173653971.
- Kaomea, Julie (2014). "Education for Elimination in Nineteenth-Century Hawaiʻi: Settler Colonialism and the Native Hawaiian Chiefs' Children's Boarding School". History of Education Quarterly. 54 (2). New York: History of Education Society: 123–144. doi:10.1111/hoeq.12054. ISSN 0018-2680. OCLC 5571935029. S2CID 143224034.
- Kuykendall, Ralph Simpson (1965) [1938]. The Hawaiian Kingdom 1778–1854, Foundation and Transformation. Vol. 1. Honolulu: University of Hawaii Press. ISBN 0-87022-431-X. OCLC 47008868.
- Liliuokalani (1898). Hawaii's Story by Hawaii's Queen, Liliuokalani. Boston: Lee and Shepard. ISBN 978-0-548-22265-2. OCLC 2387226.
- Menton, Linda K. (1981). "The Royal School 1839–1850". Educational Perspectives. The Journal of the University of Hawaii at Mānoa. 20 (3). Honolulu: University of Hawaii: 17–21. hdl:10125/47174. ISSN 0013-1849. OCLC 220851876.
- Parker, David "Kawika" (2008). "Crypts of the Ali`i The Last Refuge of the Hawaiian Royalty". Tales of Our Hawaiʻi (PDF). Honolulu: Alu Like, Inc. OCLC 309392477. Archived from the original (PDF) on November 11, 2013.
- Pratt, Elizabeth Kekaaniauokalani Kalaninuiohilaukapu (1920). History of Keoua Kalanikupuapa-i-nui: Father of Hawaii Kings, and His Descendants, with Notes on Kamehameha I, First King of All Hawaii. Honolulu: Honolulu Star-Bulletin. OCLC 154181545.
- Reynolds, Stephen (1989). Joerger, Pauline King (ed.). Journal of Stephen Reynolds: 1823–1829. Honolulu: Ku Paʻa Incorporated. ISBN 978-0-914916-80-2. OCLC 20465590.
- Schmitt, Robert C.; Nordyke, Eleanor C. (2001). "Death in Hawai'i: The Epidemics of 1848–1849". Hawaiian Journal of History. 35. Honolulu: Hawaiian Historical Society: 1–13. hdl:10524/339. OCLC 60626541.
- Taylor, A. P. (1929). Ford, Alexander Hume (ed.). "Niniko, 'Garden of Rest'". The Mid-Pacific Magazine. 37 (5). T. H., A. H. Ford; Pan-Pacific Union, Pan-Pacific Research Institution: 433–440.
- Taylor, Albert Pierce (1922). Under Hawaiian Skies: A Narrative of the Romance, Adventure and History of the Hawaiian Islands. Honolulu: Advertiser Publishing Company, Ltd. OCLC 479709.
- Van Dyke, Jon M. (2008). Who Owns the Crown Lands of Hawaiʻi?. Honolulu: University of Hawaii Press. ISBN 978-0-8248-6560-3. OCLC 257449971 – via Project MUSE.
- Vowell, Sarah (2011). Unfamiliar Fishes. New York: Riverhead Books. ISBN 978-1-101-48645-0. OCLC 646111859.
- Wyllie, Robert Crichton (1845). Simmonds, P. L. (ed.). "Notes on the Sandwich, Or Hawaiian Islands". Simmond's Colonial Magazine and Foreign Miscellany. London: Simmonds and Ward: 125–139. OCLC 405778069.
