= Papeari =

Pape'ari
- Associated commune of Teva I Uta
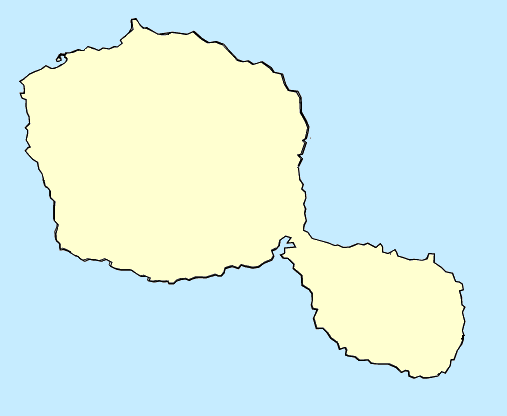
- Location within Tahiti
- Location of Pape'ari
- Coordinates: 17°45′S 149°21′W
- Country: France
- Overseas collectivity: French Polynesia
- Commune: Teva I Uta
- Population (2022): 5,446
- Time zone: UTC−10:00

Pape'ari is a village on the south coast of Tahiti. It is located in Tahiti-nui district, around 32 miles from Papeete.

== History ==
Papeari is attested in some accounts as Tahiti's oldest village.

Some 19th-century sources attest that Papeari was formerly known as Vaiari (or Wyere), a name attributed to an indigenous group. It houses a harbor with anchorage.

Tourist sites in and near modern Papeari include the former home of the British novelist Robert Keable, who lived there from 1922 until his death in 1927, and a museum dedicated to the French painter Paul Gauguin, also a former resident of the area (from 1891-3).

== Notable people ==
- Ralph Taaviri (1954-2023) - trade unionist and environmental activist
