= Ninito Sumner =

Polynesian princess

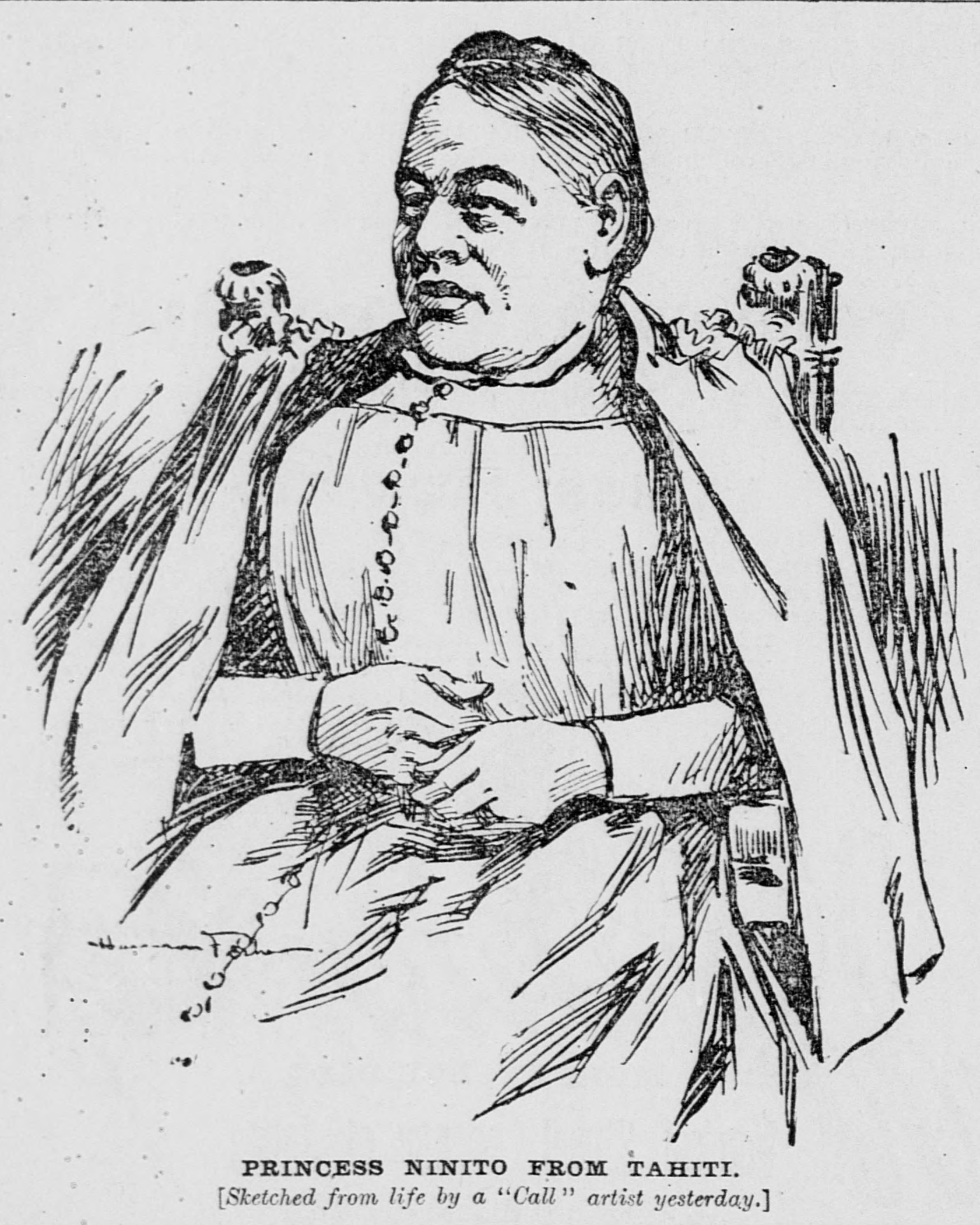
- Newspaper illustration of Ninito Sumner in 1895
- Born: c. 1821 or 1838; Tahiti
- Died: July 20, 1898; Honolulu, Oahu, Republic of Hawaii
- Burial: Honolulu Catholic Cemetery
- Spouse: John Kapilikea Sumner
Names
- Eugénie Ninito Teraʻiapo Sumner
- House: Teva clan
- Father: Tupu a Ta'aroa
- Mother: Marama

Eugénie Ninito Teraʻiapo Sumner (c. 1821–1898), also known as Niniko, was a princess from the Kingdom of Tahiti who settled in the Kingdom of Hawaii.

== Life ==
Ninito was born in 1821 or 1838. Sources disagree on her birth year. Tahitian traditions recorded by her niece Queen Marau gave a birth year of 1821, while later accounts by historian Alfons Korn suggested 1838. Ninito was the second daughter of Tupu a Taʻaroa, son of Tati, ruling chief or Ari‘irahi of Paparā and leader of the Teva clan, and Marama Arii Manihinihi of Moʻorea. She and her elder sister Ariʻitaimai were adopted into the Pōmare dynasty: Ariʻitaimai by Queen Mother Teriʻitoʻoterai Teremoemoe and Ninito by Queen Regent Teriitaria II. Through these chiefly adoptions, the sisters became members of the immediate family circle of King Pōmare III and Queen Pōmare IV. Had she remained in Tahiti, Ninito would have been the chiefess of Papeari on the southwestern coast of Tahiti. Her name Teraʻiapo means "sky of the night", and Ninito has been translated as "encircle" in the Tahitian language.

According to Hawaiian tradition, Ninito traveled to Hawaiʻi in 1848 to marry Prince Moses Kekūāiwa, the nephew of King Kamehameha III and elder brother of the future Kings Kamehameha IV and Kamehameha V. This union would have been one of several proposed marriage alliances between the royal houses of Hawaiʻi and Tahiti. However, by the time she arrived in Hawaiʻi in January 1849, the prince had died during the measles epidemic on November 24, 1848. Later accounts by historian Albert Pierce Taylor instead placed Ninito's arrival in August 1849 among the entourage of French Admiral Louis Tromelin, who would later carry out the French invasion of Honolulu in response to the persecution of Catholics in Hawaii. Historian Dorothy Barrere, however, found no evidence that Ninito accompanied Tromelin and suggested that she more likely arrived aboard the French schooners Sophia or Ann, having departed Tahiti before news of Kekūāiwa's death had reached the islands.

Later tradition held that Admiral de Tromelin offered Ninito passage back to Tahiti following the death of Prince Kekūāiwa, but she instead chose to remain in Hawaiʻi with her companions. A marriage between Ninito and Prince Lot, the future Kamehameha V, was suggested but never materialized. Instead, Ninito married the hapa-haole (part Caucasian) Hawaiian chief John Kapilikea Sumner in Honolulu on May 28, 1850. Sumner was a prominent Honolulu landowner and vessel owner whose waterfront residence, known as the "house on the reef", became a center of social life in Honolulu during the 1860s and 1870s. The couple did not have any children. They adopted her husband's niece Nancy Sumner in the Hawaiian tradition of hānai.

Ninito died at her residence on Beretania Street in Honolulu on July 20, 1898, at approximately sixty years of age. Her funeral was held the following day at the Cathedral Basilica of Our Lady of Peace in Honolulu and was conducted according to Hawaiian royal burial customs, with kahili bearers and attendants carrying yellow feather standards associated with Hawaiian royalty. Princess Kaʻiulani, her father Archibald Scott Cleghorn and Prince David Kawānanakoa attended the service, while Queen Dowager Kapiʻolani was represented in absentia. She was buried at the Honolulu Catholic Cemetery.

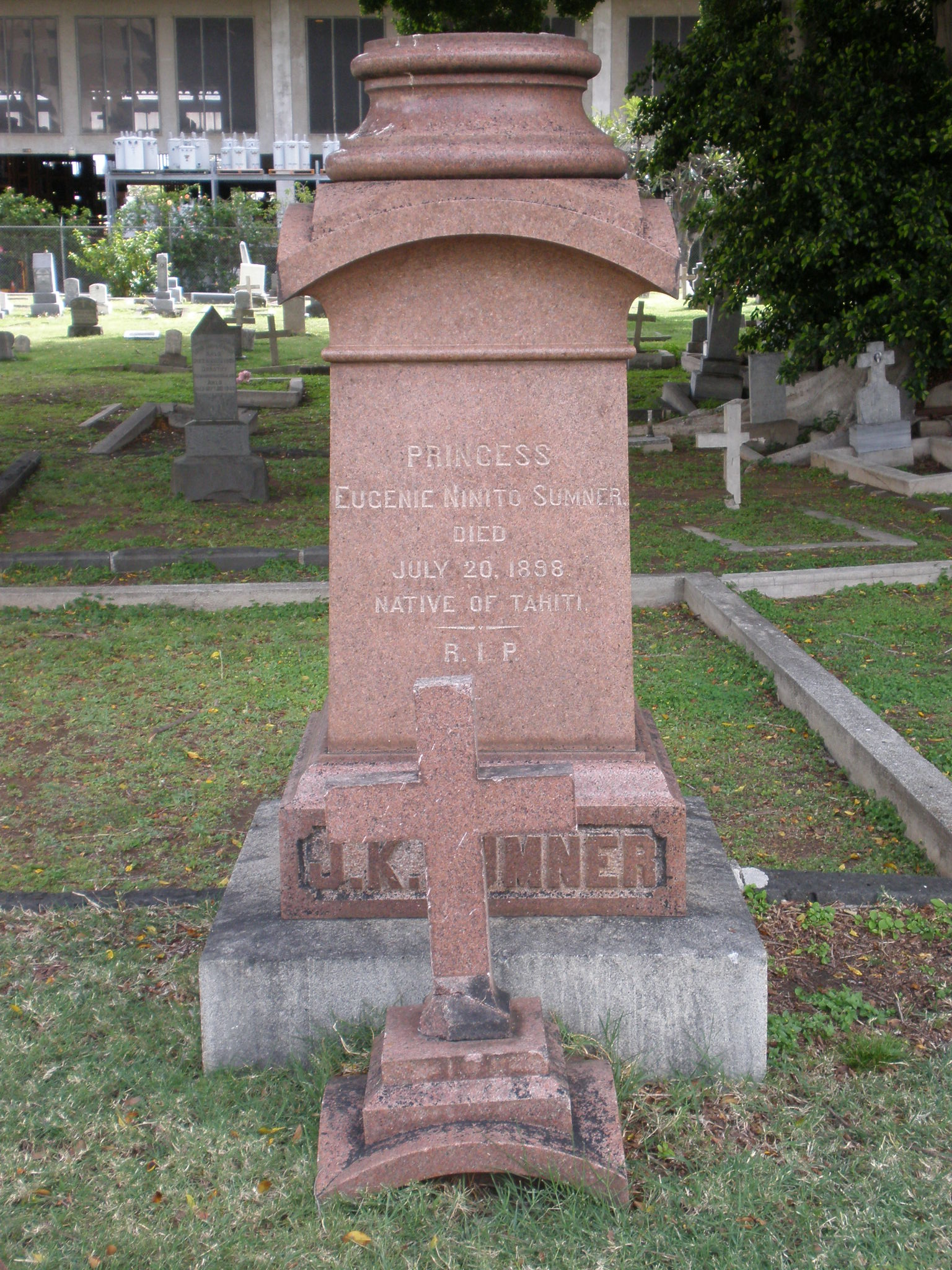
Tombstone at the Honolulu Catholic Cemetery

== Bibliography ==
- Adams, Henry (1901). Tahiti: Memoirs of Arii Taimai. Ridgewood, NJ: The Gregg Press. OCLC 21482.
- Allen, Helena G. (1982). The Betrayal of Liliuokalani: Last Queen of Hawaii, 1838–1917. Glendale, California: Arthur H. Clark Company. ISBN 978-0-87062-144-4. OCLC 9576325. Archived from the original on January 13, 2018.
- Barrere, Dorothy (1989). "Tahitian in the History of Hawaiʻi: the Journal of Kahikona". The Hawaiian Journal of History. 23. Honolulu: Hawaiian Historical Society: 75–107. hdl:10524/426. OCLC 60626541.
- Deering, Mabel Clare Craft (1899). "How Royalty Is Buried". Hawaii Nei. San Francisco: W. Doxey. pp. 101–108. OCLC 1620719.
- Henry, Teuira; Orsmond, John Muggridge (1928). Ancient Tahiti. Vol. 48. Honolulu: Bernice Pauahi Bishop Museum. p. 254. OCLC 3049679.
- Kaeo, Peter; Queen Emma (1976). Korn, Alfons L. (ed.). News from Molokai, Letters Between Peter Kaeo & Queen Emma, 1873–1876. Honolulu: The University Press of Hawaii. hdl:10125/39980. ISBN 978-0-8248-0399-5. OCLC 2225064.
- Taylor, A. P. (1929). Ford, Alexander Hume (ed.). "Niniko, 'Garden of Rest'". The Mid-Pacific Magazine. 37 (5). T. H., A. H. Ford; Pan-Pacific Union, Pan-Pacific Research Institution: 433–440.
