= Ralph Taaviri =

French Polynesian activist (1954–2023)

Ralph Taaviri (14 October 1954 – 29 April 2023) was a French Polynesian trade unionist, independence activist and environmentalist. He was an activist in the Tāvini Huiraʻatira party and a co-founder of environmental NGO Faatura te rahu a te Atua.

Taaviri was from Papeari.

In 1995, following the resumption of nuclear testing by French colonial authorities, he was one of a number of trade unionists abducted and tortured by French police.

He died after falling while hunting in the Punaruu valley in April 2023.
