= Tavana Salmon =

French Polynesian culture advocate (1920–2024)

- Born: 13 January 1920; Papeete, French Polynesia, France
- Died: 24 September 2024 (aged 104)
- Occupations: Culture advocate Tattoo artist

Tavana Salmon (13 January 1920 – 24 September 2024) was a French Polynesian culture advocate and tattoo artist. In 1982, he began his contributions to Polynesian culture through his tattoo practice.

== Biography ==
Born on 13 January 1920 in Papeete, Salmon had a Tahitian mother and American father. He moved to Hawaii at the age of three and attended school there and performed shows in Waikiki for 17 years. He also appeared in a film, The Bounty, which was about the mutiny on the Bounty. In 1982, he returned to Polynesia to begin his tattoo practice. That year, over 100 people were tattooed, with 150 the following year. At the start of the revival, there were very few people on Tahiti who had the traditional tattoos. He personally tattooed ten people a day for ten years straight. He made appearances in the documentary films Tatau, le renouveau du tatouage (2007) and Tatau, la culture d'un art (2015).

Salmon died on 24 September 2024, at the age of 104.
