= Pan-Pacific Union =

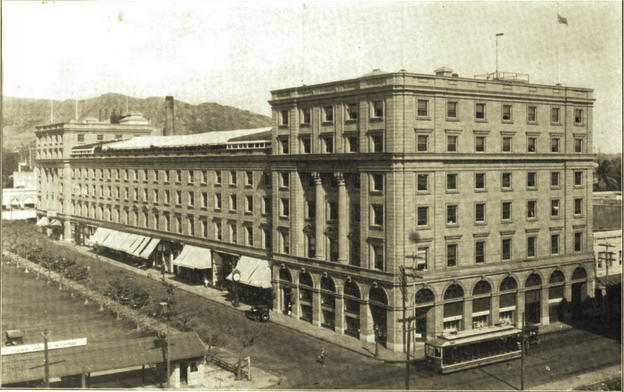
Pan-Pacific Union occupied the 2nd floor of the Alexander Young Building (1925).png

Pan-Pacific Union (acronym PPU; alternate name Union Panpacifique; est. 1912) was an American organization founded in 1912 (Note: According to Davidann (2008), the PPU was established in 1917.) in Honolulu, Hawaii by Alexander Hume Ford. It was directed by men of every nation about the Pacific Ocean for the purpose of bringing the countries into close and more friendly relationship and understanding. A part of the Samuel Northrup Castle property in the Mānoa Valley became the headquarters of the Pan-Pacific Union.

Member states included Australia, Canada, Chile, China, Colombia, Hawaii, India, Japan, Java, New Zealand, Philippines, Siam and the Pan-American Union. The organization was governed by the International Board of Trustees. It relied on contributions from private individuals and from Governments of Pacific countries. The First Conference (First Pan-Pacific Scientific Conference) was held at Honolulu in 1920; the second (First Pan-Pacific Educational Conference) at Honolulu in 1921; the third (First Pan-Pacific Press Conference) at Honolulu in 1921; the fourth (First Pan-Pacific Commercial Conference) at Honolulu, 1922; the second Scientific Conference was held at Melbourne and Sydney (Australia) in 1923; and the First Pan-Pacific Conference for the Conservation of Sources of Food Supply was held at Honolulu in 1924.

== Establishment ==
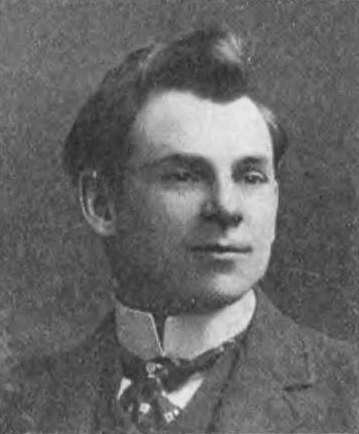
Alexander Hume Ford

Alexander Hume Ford came to Hawaii to live in about 1907. At the Outrigger Club he gave a series of dinners to the leading men of each Pacific country to meet Jack London and discuss with him the great international problems of the Pacific. This led to the idea of the "Hands-Around-the-Pacific Club" and the movement was the beginning of the Pan-Pacific union.

About 1908, Ford made a trip around the Pacific with a commission from then Governor Walter F. Frear to begin the organizing of the PPU. T. E. Dunne of New Zealand and Percy Hunter of Australia took the leadership in their countries and branches of the Union were established with government backing. A conference was held in Honolulu and the governments of the Pacific selected that place as the conference centre of the Pacific because of its convenient location as a crossroads station, so Ford decided to make his home there.

A gathering of delegates from different Pacific countries met in Hawaii in 1909 after a call by the then governor, Walter F. Frear. About this time. the Bureau of American Republics was being organized into the Pan-American Union (now Organization of American States) at Washington, D.C.

In 1914, Ford again made a trip around the Pacific organizing branches of the union in the Orient.

In 1920, Ford persuaded a party of congressmen to visit the Orient and establish points of contact with the leading men in the Philippines, China and Japan and here was established a series of branch organizations of the PPU with the heads of these governments as honorary presidents.

The first conference after World War I was the Pan-Pacific scientific conference in 1920, when about a hundred scientists from Pacific lands met and organized to discuss the scientific problems of the Pacific. In 1921, Ford had the PPU call the first Pan-Pacific educational conference, which was a success under the chairmanship of David Starr Jordan.

== Organization ==
As the years passed, not only the premiers of Australia and New Zealand, but also the heads of other Pacific governments began to take an interest in the work of the Pan-Pacific Union. Franklin K. Lane was sent by President Woodrow Wilson to visit Hawaii in 1917, when the Pan-Pacific Union was formally organized and received its charter from the Territory of Hawaii as an international organization. On the day that Territorial Governor Charles J. McCarthy was inaugurated as the chief executive of Hawaii, he became the first president of the Pan-Pacific Union, with Franklin K. Lane as vice-president and Woodrow Wilson elected as honorary president. Several thousand men and women of all Pacific races took part in the inaugural and presented Mr. Lane with flags of every Pacific country to be taken to the president of the United States, with the request that he serve as the first honorary President of the Pan-Pacific Union. Secretary of the Interior Lane presented these flags to Mr. Wilson at a cabinet meeting, and Mr. Wilson accepted the honorary presidency of the Pan-Pacific Union, remaining its staunch friend and supporter. It was the motion film of this Pan-Pacific inaugural ceremony in Hawaii that was the first bit of entertainment Mr. Wilson asked for in his sick chamber.

Other heads of Pacific governments not only accepted honorary presidencies of the Pan-Pacific Union, but gave pledges of their own cooperation and that of their countries. When the Legislature of Hawaii appropriated US$10,000 for the calling of the Pan-Pacific Commercial and Educational Congress, of which the Pan-Pacific Scientific Conference was a section, a rider was attached that the money would be available only when three other Pacific countries had made appropriations. The premiers of Australia and New Zealand immediately cabled that their governments were making appropriations to the Pan-Pacific Union, and in Washington, Senator Henry Cabot Lodge, Chairman of the Foreign Relations Committee, and Stephen G. Porter of the Foreign Affairs Committee of the House, pledged that the United States would also make appropriation, which it did for the amount asked, US$9,000.

Later on, when the president of China accepted the honorary presidency in the Pan-Pacific Union, he sent his check for US$1,000 as an evidence of China's intention to cooperate. One after another, the succeeding prime ministers of Canada accepted office with the PPU and gave their moral support. Prime Minister Hara of Japan accepted honorary presidency for his country, and in Tokyo, the Pan-Pacific Association numbered hundreds of members, including nearly all of the members of the House of Peers and of the Diet. Prince I. Tokugawa, the second man in the empire, was president of the association in Japan.

In China, the movement grew with startling rapidity. The Shanghai Pan-Pacific Association had thousands of members and launched a good roads campaign that was sweeping over China.

In Washington, D.C., the Pan-American Union acted as the big brother to the Pan-Pacific Union, giving it office room in the Pan American Union Building built by Andrew Carnegie as its home, and aiding the Pan-Pacific Union in securing appropriations, the two organizations coming side by side in the consular appropriations bills. John Barrett, for a decade, Director General of the Pan-American Union, was an honorary vice president of the Pan-Pacific Union and a loyal worker for its cause. He was succeeded by Dr. Leo Stanton Rowe, who was an equal enthusiast for the Pan-Pacific Union. The Pan-American Union did everything in its power to have the Pacific coast Latin-American states send delegates to the Pan-Pacific Educational Conference in August.

Honolulu was selected by the delegates from the Pacific countries on account of its central position as the headquarters of the Pan-Pacific Union. Every year, the Pan-Pacific Union approached nearer to its position as the official body of the governments of the Pacific, but it was the desire of the premiers and presidents of Pacific lands that the conferences be called semi-officially at first and gradually pave the way for the governments of the Pacific to officially take over the Pan-Pacific Union, not perhaps just as the Pan-American Union was taken over by the Republics of North and South America, for in the Pan-Pacific Union, the U.S. dominated. In the Pan-Pacific Union, all countries were equal, in honor preferring one another and uniting only in those efforts which all could agree were for the benefit and advancement of the whole Pacific.

In bringing all peoples of the Pacific together in cooperation, the Pan-Pacific Union conducted a series of conferences of the leading men of Pacific nations in science, education, commerce, art, literature, medicine, law and welfare work. After meeting, these leaders learned to work together, and returned to their homes with an acquaintance that extended entirely around the Pacific. They acted as leaders, each in his native land, and at the next conference, brought back assurances of increased desire for cooperation and coordination. Thus the nations began to have common causes of interest to work out and the binding together progressed.

== Aims and objects ==
According to the organization's charter, the aims and objects were:

1. To call in conference delegates from all Pacific peoples for the purpose of discussing and furthering the interests common to Pacific nations.
2. To maintain in Hawaii and other Pacific lands bureaus of information and education concerning matters of interest to the people of the Pacific, and to disseminate to the world information of every kind of progress and opportunity in Pacific lands, and to promote the comfort and interests of all visitors.
3. To aid and assist those in all Pacific communities to better understand each other, and to work together for the furtherance of the best interests of the land of their adoption, and, through them, to spread abroad about the Pacific the friendly spirit of interracial cooperation.
4. To assist and to aid all the different races in lands of the Pacific to cooperate in local affairs, to raise produce, and to create home manufactured goods.
5. To own real estate, erect buildings needed for housing exhibits; provided and maintained by the respective local committees.
6. To maintain a Pan-Pacific Commercial museum and art gallery.
7. To create dioramas, gather exhibits, books and other Pan-Pacific material of educational or instructive value.
8. To promote and conduct a Pan-Pacific exposition of the handicrafts of the Pacific peoples, of their works of art, and scenic dioramas of the most beautiful bits of Pacific lands, or illustrating great Pacific industries.
9. To establish and maintain a permanent college and "clearing house" of information (printed and otherwise) concerning the lands, commerce, peoples and trade opportunities in countries of the Pacific, creating libraries of commercial knowledge, and training men in this commercial knowledge of Pacific lands.
10. To secure the cooperation and support of federal and state governments, chambers of commerce, city governments and of individuals.
11. To enlist for this work of publicity in behalf of Alaska, the Territory of Hawaii, and the Philippines, federal aid and financial support, as well as similar support from all Pacific governments.
12. To bring all nations and peoples about the Pacific Ocean into closer friendly and commercial contact and relationship.
