= List of flag bearers for the Cook Islands at the Olympics =

Cook Islands at the Olympics
- Flag of the Cook Islands
- IOC code: COK
- NOC: Cook Islands Sports and National Olympic Committee
- Website: www.oceaniasport.com/cookis
- Medals: Gold 0 Silver 0 Bronze 0 Total 0

Summer appearances
- 1988; 1992; 1996; 2000; 2004; 2008; 2012; 2016; 2020; 2024

This is a list of flag bearers who have represented the Cook Islands at the Olympics.

Flag bearers carry the national flag of their country at the opening ceremony of the Olympic Games.

| # | Event year | Season | Flag bearer | Sex | Sport | Ref. |
|---|---|---|---|---|---|---|
| 1 | 1988 | Summer | William Taramai | M | Athletics | |
| 2 | 1992 | Summer | Sam Nunuke Pera | M | Weightlifting | |
| 3 | 1996 | Summer | Sam Nunuke Pera | M | Weightlifting | |
| 4 | 2000 | Summer | Turia Vogel | M | Sailing | |
| 5 | 2004 | Summer | Sam Nunuke Pera | M | Weightlifting | |
| 6 | 2008 | Summer | Sam Pera | M | Weightlifting | |
| 7 | 2012 | Summer | Helema Williams | F | Sailing | |
| 8 | 2016 | Summer | Ella Nicholas | F | Canoeing | |
| 9 | 2020 | Summer | Kirsten Fisher-Marsters | F | Swimming | |
| 9 | 2020 | Summer | Wesley Roberts | M | Swimming | |
| 10 | 2024 | Summer | Alex Beddoes | M | Athletics | |
| 10 | 2024 | Summer | Lanihei Connolly | F | Swimming | |

== See also ==
- Cook Islands at the Olympics
