= Cook Islands at the 2025 World Aquatics Championships =

- Flag of Cook Islands
- World Aquatics code: COK
- National federation: Cook Islands Aquatics Federation
- Website: cookislandsaquatics.com

in Singapore
- Competitors: 3 in 1 sport
- Medals: Gold 0 Silver 0 Bronze 0 Total 0

World Aquatics Championships appearances
- 2007; 2009; 2011; 2013; 2015; 2017; 2019; 2022; 2023; 2024; 2025

Cook Islands is competing at the 2025 World Aquatics Championships in Singapore from 11 July to 3 August 2025.

== Competitors ==
The following is the list of competitors in the Championships.

Sport	Men	Women	Total
Swimming	1	2	3
Total	1	2	3

== Swimming ==
Men

Athlete	Event	Heat		Semifinal		Final	
Athlete	Event	Time	Rank	Time	Rank	Time	Rank
Jacob Story	100 m breaststroke	1:02.93	47	Did not advance			
Jacob Story	200 m breaststroke	2:17.91	33	Did not advance			

Women

Athlete	Event	Heat		Semifinal		Final	
Athlete	Event	Time	Rank	Time	Rank	Time	Rank
Lanihei Connolly	100 m breaststroke	1:07.40	26	Did not advance			
Lanihei Connolly	200 m breaststroke	2:29.87	26	Did not advance			
Mia Laban	100 m freestyle	59.95	51	Did not advance			
Mia Laban	100 m butterfly	1:05.41	49	Did not advance			
