= Cook Islands at the 2020 Summer Olympics =

- Flag of the Cook Islands
- IOC code: COK
- NOC: Cook Islands Sports and National Olympic Committee
- Website: www.oceaniasport.com/cookis

in Tokyo, Japan July 23, 2021 – August 8, 2021
- Competitors: 6 in 3 sports
- Flag bearers (opening): Wesley Roberts; Kirsten Fisher-Marsters
- Flag bearer (closing): N/A
- Officials: John Paul Wilson (Chef de Mission)
- Medals: Gold 0 Silver 0 Bronze 0 Total 0

Summer Olympics appearances (overview)
- 1988; 1992; 1996; 2000; 2004; 2008; 2012; 2016; 2020; 2024

The Cook Islands competed at the 2020 Summer Olympics in Tokyo. Originally scheduled to take place from 24 July to 9 August 2020, the Games were postponed to 23 July to 8 August 2021, because of the COVID-19 pandemic. It was the nation's ninth consecutive appearance at the Summer Olympics. The Cook Islands sent their first delegation to the Olympics at the 1988 Summer Olympics in Seoul, South Korea. In the Games, the country sent six athletes to the Olympics across three sports. They were Alex Beddoes in athletics, Jane Nicholas, Kohl Horton, and Jade Tierney in canoeing, and Wesley Roberts and Kirsten Fisher-Marsters in swimming. Roberts and Fisher-Marsters were the flagbearers at the opening ceremony, and there were no flagbearers at the closing ceremony. The Cook Islands did not win any medals during the Tokyo Olympics.

== Background ==
In 1986, the Cook Islands Sports and National Olympic Committee was recognised by the International Olympic Committee (IOC). The Cook Islands sent their first delegation to the 1988 Summer Olympics in Seoul. Since then, the country has sent delegations to all Summer Olympics. As of the 2024 Games, no Cook Islander has won an Olympic medal.

The 2020 Summer Olympics were held from 23 July to 8 August 2021 in Tokyo. The Cook Islands sent a delegation of six athletes across three sports, Alex Beddoes, Jane Nicholas, Kohl Horton, Jade Tierney, Wesley Roberts, and Kirsten Fisher-Marsters. Roberts and Fisher-Marsters were the flagbearers at the opening ceremony. No athletes from the Cook Islands were present for the closing ceremony due to COVID-19 related protocols that required athletes to leave Japan within 48 hours from completion of their final event.

== Competitors ==
The following is the list of number of competitors in the Games.

Sport	Men	Women	Total
Athletics	1	0	1
Canoeing	1	2	3
Swimming	1	1	2
Total	3	3	6

== Athletics ==
The Cook Islands received a universality slot from the IAAF to send a male track and field athlete to the Olympics. The Cook Islands were represented by one male athlete at the 2020 Summer Olympics in athletics: Alex Beddoes in the men's 800 metres run. Beddoes was making his second Olympic appearance, having previously represented the Cook Islands at the 2016 Summer Olympics. On 31 July, he participated in the first round of the men's 800 metres race, and was drawn into heat two. He finished the race in 1:47.26 seconds, seventh out of eight competitors in his heat, and failed to advance to the semi-finals. The gold medal was eventually won in 1:45.33 by Emmanuel Korir of Kenya; the silver was won by Ferguson Rotich of Kenya, and the bronze was earned by Patryk Dobek of Poland.

Key

- Note–Ranks given for track events are within the athlete's heat only
- NR = National record
- Q = Qualified

Track & road events

Athlete	Event	Heats		Semifinal		Final	
Athlete	Event	Result	Rank	Result	Rank	Result	Rank
Alex Beddoes	Men's 800 m	1:47.26 NR	7	Did not advance			

== Canoeing ==
=== Slalom ===
The Cook Islands qualified one canoeist in the women's K-1 class, Jane Nicholas, by finishing as the 16th ranked eligible NOC at the 2019 ICF Canoe Slalom World Championships in La Seu d'Urgell, Spain.

Athlete	Event	Preliminary						Semifinal		Final	
Athlete	Event	Run 1	Rank	Run 2	Rank	Best	Rank	Time	Rank	Time	Rank
Jane Nicholas	Women's C-1	151.95	19	205.74	22	151.95	21	Did not advance			
Jane Nicholas	Women's K-1	150.17	23	120.10	20	120.10	21 Q	144.84	22	Did not advance	

=== Sprint ===
Canoeists from the Cook Islands qualified two boats in each of the following distances for the Games through the 2020 Oceania Championships in Penrith, New South Wales.

Athlete	Event	Heats		Quarterfinals		Semifinals		Final	
Athlete	Event	Time	Rank	Time	Rank	Time	Rank	Time	Rank
Kohl Horton	Men's K-1 200 m	40.061	4 QF	DNF		Did not advance			
Kohl Horton	Men's K-1 1000 m	4:24.679	6 QF	4:39.138	6	Did not advance			
Jade Tierney	Women's K-1 200 m	48.271	6 QF	49.290	8	Did not advance			

Qualification Legend: FA = Qualify to final A (medal); FB = Qualify to final B (non-medal)

== Swimming ==
Cook Islands qualified two swimmers in three events.

Athlete	Event	Heat		Semifinal		Final	
Athlete	Event	Time	Rank	Time	Rank	Time	Rank
Wesley Roberts	Men's 200 m freestyle	1:50.41	37	Did not advance			
Wesley Roberts	Men's 400 m freestyle	3:55.65	30	—N/a		Did not advance	
Kirsten Fisher-Marsters	Women's 100 m breaststroke	1:13.98	36	Did not advance			
