= Cook Islands at the World Athletics Championships =

- WA code: COK
- National federation: Athletics Cook Islands
- Medals: Gold 0 Silver 0 Bronze 0 Total 0

World Athletics Championships appearances (overview)
- 1983; 1987; 1991; 1993; 1995; 1997; 1999; 2001; 2003; 2005; 2007; 2009; 2011; 2013; 2015; 2017; 2019; 2022; 2023; 2025

The Cook Islands has competed at the World Athletics Championships on fifteen occasions, and did not send a delegation for the 1999 World Championships in Athletics. Its competing country code is COK. The country has not won any medals at the competition and as of 2017 no Cook Islands athlete has progressed beyond the first round of an event. Its best performance is by Tereapii Tapoki, who placed twentieth in women's discus throw qualifying in 2005.

== 2019 ==
Cook Islands competed at the 2019 World Athletics Championships in Doha, Qatar, from 27 September 2019.

Athlete	Event	Preliminary		Heat		Semifinal		Final	
Athlete	Event	Result	Rank	Result	Rank	Result	Rank	Result	Rank
Tikove Piira	100 metres	11.81	27	Did not advance					
