= Cook Islands at the 2023 World Athletics Championships =

- Flag of the Cook Islands
- WA code: COK

in Budapest, Hungary 19 August 2023 – 27 August 2023
- Competitors: 1 (1 man and 0 women)
- Medals: Gold 0 Silver 0 Bronze 0 Total 0

World Athletics Championships appearances (overview)
- 1983; 1987; 1991; 1993; 1995; 1997; 1999; 2001; 2003; 2005; 2007; 2009; 2011; 2013; 2015; 2017; 2019; 2022; 2023; 2025

The Cook Islands competed at the 2023 World Athletics Championships in Budapest, Hungary, which were held from 19 to 27 August 2023. The athlete delegation of the country was composed of one competitor, middle-distance runner Alex Beddoes who competed in the men's 800 metres. He qualified for the Championships upon being selected by the Athletics Cook Islands. In his event, Beddoes placed eighth in his preliminary and failed to advance further.

== Background ==
The 2023 World Athletics Championships in Budapest, Hungary, were held from 19 to 27 August 2023. The Championships were held at the National Athletics Centre. To qualify for the World Championships, athletes had to reach an entry standard (e.g. time or distance), place in a specific position at select competitions, be a wild card entry, or qualify through their World Athletics Ranking at the end of the qualification period.

As the Cook Islands did not meet any of the four standards, they could send either one male or one female athlete in one event of the Championships who has not yet qualified. The Athletics Cook Islands selected middle-distance runner Alex Beddoes who competed in the men's 800 metres. At the time of his selection, he had a personal best of 1:47.26, the national record, and was ranked 286 in the world. Previously, Beddoes had competed for the Cook Islands at the 2016 Summer Olympics and 2020 Summer Olympics.

== Results ==
Key

- Q = Qualified for the next round
- q = Qualified for the next round as a fastest loser or, in field events, by position without achieving the qualifying target
- NR = National record
- PB = Personal best
- SB = Season best
- N/A = Round not applicable for the event

=== Men ===
Beddoes competed in the sixth preliminary heat on 22 August against eight other athletes. There, he recorded a time of 1:48.31 and placed eighth, failing to advance further as only the top three of each heat and the three next fastest would be able to do so.

Track and road events

Athlete	Event	Heat		Semifinal		Final	
Athlete	Event	Result	Rank	Result	Rank	Result	Rank
Alex Beddoes	800 metres	1:48.31	8	Did not advance			
