= Cook Islands at the 1996 Summer Olympics =

- Flag of the Cook Islands
- IOC code: COK
- NOC: Cook Islands Sports & Olympic Association
- Website: www.oceaniasport.com/cookis

in Atlanta
- Competitors: 3 (2 men and 1 woman) in 3 sports
- Flag bearer: Sam Nunuku Pera
- Medals: Gold 0 Silver 0 Bronze 0 Total 0

Summer Olympics appearances (overview)
- 1988; 1992; 1996; 2000; 2004; 2008; 2012; 2016; 2020; 2024

The Cook Islands competed in three events at the 1996 Summer Olympics in Atlanta, United States.

== Athletics ==
Men

Athlete	Event	Heat		Quarterfinal		Semifinal		Final	
Athlete	Event	Result	Rank	Result	Rank	Result	Rank	Result	Rank
Mark Sherwin	100 m	11.41	9	did not advance					

Key

- Note–Ranks given for track events are within the athlete's heat only
- Q = Qualified for the next round
- q = Qualified for the next round as a fastest loser or, in field events, by position without achieving the qualifying target
- NR = National record
- N/A = Round not applicable for the event
- Bye = Athlete not required to compete in round

== Sailing ==
Women's Mistral Rank	Helmsman (Country)	Race I		Race II		Race III		Race IV		Race V		Race VI		Race VII		Race VIII		Race IX		Total Points	Total -1
Women's Mistral Rank	Helmsman (Country)	Rank	Points	Rank	Points	Rank	Points	Rank	Points	Rank	Points	Rank	Points	Rank	Points	Rank	Points	Rank	Points	Total Points	Total -1
22	Turia Vogel (COK)	24	24.0	~~26~~	~~26.0~~	21	21.0	~~27~~	~~27.0~~	24	24.0	19	19.0	19	19.0	22	22.0	17	17.0	199.0	146.0

== Weightlifting ==
Men

Athlete	Event	Snatch		Clean & jerk		Total	Rank
Athlete	Event	Result	Rank	Result	Rank	Total	Rank
Sam Nunuke Pera	99 kg	120 kg	26	165 kg	23	285 kg	24
