= Cook Islands at the 2016 Summer Olympics =

- Flag of the Cook Islands
- IOC code: COK
- NOC: Cook Islands Sports and National Olympic Committee
- Website: www.oceaniasport.com/cookis

in Rio de Janeiro
- Competitors: 9 in 5 sports
- Flag bearer: Ella Nicholas
- Medals: Gold 0 Silver 0 Bronze 0 Total 0

Summer Olympics appearances (overview)
- 1988; 1992; 1996; 2000; 2004; 2008; 2012; 2016; 2020; 2024; 2028

Cook Islands competed at the 2016 Summer Olympics in Rio de Janeiro, Brazil, from 5 to 21 August 2016. This was the nation's eighth consecutive appearance at the Summer Olympics.

Cook Islands Sports and National Olympic Committee selected a team of nine athletes, four men and five women, for the Games across five different sports. It was the nation's largest delegation sent to the Olympics, beating the record of eight athletes who attended the London Games four years earlier. For the second straight time in history, Cook Islands was represented by more female than male athletes at an Olympic circuit.

The Cook Islands roster featured three returning Olympians from London 2012, including sprinter Patricia Taea (women's 100 m), weightlifter Luisa Peters (women's +75 kg), and slalom kayaker Ella Nicholas, who accepted the honor of being the nation's flag bearer in the opening ceremony, along with her older brother Bryden. Cook Islands, however, has yet to win an Olympic medal.

== Athletics ==
Cook Islands has received universality slots from IAAF to send two athletes (one male and one female) to the Olympics.

Key

- Note–Ranks given for track events are within the athlete's heat only
- Q = Qualified for the next round
- q = Qualified for the next round as a fastest loser or, in field events, by position without achieving the qualifying target
- NR = National record
- N/A = Round not applicable for the event
- Bye = Athlete not required to compete in round

Track & road events

Athlete	Event	Heat		Quarterfinal		Semifinal		Final	
Athlete	Event	Result	Rank	Result	Rank	Result	Rank	Result	Rank
Alex Beddoes	Men's 800 m	1:52.76	9	—N/a		Did not advance			
Patricia Taea	Women's 100 m	12.30	2 Q	12.41	8	Did not advance			

== Canoeing ==
=== Slalom ===
Cook Islands canoeists have qualified a maximum of one boat in each of the following classes. Because Australia and New Zealand both permitted to compete in the men's and women's K-1 through the 2015 ICF Canoe Slalom World Championships, the spots have been automatically awarded to the Cook Islands as no continental race would be held with less than three nations eligible.

Athlete	Event	Preliminary						Semifinal		Final	
Athlete	Event	Run 1	Rank	Run 2	Rank	Best	Rank	Time	Rank	Time	Rank
Bryden Nicholas	Men's K-1	105.18	18	125.64	20	105.18	21	Did not advance			
Ella Nicholas	Women's K-1	119.69	17	316.72	21	119.69	18	Did not advance			

== Sailing ==
Sailors from the Cook Islands have qualified one boat each in men's Laser and women's Laser Radial class through the individual fleet World Championships, and Oceanian qualifying regattas.

Athlete	Event	Race											Net points	Final rank
Athlete	Event	1	2	3	4	5	6	7	8	9	10	M*	Net points	Final rank
Taua Henry	Men's Laser	40	39	43	34	37	40	45	~~BFD~~	44	41	EL	362	46
Teau McKenzie	Women's Laser Radial	30	36	35	~~37~~	34	32	33	35	34	35	EL	303	35

M = Medal race; EL = Eliminated – did not advance into the medal race

== Swimming ==
Cook Islands has received a Universality invitation from FINA to send two swimmers (one male and one female) to the Olympics.

Athlete	Event	Heat		Semifinal		Final	
Athlete	Event	Time	Rank	Time	Rank	Time	Rank
Wesley Roberts	Men's 1500 m freestyle	15:44.32	44	—N/a		Did not advance	
Tracy Keith-Matchitt	Women's 100 m freestyle	58.99	38	Did not advance			

== Weightlifting ==
Cook Islands has received an invitation from the Tripartite Commission to send London 2012 Olympian Luisa Peters in the women's super heavyweight category (+75 kg) to the Olympics.

Athlete	Event	Snatch		Clean & Jerk		Total	Rank
Athlete	Event	Result	Rank	Result	Rank	Total	Rank
Luisa Peters	Women's +75 kg	100	14	124	14	224	14
