= Cook Islands at the 1992 Summer Olympics =

- Flag of the Cook Islands
- IOC code: COK
- NOC: Cook Islands Sports & Olympic Association

in Barcelona
- Competitors: 2 (men) in 2 sports
- Medals: Gold 0 Silver 0 Bronze 0 Total 0

Summer Olympics appearances (overview)
- 1988; 1992; 1996; 2000; 2004; 2008; 2012; 2016; 2020; 2024

The Cook Islands sent a delegation to compete at the 1992 Summer Olympics in Barcelona, Spain from 25 July to 9 August 1992. This was the island nation's second appearance at a Summer Olympics, following the 1988 Summer Olympics. The delegation to Barcelona consisted of two competitors, track and field athlete Mark Sherwin and weightlifter Sam Nunuke Pera. Sherwin failed to advance out of his heat in the men's 100 meters, while Pera did not complete a lift in the men's 100 kilograms category.

== Background ==
The Cook Islands Sports and National Olympic Committee was recognized by the International Olympic Committee on 1 January 1986. The nation made its first Olympic appearance at the 1988 Summer Olympics, and have sent a delegation to every Summer Olympic Games since. Barcelona was therefore their second time competing in the Summer Olympics, and they have never participated in a Winter Olympic Games. As of 2018 the Cook Islands have never won a medal at the Olympics. The 1992 Summer Olympics were held from 25 July to 9 August; a total of 9,356 athletes represented 169 National Olympic Committees. The Cook Islands' delegation to Barcelona consisted of two competitors, track and field athlete Mark Sherwin and weightlifter Sam Nunuke Pera. Pera was the flagbearer for the opening ceremony.

== Competitors ==
The following is the list of number of competitors in the Games.

Sport	Men	Women	Total
Athletics	1	0	1
Weightlifting	1	–	1
Total	2	0	2

== Athletics ==
Mark Sherwin was 22 years old at the time of the Barcelona Olympics, and was making his Olympic debut. On 31 July, in the first round of the men's 100 meters, Sherwin was drawn into heat five. He finished his heat in 11.53 seconds, eighth and last place in the heat; only the top three from each heat and the next two fastest among all ten heats were able to advance, and he was eliminated. The slowest qualifier in his heat was John Myles-Mills of Ghana who posted a time of 10.64 seconds. The gold medal for the event was won by Linford Christie of Great Britain in a time of 9.96 seconds. Frankie Fredericks of Namibia took the silver, and Dennis Mitchell of the United States won the bronze. Sherwin would come back four years later to race the 100 meters again in Atlanta; while his time was faster, he was once again eliminated in the heats.

Athlete	Event	Heat		Quarterfinal		Semifinal		Final	
Athlete	Event	Result	Rank	Result	Rank	Result	Rank	Result	Rank
Mark Sherwin	Men's 100 m	11.53	8	Did not advance					

- Note–Ranks given for track events are within the athlete's heat only

== Weightlifting ==
Sam Nunuke Pera was 23 years old at the time of the Barcelona Olympics, and was making his first Olympic appearance. On 2 August, he took part in the 100 kg and under body weight event. Pera weighed in at 92.6 kg. In his three attempts at the snatch, he failed to lift 105 kilograms, the lightest lift attempted by any of the 25 competitors. By failing to post a mark in the snatch, he was eliminated from the competition before he could compete in the clean and jerk. The gold medal eventually went to Viktor Tregubov of the Unified Team, who posted a lift from the snatch of 190 kg and the clean and jerk mark of 220 kg; making his combined total 410 kg. Silver was won by Tymur Taimazov, also of the Unified Team, and bronze was taken by Waldemar Malak of Poland. Pera would return to represent the Cook Islands again in the 1996 Summer Olympics where he finished 24th; and the 2004 Summer Olympics in which he ranked 14th in his category. Between late 1996 and 2002 he was forced to abandon the sport due to losing his job.

Athlete	Event	Snatch		Clean & jerk		Total	Rank
Athlete	Event	Result	Rank	Result	Rank	Total	Rank
Sam Nunuke Pera	100 kg	~~105.0~~	DNF	–	–	–	DNF
