= Cook Islands at the 2012 Summer Olympics =

- Flag of the Cook Islands
- IOC code: COK
- NOC: Cook Islands Sports and National Olympic Committee
- Website: www.oceaniasport.com/cookis

in London
- Competitors: 8 in 5 sports
- Flag bearers: Helema Williams (opening); Luisa Peters (closing)
- Medals: Gold 0 Silver 0 Bronze 0 Total 0

Summer Olympics appearances (overview)
- 1988; 1992; 1996; 2000; 2004; 2008; 2012; 2016; 2020; 2024

Cook Islands, represented by eight athletes, competed at the 2012 Summer Olympics in London from 27 July to 12 August 2012. This was the nation's seventh appearance at the Olympics.

Cook Islands Sports and National Olympic Committee sent the nation's largest delegation to these Olympic games. A total of 8 athletes, 3 men and 5 women, had competed in 5 different sporting events; half of them had been given Universality places by the International Olympic Committee. For the first time in its history, Cook Islands was represented by more female than male athletes at an Olympic event. Slalom and sprint canoeing was the nation's only sport to debut at these Olympic games. Laser Radial sailor Helema Williams was the nation's flag bearer at the opening ceremony. Cook Islands, however, has yet to win an Olympic medal.

== Athletics ==
Men

| Athlete | Event | Heat | | Quarterfinal | | Semifinal | | Final | |
| Athlete | Event | Result | Rank | Result | Rank | Result | Rank | Result | Rank |
|---|---|---|---|---|---|---|---|---|---|
| Patrick Tuara | 100 m | 11.72 | 8 | did not advance | | | | | |

Women

| Athlete | Event | Heat | | Quarterfinal | | Semifinal | | Final | |
| Athlete | Event | Result | Rank | Result | Rank | Result | Rank | Result | Rank |
|---|---|---|---|---|---|---|---|---|---|
| Patricia Taea | 100 m | 12.47 | 3 | did not advance | | | | | |

Key

- Note–Ranks given for track events are within the athlete's heat only
- Q = Qualified for the next round
- q = Qualified for the next round as a fastest loser or, in field events, by position without achieving the qualifying target
- NR = National record
- N/A = Round not applicable for the event
- Bye = Athlete not required to compete in round

== Canoeing ==
The Cook Islands have qualified boats for the following events.

=== Slalom ===
| Athlete | Event | Preliminary | | | | | | Semifinal | | Final | |
| Athlete | Event | Run 1 | Rank | Run 2 | Rank | Best | Rank | Time | Rank | Time | Rank |
|---|---|---|---|---|---|---|---|---|---|---|---|
| Ella Nicholas | Women's K-1 | 118.69 | 15 | 118.29 | 16 | 118.29 | 18 | did not advance – Report | | | |

=== Sprint ===
| Athlete | Event | Heats | | Semifinals | | Final | |
| Athlete | Event | Time | Rank | Time | Rank | Time | Rank |
|---|---|---|---|---|---|---|---|
| Joshua Utanga | Men's K-1 200 m | 38.966 | 6 | did not advance | | | |
| Joshua Utanga | Men's K-1 1000 m | 4:32.064 | 8 | did not advance | | | |

== Sailing ==
Cook Islands has qualified 1 boat for each of the following events

Women

| Athlete | Event | Race | | | | | | | | | | | Net points | Final rank |
| Athlete | Event | 1 | 2 | 3 | 4 | 5 | 6 | 7 | 8 | 9 | 10 | M* | Net points | Final rank |
|---|---|---|---|---|---|---|---|---|---|---|---|---|---|---|
| Helema Williams | Laser Radial | ~~41~~ | 40 | 39 | 40 | 40 | 28 | 39 | 39 | 34 | 40 | EL | 339 | 41 |

M = Medal race; EL = Eliminated – did not advance into the medal race;

== Swimming ==
The Cook Islands has gained two "Universality places" from the FINA.

Men

| Athlete | Event | Heat | | Semifinal | | Final | |
| Athlete | Event | Time | Rank | Time | Rank | Time | Rank |
|---|---|---|---|---|---|---|---|
| Zachary Payne | 50 m freestyle | 25.26 | 41 | did not advance | | | |

Women

| Athlete | Event | Heat | | Semifinal | | Final | |
| Athlete | Event | Time | Rank | Time | Rank | Time | Rank |
|---|---|---|---|---|---|---|---|
| Celeste Brown | 50 m freestyle | 29.36 | 54 | did not advance | | | |

== Weightlifting ==
| Athlete | Event | Snatch | | Clean & Jerk | | Total | Rank |
| Athlete | Event | Result | Rank | Result | Rank | Total | Rank |
|---|---|---|---|---|---|---|---|
| Luisa Peters | Women's +75 kg | 82 | 13 | 100 | 13 | 182 | 12 |
