= Cook Islands at the 2008 Summer Olympics =

- Flag of the Cook Islands
- IOC code: COK
- NOC: Cook Islands Sports and National Olympic Committee
- Website: www.oceaniasport.com/cookis

in Beijing
- Competitors: 4 in 3 sports
- Flag bearers: Sam Pera Junior (opening); Tereapii Tapoki (closing)
- Medals: Gold 0 Silver 0 Bronze 0 Total 0

Summer Olympics appearances (overview)
- 1988; 1992; 1996; 2000; 2004; 2008; 2012; 2016; 2020; 2024; 2028

On behalf of the Cook Islands the Cook Islands Sports and National Olympic Committee sent a team to the 2008 Summer Olympics in Beijing, China, marking its sixth consecutive appearance at the Olympics since its debut in the 1988 Summer Olympics in Seoul, South Korea. The country sent four athletes to the Games across three sports and four distinct events (Gordon Heather and Tereapii Tapoki in track and field, Petero Okotai in swimming, and Sam Pera, Jr. in weightlifting). No athlete of the Cook Islander delegation progressed past the first rounds in their events (with the exception of weightlifting, where the first round was the only round) and did not go on to win medals. Pera was the nation's flag bearer at the ceremonies.

== Background ==
The Cook Islands are a collection of fifteen islands lying in the South Pacific Ocean that are governed under a single parliamentary entity. Some 10,000 people live in the dependency. The country is in a free association with New Zealand, who handles the nation's external affairs. The Cook Islands became self-governing in 1965. 23 years later, the Cook Islands sent their first delegation to the Olympics at the 1988 Summer Olympics in Seoul, South Korea. Between 1988 and 2008, the Cook Islands sent delegations to all six Summer Olympic games. The size of the Cook Islander delegation was largest in 1988, when it reached seven athletes. The size of the nation's delegation has not risen past four since then as of the Beijing Olympics.

At Beijing, four athletes competed for the Cook Islands. Of those competitors, three were men (Heather, Okotai, Pera) and one was a woman (Tapoki). They competed across three sports (track and field, swimming and weightlifting) and four distinct events (men's 100 meters and women's discus throw in track and field, men's 100 meters breaststroke in swimming, and men's heavyweight in weightlifting). As of the 2008 Olympics, there had not been a Cook Islander who has won a medal at the Olympics. Sam Pera, Jr., a weightlifter, was the flagbearer for the Cook Islands at the ceremonies.

== Athletics ==
=== Men's competition ===
Gordon Heather was the sole male Cook Islander participating in a track event at the Beijing Olympics, marked by his competition in the men's 100 meters dash. Born on Rarotonga, the most populous of the Cook Islands and the home to its capital city (district), Heather was 18 years old when he participated in the Beijing Olympic. He had not previously competed in any Olympic games. During the 14 August qualification round, Heather participated in the ninth heat, which included eight athletes. He finished the dash in 11.41 seconds, placing last in the heat. Micronesia's Jack Howard placed ahead of Heather (11.03 seconds) in seventh place. Heather's heat was led by Qatar's Samuel Adelebari Francis (10.40 seconds) and Trinidad and Tobago's Marc Burns (10.46 seconds). Overall, 80 athletes competed in the event's qualification round, and the Cook Islander sprinter ranked 75th. He did not advance to further rounds.

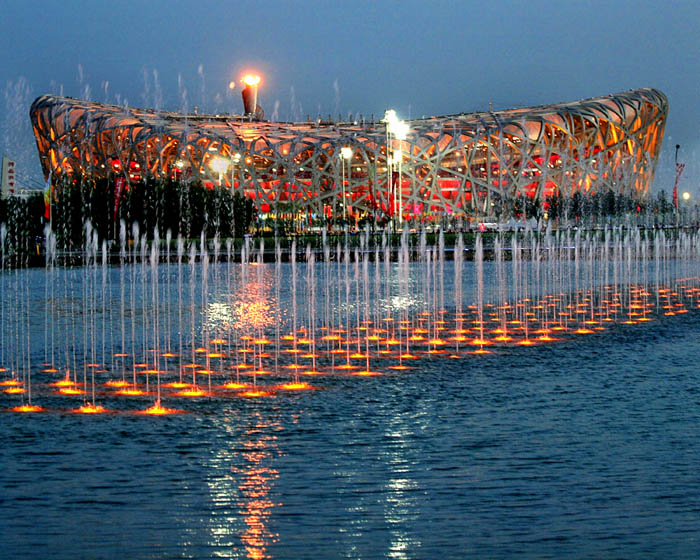
The Beijing National Stadium, where Heather and Tapoki competed in their events

=== Women's competition ===
Tereapii Tapoki was the only female Cook Islander participating in a track and field event in Beijing, and was the only Cook Islander in her nation's delegation during those games. Born in Oiretumu, a settlement on the island of Mauke, Tapoki's debut at the Olympics was in the 2004 Athens games when she was 20 years old; she represented the Cook Islands in the same event during those games. Tapoki was placed in the first heat during the 15 August qualification round, which included 19 athletes. The athletes were given three opportunities to throw the discus. During the first attempt, Tapoki threw the discus 46.77 meters, placing 12th out of the 19 competitors in her heat. Her second attempt landed 44.11 meters away, placing her 15th out of those who attempted the discus during that round. She marked her highest score, 48.35 meters, on her third and final attempt. Of those in her heat, this placed her in 19th place. 37 athletes registered marks during the qualifying round, with Tapoki ranking last. She did not advance to later rounds.

=== Summary ===
Men

Athlete	Event	Heat		Quarterfinal		Semifinal		Final	
Athlete	Event	Result	Rank	Result	Rank	Result	Rank	Result	Rank
Gordon Heather	100 m	11.41	8	Did not advance					

Women

Athlete	Event	Qualification		Final	
Athlete	Event	Distance	Position	Distance	Position
Tereapii Tapoki	Discus throw	48.35	37	Did not advance	

Key

- Note–Ranks given for track events are within the athlete's heat only
- Q = Qualified for the next round
- q = Qualified for the next round as a fastest loser or, in field events, by position without achieving the qualifying target
- NR = National record
- N/A = Round not applicable for the event
- Bye = Athlete not required to compete in round

== Swimming ==
Petero Okotai participated on the Cook Islands' behalf in the men's 100 meters breaststroke. He was the only Cook Islander participating in the event, or in any swimming event in general in Beijing. Okotai was 27 years old at the time of his participation at the 2008 Summer Olympics, and had not previously participated in any Olympic games. During the preliminary rounds, which took place on 9 August, the Cook Islander participated in the first heat, which included three people. Of those three, Okotai ranked third after finishing the event in 1:20.20. Oman's Mohammed Al-Habsi ranked ahead of Okotai (1:12.28), while Qatar's Osama Mohammed Ye Alarag took first in the heat (1:10.83). Of the 63 athletes who finished the qualification heats, Okotai ranked last. He did not advance to later rounds.

Athlete	Event	Heat		Semifinal		Final	
Athlete	Event	Time	Rank	Time	Rank	Time	Rank
Petero Okotai	100 m breaststroke	1:20.20	63	Did not advance			

== Weightlifting ==
Sam Pera, Jr. was the only Cook Islander participating in weightlifting during the Beijing Olympics. Born on the island of Rarotonga, the most populous Cook Island, Pera is the son of Sam Nunuke Pera, who competed for the Cook Islands in the same event in 1992 (Barcelona), 1996 (Atlanta) and 2004 (Athens). Sam Pera, Jr. participated in men's _105kg (heavyweight) at age 19, which marked the first time he competed in any Olympic games. The event occurred on 19 August, and included 14 competitors in all. The snatch phase of the event occurred first, and Pera was given three tries. On the first, he successfully lifted 148 kilograms; on the second, he unsuccessfully attempted to lift 155 kilograms; and on the third and final, he lifted the 155 kilograms with success. The clean and jerk phrase followed, and Pera was again given three attempts. He successfully lifted 188 kilograms on his first and second tries, and successfully lifted 195 kilograms on his third attempt. Because his highest score during the snatch round was 155 kilograms and his highest during clean and jerk was 195 kilograms, the total of the two equaled his total score of 350 points. Overall, Pera ranked twelfth of the thirteen finishing athletes. Tonga's Maamaloa Lolohea ranked behind him (313 points), while Finland's Antti Everi ranked ahead (366 points). The year's gold medalist, Matthias Steiner, earned 461 points.

Athlete	Event	Snatch		Clean & Jerk		Total	Rank
Athlete	Event	Result	Rank	Result	Rank	Total	Rank
Sam Pera, Jr.	Men's +105 kg	155	12	195	12	350	12
