= Cook Islands at the 2004 Summer Olympics =

- Flag of the Cook Islands
- IOC code: COK
- NOC: Cook Islands Sports and National Olympic Committee
- Website: www.oceaniasport.com/cookis

in Athens
- Competitors: 3 in 2 sports
- Flag bearer: Sam Nunuke Pera
- Medals: Gold 0 Silver 0 Bronze 0 Total 0

Summer Olympics appearances (overview)
- 1988; 1992; 1996; 2000; 2004; 2008; 2012; 2016; 2020; 2024

The Cook Islands was represented at the 2004 Summer Olympics in Athens, Greece by the Cook Islands Sports and National Olympic Committee.

In total, three athletes including two men and one woman represented the Cook Islands in two different sports including athletics and weightlifting.

== Competitors ==
In total, three athletes represented the Cook Islands at the 2004 Summer Olympics in Athens, Greece across two different sports.

Sport	Men	Women	Total
Athletics	1	1	2
Weightlifting	1	0	1
Total	2	1	3

== Athletics ==
In total, two Cook Islander athletes participated in the athletics events – Harmon Harmon in the men's 100 m and Tereapii Tapoki in the women's discus throw.

Most of the athletics events – including those which Cook Islander athletes took part in – took place at the Athens Olympic Stadium in Marousi, Athens from 18 to 29 August 2004.

The heats for the men's 100 m took place on 21 August 2004. Harmon finished eighth in his heat in a time of 11.22 seconds and he did not advance to the quarter-finals.

Athlete	Event	Heat		Quarterfinal		Semifinal		Final	
Athlete	Event	Result	Rank	Result	Rank	Result	Rank	Result	Rank
Harmon Harmon	100 m	11.22	8	did not advance					

The qualifying round for the women's discus throw took place on 20 August 2004. Tapoki contested qualifying group A. Her best throw of 48.12 m came on her second attempt. However, it was not enough to advance to the final and she finished 40th overall. This was later upgraded to 39th after Iryna Yatchanka of Belarus was disqualified for doping.

Athlete	Event	Qualification		Final	
Athlete	Event	Distance	Position	Distance	Position
Tereapii Tapoki	Discus throw	48.12	40	did not advance	

== Weightlifting ==
In total, one Cook Islander athlete participated in the weightlifting events – Sam Nunuke Pera in the men's −105 kg category.

The weightlifting events took place at the Nikaia Olympic Weightlifting Hall in Piraeus, Athens from 15 to 25 August 2004.

The men's –105 kg category took place on 24 August 2004. Pera lifted 135 kg (snatch) and 170 kg (clean and jerk) for a combined total of 305 kg to finish 14th.

Athlete	Event	Snatch		Clean & Jerk		Total	Rank
Athlete	Event	Result	Rank	Result	Rank	Total	Rank
Sam Nunuke Pera	Men's −105 kg	135	15	170	14	305	13
