= Cook Islands at the 2024 World Aquatics Championships =

- Flag of the Cook Islands
- FINA code: COK
- National federation: Cook Islands Aquatics Federation
- Website: cookislandsaquatics.com

in Fukuoka, Japan
- Competitors: 4 in 1 sport
- Medals: Gold 0 Silver 0 Bronze 0 Total 0

World Aquatics Championships appearances
- 2007; 2009; 2011; 2013; 2015; 2017; 2019; 2022; 2023; 2024

Cook Islands is set to compete at the 2024 World Aquatics Championships in Doha, Qatar from 2 to 18 February.

== Swimming ==
Cook Islands entered 4 swimmers.

Men

Athlete	Event	Heat		Semifinal		Final	
Athlete	Event	Time	Rank	Time	Rank	Time	Rank
Jacob Story	100 metre breaststroke	1:04.32	53	Did not advance			
Jacob Story	200 metre breaststroke	2:22.66	30	Did not advance			
Wesley Roberts	100 metre freestyle	49.41	30	Did not advance			
Wesley Roberts	200 metre freestyle	1:49.78	35	Did not advance			

Women

Athlete	Event	Heat		Semifinal		Final	
Athlete	Event	Time	Rank	Time	Rank	Time	Rank
Lanihei Connolly	50 metre breaststroke	32.03	26	Did not advance			
Lanihei Connolly	100 metre breaststroke	1:10.87	34	Did not advance			
Mia Laban	50 metre butterfly	30.08	43	Did not advance			
Mia Laban	100 metre butterfly	1:07.35	39	Did not advance			

Mixed

Athlete	Event	Heat		Final	
Athlete	Event	Time	Rank	Time	Rank
Lanihei Connolly; Mia Laban; Wesley Roberts; Jacob Story	4 × 100 m medley relay	4:05.80	22	Did not advance	
