= Cook Islands at the 2024 Summer Olympics =

Sporting event delegation

- IOC code: COK
- NOC: Cook Islands Sports and National Olympic Committee
- Website: www.oceaniasport.com/cookis

in Paris, France 26 July 2024 – 11 August 2024
- Competitors: 2 (1 man and 1 woman) in 2 sports
- Flag bearers (opening): Alex Beddoes and Lanihei Connolly
- Flag bearer (closing): Lanihei Connolly
- Medals: Gold 0 Silver 0 Bronze 0 Total 0

Summer Olympics appearances (overview)
- 1988; 1992; 1996; 2000; 2004; 2008; 2012; 2016; 2020; 2024

The Cook Islands competed at the 2024 Summer Olympics in Paris from 26 July to 11 August 2024. It was the nation's tenth consecutive appearance at the Summer Olympics. The Cook Islands sent their first delegation to the Olympics at the 1988 Summer Olympics in Seoul, South Korea.

In 2024, the country sent two athletes to the Olympics across two sports. They were Alex Beddoes in athletics and Lanihei Connolly in swimming. No athlete from the Cook Islander delegation progressed past the first rounds in their events. Beddoes and Connolly were the flagbearers at the opening ceremony, and Connolly was the flagbearer for the closing ceremony.

== Background ==
In 1986, the Cook Islands Sports and National Olympic Committee was recognised by the International Olympic Committee (IOC). The Cook Islands sent their first delegation to the 1988 Summer Olympics in Seoul. Since then, the country has sent delegations to all Summer Olympics. As of the 2024 Games, no Cook Islander has won an Olympic medal.

The 2024 Summer Olympics were held from 26 July to 11 August 2024 in Paris. The Cook Islands sent a delegation of two athletes, Alex Beddoes and Lanihei Connolly, who were the flagbearers at the opening ceremony, though Connolly was the sole flagbearer at the closing ceremony.

== Athletics ==
The Cook Islands were represented by one athlete at the 2024 Summer Olympics in athletics, Alex Beddoes. He was making his third appearance at the Olympics after the 2016 and 2020 games. He qualified by receiving a universality spot in the men's 800 metres. However, he had to withdraw due to injury and could not advance. The event was eventually won by Emmanuel Wanyonyi of Kenya in a time of 1:41.19. The silver medal was won by Marco Arop of Canada, and the bronze by Djamel Sedjati of Algeria.

Key

- Note—Ranks given for track events are within the athlete's heat only
- DNS = Did not start

Track and road events

Athlete	Event	Heat		Repechage		Semi-final		Final	
Athlete	Event	Result	Rank	Result	Rank	Result	Rank	Result	Rank
Alex Beddoes	Men's 800 m	DNS							

== Swimming ==
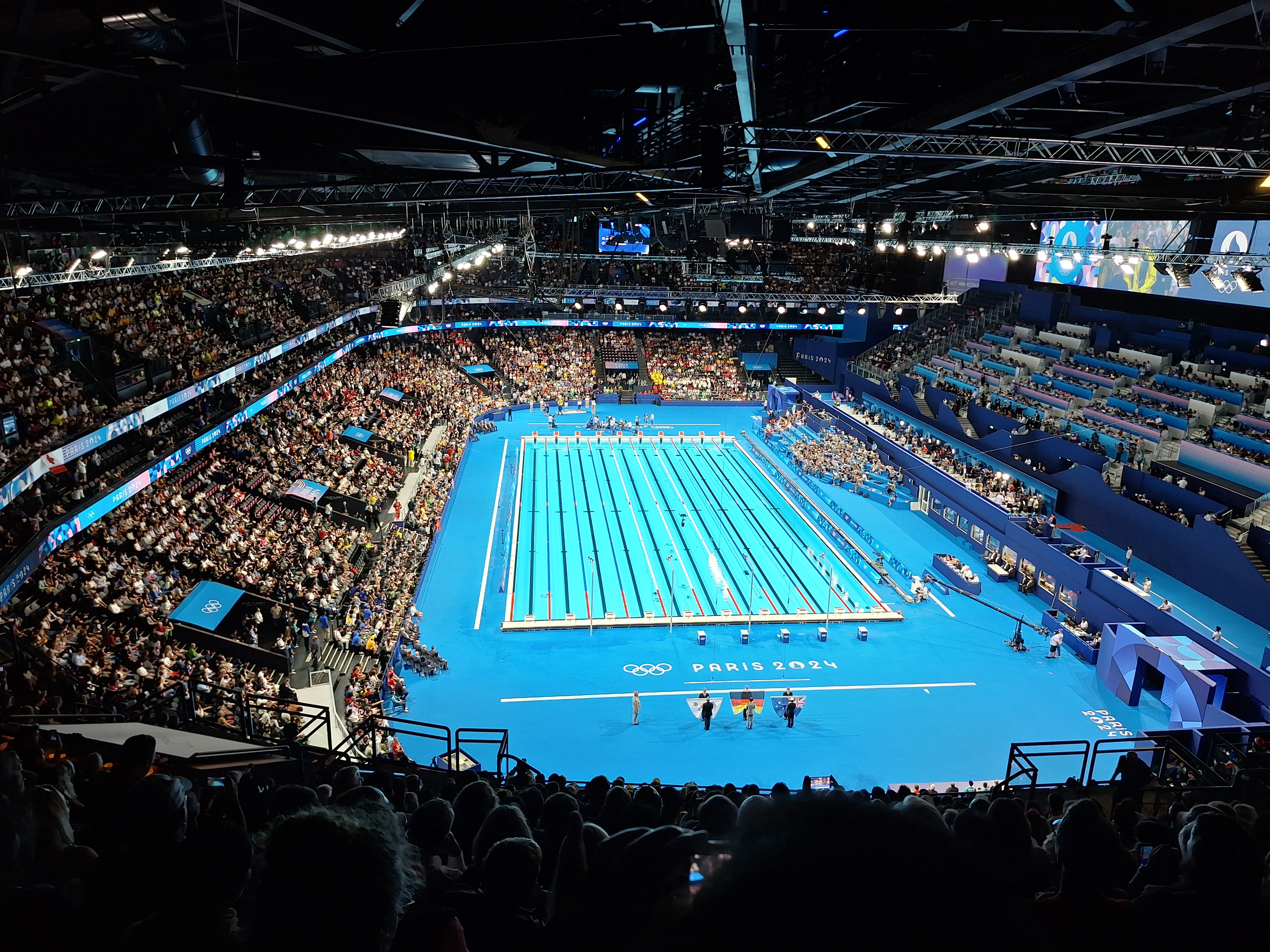
The venue at which Connolly's swimming event took place.

One Cook Islands swimmer, Lanihei Connolly, competed at Paris 2024, after receiving a universality spot for the women's 100 metres breaststroke. Connolly was making her debut appearance at the Olympics. On 28 July, she participated in heat two, but finished last out of eight with a time of 1:10.45, which was 3.18 seconds behind the winner. She failed to advance to the semi-finals. The event was eventually won by Tatjana Smith of South Africa in a time of 1:05.28. The silver medal was won by Tang Qianting of China, and the bronze by Mona McSharry of Ireland.

Athlete	Event	Heat		Semi-final		Final	
Athlete	Event	Time	Rank	Time	Rank	Time	Rank
Lanihei Connolly	Women's 100 m breaststroke	1:10.45	32	Did not advance			
