= Cook Islands at the 2022 World Aquatics Championships =

- Flag of the Cook Islands
- FINA code: COK
- National federation: Cook Islands Aquatics Federation

in Budapest, Hungary
- Competitors: 3 in 1 sport
- Medals: Gold 0 Silver 0 Bronze 0 Total 0

World Aquatics Championships appearances
- 2007; 2009; 2011; 2013; 2015; 2017; 2019; 2022; 2023; 2024

Cook Islands competed at the 2022 World Aquatics Championships in Budapest, Hungary from 18 June to 3 July.

== Swimming ==
Swimmers from Cook Islands have achieved qualifying standards in the following events.

Athlete	Event	Heat		Semifinal		Final	
Athlete	Event	Time	Rank	Time	Rank	Time	Rank
Bede Aitu	Men's 50 m backstroke	28.03	39	did not advance			
Bede Aitu	Men's 100 m backstroke	59.54	39	did not advance			
Wesley Roberts	Men's 100 m freestyle	50.43	40	did not advance			
Wesley Roberts	Men's 200 m freestyle	1:50.24	37	did not advance			
Wesley Roberts	Men's 400 m freestyle	4:00.67	34	—		did not advance	
Kirsten Fisher-Marsters	Women's 50 m breaststroke	34.17	42	did not advance			
Kirsten Fisher-Marsters	Women's 100 m breaststroke	1:15.57	44	did not advance			
