= Cook Islands at the 2000 Summer Olympics =

- Flag of the Cook Islands
- IOC code: COK
- NOC: Cook Islands Sports & Olympic Association
- Website: www.oceaniasport.com/cookis

in Sydney
- Competitors: 2 (1 man and 1 woman) in 2 sports
- Flag bearer: Turia Vogel
- Medals: Gold 0 Silver 0 Bronze 0 Total 0

Summer Olympics appearances (overview)
- 1988; 1992; 1996; 2000; 2004; 2008; 2012; 2016; 2020; 2024

On behalf of the Cook Islands, the Cook Islands Sports and Olympic Association (renamed the Cook Islands Sports and National Olympic Committee in 2002 sent a team that competed at the 2000 Summer Olympics in Sydney, Australia.

== Athletics ==
Key

- Note–Ranks given for track events are within the athlete's heat only
- Q = Qualified for the next round
- q = Qualified for the next round as a fastest loser or, in field events, by position without achieving the qualifying target
- NR = National record
- N/A = Round not applicable for the event
- Bye = Athlete not required to compete in round

Men

Athlete	Event	Heat		Quarterfinal		Semifinal		Final	
Athlete	Event	Result	Rank	Result	Rank	Result	Rank	Result	Rank
Teina Teiti	100 m	11.22	7	did not advance					

== Sailing ==
Athlete	Event	Race											Net points	Final rank
Athlete	Event	1	2	3	4	5	6	7	8	9	10	11	Net points	Final rank
Turia Vogel	Women's Mistral	19	14	18	13	~~23~~	19	20	19	9	~~21~~	18	149	20
