= Cook Islands at the 1988 Summer Olympics =

- Flag of the Cook Islands
- IOC code: COK
- NOC: Cook Islands Sports & Olympic Association

in Seoul
- Competitors: 7 (6 men and 1 woman) in 3 sports
- Flag bearer: William Taramai
- Medals: Gold 0 Silver 0 Bronze 0 Total 0

Summer Olympics appearances (overview)
- 1988; 1992; 1996; 2000; 2004; 2008; 2012; 2016; 2020; 2024

The Cook Islands competed in the Olympic Games for the first time at the 1988 Summer Olympics in Seoul, South Korea. The Cook Islands Sports and National Olympic Committee was formed and recognized in 1986.

== Competitors ==
The following is the list of number of competitors in the Games.

Sport	Men	Women	Total
Athletics	1	1	2
Boxing	3	–	3
Weightlifting	2	–	2
Total	6	1	7

== Athletics ==
=== Men ===
Athlete	Events	Heat		Semifinal		Final	
Athlete	Events	Time	Position	Time	Position	Time	Position
William Taramai	400 m	DNS	-	Did not advance			
William Taramai	800 m	1:58.80	67	Did not advance			

=== Women ===
Athlete	Events	Heat		Semifinal		Final	
Athlete	Events	Time	Position	Time	Position	Time	Position
Erin Tierney	100 m	12.52	60	Did not advance			
Erin Tierney	200 m	26.16	56	Did not advance			
Erin Tierney	Long Jump	DNS				Did not advance	

== Boxing ==
Athlete	Event	Round of 64	Round of 32	Round of 16	Quarterfinals	Semifinals	Final
Athlete	Event	Opposition Result	Opposition Result	Opposition Result	Opposition Result	Opposition Result	Opposition Result
Zekaria Williams	Flyweight	Timofey Skryabin (URS); L 0:5	Did not advance				
Richard Pittman	Featherweight		Dumsane Mabuza (SWZ); W 4:1	Ya'acov Shmuel (ISR); L 5:0	Did not advance		
Terepai Maea	Lightweight		Mark Kennedy (JAM); L RSCO	Did not advance			

== Weightlifting ==
Men

Athlete	Event	Snatch		Clean & jerk		Total	Rank
Athlete	Event	Result	Rank	Result	Rank	Total	Rank
Joseph Kauvai (Note: otherwise Joseph Kavuai)	Middle-heavyweight	85 kg	26	115 kg	25	200 kg	25
Michael Tererui	Heavyweight	105 kg	18	137.5 kg	16	242.5 kg	16
