= Cook Islands at the 2019 World Aquatics Championships =

- Flag of the Cook Islands
- FINA code: COK
- National federation: Cook Islands Aquatics Federation

in Gwangju, South Korea
- Medals: Gold 0 Silver 0 Bronze 0 Total 0

World Aquatics Championships appearances
- 2007; 2009; 2011; 2013; 2015; 2017; 2019; 2022; 2023; 2024

Cook Islands competed at the 2019 World Aquatics Championships in Gwangju, South Korea from 12 to 28 July.

== Swimming ==
Cook Islands entered three swimmers.

Men

| Athlete | Event | Heat | | Semifinal | | Final | |
| Athlete | Event | Time | Rank | Time | Rank | Time | Rank |
|---|---|---|---|---|---|---|---|
| Malcolm Richardson | 50 m breaststroke | 29.36 | 55 | did not advance | | | |
| Malcolm Richardson | 100 m breaststroke | 1:06.64 | 76 | did not advance | | | |
| Wesley Roberts | 200 m freestyle | 1:51.25 | 43 | did not advance | | | |
| Wesley Roberts | 400 m freestyle | 3:58.12 | 35 | — | | did not advance | |

Women

| Athlete | Event | Heat | | Semifinal | | Final | |
| Athlete | Event | Time | Rank | Time | Rank | Time | Rank |
|---|---|---|---|---|---|---|---|
| Kirsten Fisher-Marsters | 50 m breaststroke | 34.44 | 40 | did not advance | | | |
| Kirsten Fisher-Marsters | 100 m breaststroke | 1:17.19 | 49 | did not advance | | | |
