= Cook Islands at the 2023 World Aquatics Championships =

- Flag of the Cook Islands
- World Aquatics code: COK
- National federation: Cook Islands Aquatics Federation
- Website: cookislandsaquatics.com

in Fukuoka, Japan
- Competitors: 2 in 1 sport
- Medals: Gold 0 Silver 0 Bronze 0 Total 0

World Aquatics Championships appearances
- 2007; 2009; 2011; 2013; 2015; 2017; 2019; 2022; 2023; 2024; 2025

Cook Islands is set to compete at the 2023 World Aquatics Championships in Fukuoka, Japan from 14 to 30 July.

== Swimming ==
Cook Islands entered 2 swimmers.

Men

Athlete	Event	Heat		Semifinal		Final	
Athlete	Event	Time	Rank	Time	Rank	Time	Rank
Bede Aitu	50 metre backstroke	28.19	54	Did not advance			
Bede Aitu	100 metre backstroke	1:01.15	58	Did not advance			
Wesley Roberts	100 metre freestyle	50	49	Did not advance			
Wesley Roberts	200 metre freestyle	1:51.27	39	Did not advance			
