= Cook Islands at the 2013 World Aquatics Championships =

- Flag of the Cook Islands
- FINA code: COK
- National federation: Cook Islands Aquatics Federation

in Barcelona, Spain
- Competitors: 1 in 1 sports
- Medals: Gold 0 Silver 0 Bronze 0 Total 0

World Aquatics Championships appearances
- 2007; 2009; 2011; 2013; 2015; 2017; 2019; 2022; 2023; 2024

The Cook Islands competed at the 2013 World Aquatics Championships in Barcelona, Spain from July 20 to August 4, 2013.

== Open water swimming ==
Cook Islands has qualified one swimmer in open water competition.

Men

Athlete	Event	Time	Rank
Hayden Vickers	5 km	1:10:56.3	53
