= Sailing at the 2015 Pacific Games =

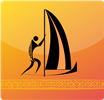
- Sailing pictogram for the Games
- Venue: Royal Papua Yacht Club, Port Moresby
- Dates: 6–11 July

Sailing at the 2015 Pacific Games was held at Port Moresby from 6–11 July 2015. The regatta was hosted by Royal Papua Yacht Club in Konedobu, with men's, women's and team events taking place on the Konebada course. Equipment classes were the Laser and Laser Radial dinghies, and the Hobie 16 catamaran.

Sailors from Australia and New Zealand were invited to compete at the Pacific games for the first time.

== Medal summary ==
=== Medal table ===
* Host nation (Papua New Guinea)

Rank	Nation	Gold	Silver	Bronze	Total
1	New Caledonia	2	3	1	6
2	Cook Islands	2	1	1	4
3	Australia	2	0	2	4
4	Fiji	0	1	1	2
5	Papua New Guinea*	0	1	0	1
6	Tahiti	0	0	1	1
Totals (6 entries)		6	6	6	18

=== Results ===
Event	Gold	Silver	Bronze	Refs
Hobie Cat pair	New Caledonia; Leo Belouard; Jerome Le Gal	New Caledonia; Thomas Dupoint; Jeremy Picot	Fiji; Shayne Brodie; Taleilisi Brodie	
Hobie Cat team	New Caledonia; Leo Belouard; Jerome Le Gal; Thomas Dupoint; Jeremy Picot	Fiji; Shayne Brodie; Taleilisi Brodie; Epeli Lulusago; Saimoni Naura	Tahiti; Arnaud Bourdelon; Emmanuel Rosseau; Gwenaelle Janicaud; Tuiterai Salmon	
Men's Laser single	Mark Spearman (AUS)	Maxime Mazard (NCL)	Thomas Vincent (AUS)	
Men's Laser team	Australia; Mark Spearman; Thomas Vincent	New Caledonia; Maxime Mazard; Vincent Trinquet	Cook Islands; Peter Elisa Henry; Joshua Ioane	
Women's Laser Radial single	Helema Williams (COK)	Teau McKenzie (COK)	Carissa Bridge (AUS)	
Women's Laser Radial team	Cook Islands; Helema Williams; Teau McKenzie	Papua New Guinea; Rose-Lee Numa; Janey Vaa	New Caledonia; Noa Ancian; Juliette Bone	

== See also ==
- Sailing at the Pacific Games
