= Cook Islands at the 2015 World Aquatics Championships =

- Flag of the Cook Islands
- FINA code: COK
- National federation: Cook Islands Aquatics Federation

in Kazan, Russia
- Competitors: 2 in 1 sport
- Medals: Gold 0 Silver 0 Bronze 0 Total 0

World Aquatics Championships appearances
- 2007; 2009; 2011; 2013; 2015; 2017; 2019; 2022; 2023; 2024

Cook Islands competed at the 2015 World Aquatics Championships in Kazan, Russia from 24 July to 9 August 2015.

== Swimming ==
Swimmers from the Cook Islands have achieved qualifying standards in the following events (up to a maximum of 2 swimmers in each event at the A-standard entry time, and 1 at the B-standard):

Men

Athlete	Event	Heat		Semifinal		Final	
Athlete	Event	Time	Rank	Time	Rank	Time	Rank
Temaruata Strickland	50 m freestyle	DNS		Did not advance			
Temaruata Strickland	100 m backstroke	1:10.89	66	Did not advance			

Women

Athlete	Event	Heat		Semifinal		Final	
Athlete	Event	Time	Rank	Time	Rank	Time	Rank
Tracy Keith-Matchitt	50 m freestyle	27.16	60	Did not advance			
Tracy Keith-Matchitt	100 m freestyle	57.85	51	Did not advance			
