= Cook Islands at the 2017 World Aquatics Championships =

- Flag of the Cook Islands
- FINA code: COK
- National federation: Cook Islands Aquatics Federation

in Budapest, Hungary
- Competitors: 2 in 1 sport
- Medals: Gold 0 Silver 0 Bronze 0 Total 0

World Aquatics Championships appearances
- 2007; 2009; 2011; 2013; 2015; 2017; 2019; 2022; 2023; 2024

The Cook Islands competed at the 2017 World Aquatics Championships in Budapest, Hungary from 14 July to 30 July.

== Swimming ==
Cook Islands has received a Universality invitation from FINA to send two male swimmers to the World Championships.

Athlete	Event	Heat		Semifinal		Final	
Athlete	Event	Time	Rank	Time	Rank	Time	Rank
Wesley Roberts	Men's 200 m freestyle	1:51.67	53	did not advance			
Wesley Roberts	Men's 400 m freestyle	3:59.29	42	—		did not advance	
Wesley Roberts	Men's 1500 m freestyle	16:15.04	36	—		did not advance	
Temaruata Strickland	Men's 50 m freestyle	25.21	96	did not advance			
Temaruata Strickland	Men's 100 m freestyle	55.82	89	did not advance			
