= Jane Nicholas =

Cook Islands Olympic canoeist

Personal information
- Born: 11 November 1992 (age 33) Te Puna, New Zealand
- Home town: Tauranga
- Height: 1.68 m (5 ft 6 in)

Sport
- Country: Cook Islands
- Sport: Canoe slalom
- Events: K1 & C1
- Club: Canoe Slalom Bay of Plenty
- Coached by: Mike Dawson

Jane Nicholas is a slalom canoeist who has competed at the international level since 2009. Jane represented New Zealand from 2009 to 2018, before switching to the Cook Islands for the 2019 season, her father's country of birth.

== Career ==
Nicholas made her international debut for New Zealand aged 16 at the 2009 Canoe Slalom World Cup, where she finished 26th in the overall ranking. At the Foix 2010 Junior World Championships Jane finished 14th in C1 and 40th in K1. At her final U23 World Championships at Foz do Iguaçu in 2015 she finished in 7th (K1 team), 16th (C1) and 29th (K1).

At the end of the 2018 season Jane decided to switch her representation to the Cook Islands for a number of reasons including: support from both NOC's; being of Cook Islander heritage; and Luuka Jones' dominance of the sport in New Zealand. Regarding the decision Nicholas stated: "I felt loyal to New Zealand as they had supported me through my whole slalom career. But I had the support of the Cooks, as well as New Zealand, to make the change".

Jane earned her best senior World Championships results of 22nd (C1) and 39th (K1) at the 2010 and 2019 events, respectively. The latter performance earned the Cook Islands an Olympic quota for the K1 event at the Tokyo Olympics as the 16th ranked eligible NOC. She was also permitted to compete in the inaugural C1 event due to having already earned a quota, making her 1 of 8 women to compete in both events.

At the delayed 2020 Olympics Jane finished in 22nd place in K1 after being eliminated in the semifinal, and 21st in C1, being eliminated in the heats.

== Personal life ==
Her father Rob had grown up in the Cooks Islands and moved to New Zealand at 15 with a high school scholarship. Nicholas herself was born in Te Puna, near Tauranga. At Tauranga Girls' College, she competed in water polo, basketball, netball, volleyball, cross country and canoe polo. By her final year, she had committed to basketball and canoe slalom. She continued to visit the Cook Islands and her relatives in Rarotonga every year. Her sister Ella Nicholas competed at two Olympics, racing at the 2012 and 2016 Olympic Games for the Cook Islands and finishing 18th in the K1 category on both occasions. At the Rio Games Ella was also the Cook Islands flagbearer at the opening ceremony, and their brother Bryden Nicholas made his Olympic debut, finishing 21st in the men's K1 event.

Jane has studied medicine at the University of Otago in Dunedin and has aspirations to become an orthopaedic surgeon.

Nicholas resigned from her job at the Bay of Plenty District Health Board at the end of May 2019 in order to dedicate herself to qualifying for the 2020 Tokyo Olympics and become the third member of their family to compete as Olympians. Following the postponement of the 2020 Summer Olympics she continued to work in a hospital as a doctor post-lockdown. More recently she has been continuing her orthopaedic training based at the Nelson hospital and has been participating in competitive Padel.
