= Bijan Rezaei =

Swedish weightlifter

Personal information
- Nationality: Swedish
- Born: 20 December 1964 (age 60); Rudsar, Iran

Sport
- Sport: Weightlifting

Bijan Rezaei (Persian: بیژن رضایی, born 20 December 1964) is a former Iranian-Swedish weightlifter. He competed in the men's heavyweight I event at the 1992 Summer Olympics.
