= William Taramai =

Personal information
- Nationality: Cook Islander
- Born: 23 April 1961 (age 65)

Sport
- Sport: Sprinting, middle-distance
- Events: 400 metres, 800 metres

William Taramai (born 23 April 1961) is a Cook Islander sprinter and middle-distance runner. He is one of the first Cook Islander Olympians and was designated as the first flag bearer for the Cook Islands at any edition of the Olympic Games.

At the 1988 Summer Olympics, he had competed in the heats of the men's 800 metres. In his heat, he had placed last. He was also set to compete in the men's 400 metres though did not start in his event.

== Biography ==
William Taramai was born on 23 April 1961.

The Cook Islands made their first appearance at the Olympic Games at the 1988 Summer Olympics in Seoul, South Korea. Taramai was part of the contingent and is one of the first Cook Islander Olympians. He was designated as the first flag bearer for the Cook Islands at the Olympics, holding the flag in the 1988 Summer Olympics Parade of Nations during the games' opening ceremony.

He first competed in the heats of the men's 800 metres on 23 September at the Seoul Olympic Stadium. Against seven other athletes in his heat, he had run in a time of 1:58.80 and had placed last. He did not advance further in the event. The eventual winner of the event was Paul Ereng of Kenya who had won in a time of 1:43.55. The following day, he was set to compete in the heats of the men's 400 metres against seven other athletes in the same location. In the event, he did not start in his heat, and thus did not advance further. The eventual winner of the event was Steve Lewis of the United States who had won in a time of 43.87 seconds. After the Summer Games, he had set a personal best in the 800 metres with a time of 1:56.29 in 1989.
