= Nazar Kadir =

Iraqi weightlifter

Personal information
- Nationality: Iraqi
- Born: 1 June 1966 (age 58)

Sport
- Sport: Weightlifting

Nazar Kadir (born 1 June 1966) is an Iraqi weightlifter. He competed in the men's heavyweight I event at the 1992 Summer Olympics.
