= David Langon =

American weightlifter (born 1967)

Personal information
- Born: January 24, 1967 (age 59) San Leandro, California, United States

Sport
- Sport: Weightlifting

David Langon (born January 24, 1967) is an American former weightlifter. He competed in the men's heavyweight I event at the 1992 Summer Olympics.
