= Redha Shaaban =

Kuwaiti weightlifter

Personal information
- Native name: رضا شعبان
- Full name: Redha Shaaban
- Nationality: Kuwaiti
- Born: 18 September 1963 (age 62)

Sport
- Sport: Weightlifting

Redha Shaaban (Arabic: رضا شعبان; born 18 September 1963) is a Kuwaiti weightlifter. Shaaban would compete at the 1992 Summer Olympics, representing Kuwait in weightlifting. He would be the first competitor to represent the nation in weightlifting at any edition of the Summer Games. He would compete in the men's first heavyweight event and placed 21st out of a total of 25 competitors in the event.

After the 1992 Summer Games, he would represent the nation at another Olympic Games, the 1996 Summer Olympics. He would compete in a restructured men's first heavyweight event. There, he placed 26th out of a total of 28 competitors in the event.

== Biography ==
Redha Shaaban was born on 18 September 1963. Shaaban would compete at the 1992 Summer Olympics in Barcelona, Spain, representing Kuwait in men's weightlifting. He would be the first Kuwaiti athlete to compete in weightlifting at an Olympic Games.

Shabaan would compete in the men's first heavyweight event for competitors that weighed 100 kilograms or less. He would compete on 2 August against 24 other competitors. There, he would place 21st with a total of 250 kilograms.

After the 1992 Summer Games, he would again represent Kuwait at another Olympic Games. He would compete at the 1996 Summer Olympics in Los Angeles, United States. There, he would compete in a restructured men's first heavyweight event that required competitors to weigh 99 kilograms or less. He would compete on 28 July against 27 other competitors. He would place 26th with a total of 255 kilograms.

As of the 2024 Summer Olympics, Shaaban remains as the only Kuwaiti weightlifter to compete at an Olympic Games.
