= Abdollah Fatemi =

Iranian weightlifter

Abdollah Fatemi Rika
Personal information
- Nationality: Iranian
- Born: 16 September 1958 (age 66)

Sport
- Sport: Weightlifting

Abdollah Fatemi Rika (Persian: عبدالله فاطمی ریکا, born 16 September 1958) is an Iranian former weightlifter. He competed in the men's heavyweight I event at the 1992 Summer Olympics.
