= Cook Islands at the Olympics =

- Flag of the Cook Islands
- IOC code: COK
- NOC: Cook Islands Sports and National Olympic Committee
- Website: www.oceaniasport.com/cookis
- Medals: Gold 0 Silver 0 Bronze 0 Total 0

Summer appearances
- 1988; 1992; 1996; 2000; 2004; 2008; 2012; 2016; 2020; 2024

The Cook Islands has competed in 10 Summer Olympic Games since its debut in 1988. The nation has never competed in the Winter Olympic Games and has yet to win a medal as of 2024.

The Cook Islands is the only one of the associated territories of New Zealand to compete at the Olympic Games. Niue and Tokelau having not yet done so as of 2024.

== Medal tables ==
=== Medals by Summer Games ===
Games	Athletes	Gold	Silver	Bronze	Total	Rank
1988 Seoul	7	0	0	0	0	–
1992 Barcelona	2	0	0	0	0	–
1996 Atlanta	3	0	0	0	0	–
2000 Sydney	3	0	0	0	0	–
2004 Athens	3	0	0	0	0	–
2008 Beijing	4	0	0	0	0	–
2012 London	8	0	0	0	0	–
2016 Rio de Janeiro	9	0	0	0	0	–
2020 Tokyo	6	0	0	0	0	–
2024 Paris	2	0	0	0	0	–
2028 Los Angeles	future event					
2032 Brisbane	future event					
Total		0	0	0	0	–

== See also ==
- List of flag bearers for the Cook Islands at the Olympics
- List of participating nations at the Summer Olympic Games
- List of participating nations at the Winter Olympic Games
