= Andrei Denisov (weightlifter) =

Israeli weightlifter (born 1963)

Personal information
- Native name: אנדריי דניסוב
- Born: June 3, 1963 (age 61)
- Weight: 209 lb (95 kg)

Sport
- Country: Israel
- Sport: Weightlifting
- Updated on 23 August 2016

Andrei Denisov (Hebrew: אנדריי דניסוב; born June 3, 1963) is an Israeli Olympic weightlifter.

Denisov is Jewish. When he competed in the Olympics, he weighed 209 pounds (95 kg).

Denisov competed for Israel at the 1992 Summer Olympics at the age of 29 in Barcelona, Spain, in Weightlifting—Men's Heavyweight (100 kg), and came in 6th, lifting 377.5 kg. He lifted 386 pounds (175 kg) in the snatch, and 446 pounds (202 kg) in the clean and jerk, coming short of a medal by 50 pounds (23 kg).
