= Kim Lynge Pedersen =

Danish weightlifter

Personal information
- Nationality: Danish
- Born: 3 April 1965 (age 59); Hirtshals, Denmark

Sport
- Sport: Weightlifting

Kim Lynge Pedersen (born 3 April 1965) is a Danish weightlifter. He competed in the men's heavyweight I event at the 1992 Summer Olympics.
