= Taua Henry =

Cook Islands sailor

Personal information
- Born: Peter Taua Elisa Henry; 14 August 1990 (age 35)
- Height: 1.70 m (5 ft 7 in)
- Weight: 82 kg (181 lb)

Sport
- Country: Cook Islands
- Sport: Sailing
- Event: Laser
Medal record
Men's Sailing
Representing Cook Islands
Pacific Games
Silver medal – second place	2011 Nouméa	Laser Team
Bronze medal – third place	2015 Port Moresby	Laser Team
- Updated on 24 August 2016

Peter Taua Henry (born 14 August 1990) is a Cook Islands sailor who competed at the 2016 Summer Olympics.

== Sailing career ==
Henry first traveled overseas for an international competition in 2007. He finished 23rd at the 2015 ISAF Sailing World Cup in Melbourne to qualify for the Olympics.

Henry competed for the Cook Islands at the 2016 Summer Olympics in the Laser class.
