= Petr Krol =

Czech weightlifter

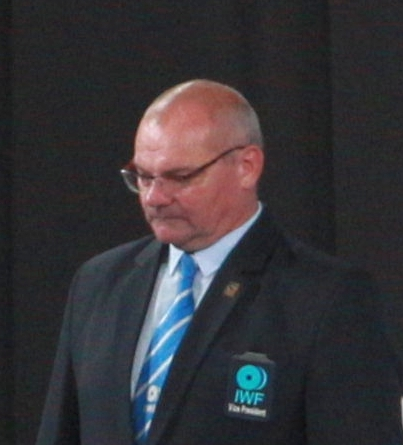

Personal information
- Nationality: Czech
- Born: 14 July 1965 (age 59); Ostrava, Czechoslovakia

Sport
- Sport: Weightlifting

Petr Krol (born 14 July 1965) is a Czech weightlifter. He competed in the men's heavyweight I event at the 1992 Summer Olympics.
