= Petero Okotai =

Cook Islands swimmer (born 1981)

Personal information
- Full name: Petero James Moeava Okotai
- Nationality: Cook Islands
- Born: 3 August 1981 (age 45)

Sport
- Sport: Swimming
- Strokes: Freestyle

Petero James Moeava Okotai (born 3 August 1981) is a Cook Islands swimmer.

He grew up in Papua New Guinea where he began swimming at the age of 5, then stopped upon returning to the Cook Islands at the age of 11, due to the absence of a pool. He resumed swimming in 2006, while studying for an honours degree in business management at the University of Auckland, in New Zealand, which he completed in 2010.

He competed in the 50 metre freestyle event at the 2007 World Aquatics Championships in Melbourne, and finished 157th out of 175, with a time of 29.54.

He represented his country at the 2008 Summer Olympics in Beijing, competing in the men's 100 metre breaststroke event.

With no Olympic-sized pool to train in, Okotai initially practiced by swimming in a lagoon, where he had to "deal with the hazards of trigger fish, coral heads and ocean currents". He later trained in the Muri Beach Club Hotel pool on Rarotonga. The pool measured 17 metres, and Okotai had to swim among tourists.

He finished third and last in heat 1, his time of 1:20.20 the slowest of all competitors who finished the race, and almost eight seconds slower than second-slowest Mohammed Al-Habsi, of Oman. This prompted Okotai to comment: "I hope I'm not Eric the Eel."
