= Weightlifting at the 1992 Summer Olympics – Men's 100 kg =

Weightlifting at the Olympics

Men's 100 kg at the Games of the XXV Olympiad
- Venue: Pavelló de l'Espanya Industrial
- Date: 2 August 1992
- Competitors: 25 from 21 nations
- Winning total: 410.0 kg

Medalists
| 1st place, gold medalist(s) | | Viktor Tregubov | Unified Team |
| 2nd place, silver medalist(s) | | Tymur Taimazov | Unified Team |
| 3rd place, bronze medalist(s) | | Waldemar Malak | Poland |

The Men's First-heavyweight Weightlifting Event (– 100 kg) is the third heaviest men's event at the weightlifting competition, limiting competitors to a maximum of 100.0 kilograms of body mass. The competition took place on 2 August in the Pavelló de l'Espanya Industrial.

Each lifter performed in both the snatch and clean and jerk lifts, with the final score being the sum of the lifter's best result in each. The athlete received three attempts in each of the two lifts; the score for the lift was the heaviest weight successfully lifted. Ties were broken by the lifter with the lightest body weight.

== Results ==
| Rank | Name | Body Weight | Snatch (kg) | | | Clean & Jerk (kg) | | | Total (kg) |
| Rank | Name | Body Weight | 1 | 2 | 3 | 1 | 2 | 3 | Total (kg) |
|---|---|---|---|---|---|---|---|---|---|
| 1st place, gold medalist(s) | Viktor Tregubov (EUN) | 97.25 | 177.5 | 185.0 | 190.0 =OR | 215.0 | ~~220.0~~ | 220.0 | 410.0 |
| 2nd place, silver medalist(s) | Timur Taymazov (EUN) | 99.80 | 180.0 | 185.0 | ~~190.0~~ | 217.5 | ~~227.5~~ | ~~227.5~~ | 402.5 |
| 3rd place, bronze medalist(s) | Waldemar Malak (POL) | 99.55 | 180.0 | 182.5 | 185.0 | 212.5 | ~~215.0~~ | 215.0 | 400.0 |
| 4 | Francis Tournefier (FRA) | 99.25 | ~~170.0~~ | 170.0 | ~~172.5~~ | 217.5 | ~~222.5~~ | ~~222.5~~ | 387.5 |
| 5 | Petar Stefanov (BUL) | 98.85 | ~~165.0~~ | 165.0 | 170.0 | 205.0 | 210.0 | ~~212.5~~ | 380.0 |
| 6 | Andrei Denisov (ISR) | 95.40 | 170.0 | 175.0 | ~~177.5~~ | 202.5 | ~~210.0~~ | ~~210.0~~ | 377.5 |
| 7 | Udo Guse (GER) | 99.05 | 162.5 | 167.5 | ~~170.0~~ | 205.0 | 210.0 | ~~212.5~~ | 377.5 |
| 8 | Yoshimitsu Nishimoto (JPN) | 98.0 | 160.0 | 165.0 | ~~167.5~~ | 200.0 | 207.5 | ~~212.5~~ | 372.5 |
| 9 | Nazar Kadir (IRQ) | 95.05 | 160.0 | 167.5 | 170.0 | 200.0 | ~~205.0~~ | ~~205.0~~ | 370.0 |
| 10 | Bijan Rezaei (SWE) | 97.90 | 155.0 | 160.0 | 165.0 | 200.0 | ~~207.5~~ | ~~207.5~~ | 365.0 |
| 11 | Denis Garon (CAN) | 98.65 | 155.0 | ~~160.0~~ | ~~160.0~~ | 200.0 | 210.0 | ~~212.5~~ | 365.0 |
| 12 | Petr Krol (TCH) | 98.35 | 157.5 | 162.5 | ~~167.5~~ | 192.5 | ~~200.0~~ | 200.0 | 362.5 |
| 13 | Jeong Dae-jin (KOR) | 99.05 | ~~155.0~~ | 155.0 | 160.0 | 202.5 | - | - | 362.5 |
| 14 | Jaroslav Jokeľ (TCH) | 97.80 | 152.5 | 157.5 | 162.5 | 185.0 | 192.5 | ~~200.0~~ | 355.0 |
| 15 | Wes Barnett (USA) | 99.25 | 152.5 | 157.5 | ~~160.0~~ | 195.0 | ~~200.0~~ | ~~200.0~~ | 352.5 |
| 16 | Choi Dong-gil (KOR) | 97.05 | 150.0 | 155.0 | 160.0 | 185.0 | - | - | 345.0 |
| 17 | Abdollah Fatemi Rika (IRI) | 97.70 | 150.0 | ~~155.0~~ | ~~155.0~~ | 180.0 | 190.0 | ~~195.0~~ | 340.0 |
| 18 | Emilson Dantas (BRA) | 97.80 | ~~145.0~~ | 145.0 | 150.0 | 180.0 | ~~190.0~~ | 190.0 | 340.0 |
| 19 | Kim Lynge Pedersen (DEN) | 96.10 | 150.0 | ~~155.0~~ | ~~155.0~~ | 185.0 | ~~190.0~~ | ~~190.0~~ | 335.0 |
| 20 | Jeremiah Wallwork (SAM) | 95.80 | ~~125.0~~ | 125.0 | 130.0 | 152.5 | 160.0 | ~~165.0~~ | 290.0 |
| 21 | Redha Shaaban (KUW) | 94.55 | ~~110.0~~ | ~~110.0~~ | 110.0 | 140.0 | ~~145.0~~ | ~~145.0~~ | 250.0 |
| - | Panagiotis Drakopoulos (GRE) | 99.75 | 162.5 | ~~167.5~~ | 167.5 | ~~202.5~~ | ~~202.5~~ | ~~202.5~~ | DNF |
| - | Andor Szanyi (HUN) | 98.75 | 175.0 | ~~180.0~~ | ~~180.0~~ | ~~215.0~~ | ~~215.0~~ | ~~215.0~~ | DNF |
| - | Sam Nunuke Pera (COK) | 92.60 | ~~105.0~~ | ~~105.0~~ | ~~105.0~~ | - | - | - | DNF |
| - | David Langon (USA) | 97.40 | ~~150.0~~ | ~~150.0~~ | ~~150.0~~ | - | - | - | DNF |
