= Cook Islands at the 2011 World Championships in Athletics =

- WA code: COK
- National federation: Athletics Cook Islands Inc.
- Website: www.sportingpulse.com/assoc_page.cgi?c=2-1090-0-0-0

in Daegu
- Competitors: 1
- Medals: Gold 0 Silver 0 Bronze 0 Total 0

World Championships in Athletics appearances
- 1983; 1987; 1991; 1993; 1995; 1997; 1999; 2001; 2003; 2005; 2007; 2009; 2011; 2013; 2015; 2017; 2019; 2022; 2023; 2025

The Cook Islands competed at the 2011 World Championships in Athletics from August 27 to September 4 in Daegu, South Korea.

One athlete was announced to represent the country in the event.

== Results ==
=== Women ===
Athlete	Event	Preliminaries		Heats		Semifinals		Final	
Athlete	Event	Time Width Height	Rank	Time Width Height	Rank	Time Width Height	Rank	Time Width Height	Rank
Patricia Taea	100 metres	12.27 Q, SB	8	12.62	54	Did not advance			
