= Helema Williams =

Cook Islands sailor

Personal information
- Nationality: Cook Islands
- Born: 11 October 1991 (age 34) Tauhunu, Cook Islands
- Height: 168 cm (5.51 ft)
- Weight: 79 kg (174 lb)

Sport
- Sport: Sailing
- Event: Laser Radial
Medal record
Women's sailing
Representing Cook Islands
Pacific Games
Gold medal – first place	2011 Nouméa	Laser Radial
Gold medal – first place	2011 Nouméa	Laser Radial Team
Gold medal – first place	2015 Port Moresby	Laser Radial
Gold medal – first place	2015 Port Moresby	Laser Radial Team
- Updated on 24 August 2016

Helema Williams (born 11 October 1991 in Tauhunu, Cook Islands) is a Cook Islander sailor. She competed at the 2012 Summer Olympics in the Laser Radial class event where she finished last. She was the flag bearer for the Cook Islands during the opening ceremony.

Olympic Games
Preceded by Sam Pera Junior	Flagbearer for Cook Islands; London 2012	Succeeded by Ella Nicholas
