= Sailing at the 2011 Pacific Games =

- Location: Nouméa, New Caledonia
- Dates: 29 August–9 September 2011

Sailing at the 2011 Pacific Games in Nouméa, New Caledonia was held on August 29–September 9, 2011.

== Medal summary ==
=== Medal table ===
Rank	Nation	Gold	Silver	Bronze	Total
1	New Caledonia	2	3	2	7
2	Cook Islands	2	2	0	4
3	French Polynesia (TAH)	2	0	1	3
4	Fiji	0	1	1	2
5	Samoa	0	0	2	2
Totals (5 entries)		6	6	6	18

=== Results ===
Event	Gold	Silver	Bronze
Hobie Cat pair	Teiva Véronique; Jennifer Delattre; Tahiti	Jérôme Le Gal; Remy Desbordes; New Caledonia	Shane Brodie; Taleilisi Brodie; Fiji
Hobie Cat team	Teiva Véronique; Jennifer Delattre; Teva Le Calvic; Arnaud Teva Bourdelon; Tahiti	Shane Brodie; Taleilisi Brodie; John Philp; Charlotte Dugdale; Fiji	Rémy Desbordes; Jérôme Le Gal; Enrick Obert; Titouan Galea; New Caledonia
Men's Laser single	Malo Leseigneur; New Caledonia	Mathieu Frei; New Caledonia	Jessee Besson; Tahiti
Men's Laser team	Malo Leseigneur; Mathieu Frei; New Caledonia	Peter Elisa Henry; Grand Junior David Charlie Poiri; Cook Islands	Eroni Leilua; Myka Stanley; Samoa
Women's Laser single	Helema Williams; Cook Islands	Teau McKenzie; Cook Islands	Priscilla Poaniewa; New Caledonia
Women's Laser team	Helema Williams; Teau McKenzie; Cook Islands	Priscilla Poaniewa; Gaela Marchal Piriou; New Caledonia	Valerie Humrich; Aloma Black; Samoa
