= Teau McKenzie =

Cook Island sailor

Personal information
- Born: Teau Moana McKenzie; 12 March 1995 (age 31) Cook Islands
- Height: 1.83 m (6 ft 0 in)
- Weight: 67 kg (148 lb)

Sport
- Country: Cook Islands
- Sport: Sailing
- College team: Westlake Girls
- Club: Rarotonga Sailing Club
Medal record
Women's Sailing
Representing Cook Islands
Pacific Games
| Gold medal – first place | 2011 Nouméa | Laser Radial Team |
| Gold medal – first place | 2015 Port Moresby | Laser Radial Team |
| Silver medal – second place | 2011 Nouméa | Laser Radial |
| Silver medal – second place | 2015 Port Moresby | Laser Radial |

Teau Moana McKenzie (born 12 March 1995) is a Cook Islands competitive sailor.

She competed at the 2016 Summer Olympics in Rio de Janeiro, in the women's Laser Radial, where she finished in 35th place.

== Outside sports ==
McKenzie represented Cook Islands in the Miss Grand International 2018 contest.
