= Gordon Heather =

Cook Island sprinter

Gordon Teokotai Heather (born 14 May 1990) is a male track and field sprint athlete who competes internationally for the Cook Islands.

Heather represented the Cook Islands at the 2008 Summer Olympics in Beijing. He competed at the 100 metres sprint and placed 8th in his heat without advancing to the second round. He ran the distance in a personal best time of 11.41 seconds.
