= Kohl Horton =

Cook Island canoeist

Personal information
- Nationality: Cook Island
- Born: 4 May 2004 (age 20)

Sport
- Sport: Canoe sprint

Kohl Horton (born 4 May 2004) is a Cook Island canoeist. He competed in the men's K-1 1000 metres event at the 2020 Summer Olympics.
