= List of Cook Islands records in athletics =

The following are the national records in athletics in the Cook Islands maintained by the Cook Island's national athletics federation: Athletics Cook Islands (ACI).

== Outdoor ==
Key to tables: Awaiting ratification Record not kept by ACI Not ratified or later rescinded by ACI

=== Men ===
Event	Record	Athlete	Date	Meet	Place	Ref.
100 m	10.97	Mark Sherwin	4 December 1993		Brisbane, Australia	
100 m	10.6 h	Mark Sherwin	19 November 1993		Brisbane, Australia	
200 m	22.46 (+0.8 m/s)	Teinakore Teiti	25 August 2000	Oceania Championships	Adelaide, Australia	
200 m	22.1 h	Alex Beddoes	13 October 2020		Nikao, Cook Islands	
400 m	49.19	Alex Beddoes	1 March 2019		Melbourne, Australia	
800 m	1:47.26	Alex Beddoes	30 July 2021	Olympic Games	Tokyo, Japan	
1000 m	3:20.05 (Note: record set during octathlon competition)	Harmon Harmon	15 December 2006	Oceania Championships	Apia, Samoa	
1500 m	3:56.88	Alex Beddoes	30 November 2023	Pacific Games	Honiara, Solomon Islands	
Mile	5:07.1 h	Alan Jordon	1960			
2000 m	6:23.3 h	Moetu Tangitamaita	3 May 1995		Tereora, Cook Islands	
3000 m	9:39.3 h	Muriaroa Ngaro	1979		Rarotonga, Cook Islands	
5000 m	16:41.7 h	Jubilee Reu	12 June 1971		Avarua, Cook Islands	
10,000 m	35:23.0 h	Muriaroa Ngaro	30 August 1979	South Pacific Games	Suva, Fiji	
Half marathon	1:24:10	Andrew Logan	6 July 2024	Oceania Half Marathon Championships	Gold Coast, Australia	
Marathon	2:51:26	Muriaroa Ngaro	3 May 1980		Avarua, Cook Islands	
110 m hurdles	16.44	Akanoa William	15 December 1987	South Pacific Games	Nouméa, New Caledonia	
400 m hurdles	1:31.07	Casper Mateariki	25 October 2004		Rarotonga, Cook Islands	
3000 m steeplechase	10:51.71	Uaongo Areai	3 August 1985	South Pacific Mini Games	Avarua, Cook Islands	
High jump	1.89 m	Turuariki George Baxter	25 September 2009	Pacific Mini Games	Nikao, Cook Islands	
High jump	1.98 m	Samasoni Hewitt (Note: NZL until 2 March 2025; eligible to represent COK in National Representative Competitions from 3 March 2025)	8 March 2025	New Zealand Championships	Dunedin, New Zealand	
Pole vault	3.10 m	Akanoa William	18 December 1987	South Pacific Games	Nouméa, New Caledonia	
Long jump	7.16 m	Harmon Harmon	2 June 2003		Tereora, Cook Islands	
Triple jump	13.63 m	Harmon Harmon	16 October 2001		Tereora, Cook Islands	
Shot put	13.85 m	Mau George	25 September 2009	Pacific Mini Games	Nikao, Cook Islands	
Discus throw	44.96 m	Robert McNabb	14 February 1999		Brisbane, Australia	
Hammer throw	48.92 m	Vainga Tonga	5 June 1995		Avarua, Cook Islands	
Javelin throw	57.18 m	Daniel Tutai	24 September 2009	Pacific Mini Games	Nikao, Cook Islands	
Decathlon	5244 pts	Akanoa William	17–18 December 1987	South Pacific Games	Nouméa, New Caledonia	
Decathlon	100m / Long jump / Shot put / High jump / 400m / 110m H / Discus / Pole vault / Javelin / 1500m; 12.01 / 6.37 m / 9.18 m / 1.67 m / 53.55 / 16.95 / 27.68 m / 3.10 m / 43.30 m / 5:31.19					
3000 m walk (track)	15:56.0 h	Uaongo Areai	July 1985		Tereora, Cook Islands	
10 km walk (road)	57:27.0+	Uaongo Areai	1 May 1980		Avarua, Cook Islands	
20 km walk (road)	1:52:33	Uaongo Areai	1 May 1980		Avarua, Cook Islands	
50 km walk (road)	5:37:31	Uaongo Areai	June 1980		Okato, New Zealand	
4 × 100 m relay	44.80	Cook Islands; Teokotai Simiona; Tenoa Puna; Michael Tinirau; Victor Ioane	2 August 1985	South Pacific Mini Games	Avarua, Cook Islands	
4 × 100 m relay	44.17	Cook Islands; Piritau Nga; Daniel Tolosa; Edward Nga; Max Teuruaa	8 March 2025	New Zealand Championships	Dunedin, New Zealand	
4 × 400 m relay	3:28.74	Cook Islands; Daniel Tolosa; Rupeni Mataitonga; Max Teuruaa; Alex Beddoes	30 November 2023	Pacific Games	Honiara, Solomon Islands	

=== Women ===
Event	Record	Athlete	Date	Meet	Place	Ref.
100 m	11.97 (+1.5 m/s)	Patricia Taea	3 December 2017		Brisbane, Australia	
200 m	24.16 (+0.3 m/s)	Patricia Taea	14 December 2017	Pacific Mini Games	Port Vila, Vanuatu	
400 m	1:01.65	Attina Sawtell	13 September 1983	South Pacific Games	Apia, Western Samoa	
400 m	1:00.4 h	Attina Sawtell	12 September 1983	South Pacific Games	Apia, Western Samoa	
400 m	59.41	Patricia Taea	5 November 2016		Brisbane, Australia	
800 m	2:17.06	Attina Sawtell	3 August 1985	South Pacific Mini Games	Avarua, Cook Islands	
1000 m	3:14.8 h	Akakoromaki Matepi	30 June 1979		Mangaia, Cook Islands	
1500 m	4:49.21	Attina Sawtell	9 August 1985	South Pacific Mini Games	Avarua, Cook Islands	
3000 m	11:06.03	Akakoromaki Matepi	1 September 1979	South Pacific Games	Suva, Fiji	
5000 m	20:57.39	Serena Francis	12 December 2001	South Pacific Mini Games	Middlegate, Norfolk Island	
10,000 m						
Half marathon	1:51:31	Lily Ngaata	21 October 1984		Avarua, Cook Islands	
Marathon	3:32:33	Kiki Atonia	3 May 1980		Avarua, Cook Islands	
100 m hurdles	16.54	Suzanne Estall	10 March 1988		Hamilton, New Zealand	
400 m hurdles						
2000 m steeplechase	9:00.2 h	Jennie George	2010		Pirae, French Polynesia	
3000 m steeplechase						
High jump	1.67 m	Vicki Keil	3 June 1991		Avarua, Cook Islands	
Pole vault						
Long jump	5.37 m	Erin Tierney	23 June 1988		Dunedin, New Zealand	
Triple jump	10.73 m	Erin Tierney	24 June 1993		Suva, Fiji	
Shot put	14.96 m	Tereapii Tapoki	11 October 2006		Rarotonga, Cook Islands	
Discus throw	57.61 m	Tereapii Tapoki	11 November 2006		Auckland, New Zealand	
Hammer throw	46.70 m	Siniva Marsters	22 May 2001		Nikao, Cook Islands	
Hammer throw	48.47 m (Note: mark was obtained using an oversize circle)	Siniva Marsters	2 June 2003		Tereora, Cook Islands	
Javelin throw	46.23 m	Judy Tuara	9 December 2006		Christchurch, New Zealand	
Heptathlon	3333 pts	Maki Samantha Lockington	24–25 September 2009	Pacific Mini Games	Nikao, Cook Islands	
Heptathlon	100m H / High jump / Shot put / 200m / Long jump / Javelin / 800m; 19.30 (+1.2 m/s) / 1.35 m / 9.92 m / 28.08 (+1.3 m/s) / 4.88 m (+1.3 m/s) / 32.73 m / 3:06.63					
20 km walk (road)						
4 × 100 m relay	53.86	Cook Islands; Erin Tierney; Julia Tipokoroa; Tangianau Vogel; Kura Drollet	9 August 1985	South Pacific Mini Games	Avarua, Cook Islands	
4 × 100 m relay	53.6 h		12 October 2020		Nikao, Cook Islands	
4 × 400 m relay	4:21.72	Cook Islands; Attina Sawtell; Erin Tierney; Lily Ngaata; Tangianau Vogel	9 August 1985	South Pacific Mini Games	Avarua, Cook Islands	

== Indoor ==
=== Men ===
Event	Record	Athlete	Date	Meet	Place	Ref.
60 m	7.12	Daniel Tolosa	21 March 2025	World Championships	Nanjing, China	
200 m						
400 m						
800 m						
1500 m						
3000 m						
60 m hurdles						
High jump						
Pole vault						
Long jump						
Triple jump						
Shot put						
Heptathlon						
Heptathlon	60m / Long jump / Shot put / High jump / 60m H / Pole vault / 1000m					
5000 m walk						
4 × 400 m relay						

=== Women ===
Event	Record	Athlete	Date	Meet	Place	Ref.
60 m	7.90	Patricia Taea	2 March 2018	World Championships	Birmingham, United Kingdom	
200 m						
400 m						
800 m						
1500 m						
3000 m						
60 m hurdles						
High jump						
Pole vault						
Long jump						
Triple jump						
Shot put	13.39 m	Tereapii O Jean Ki Nz Tapoki	20 September 2017	Asian Indoor and Martial Arts Games	Ashgabat, Turkmenistan	
Pentathlon						
Pentathlon	60m H / High jump / Shot put / Long jump / 800m					
3000 m walk						
4 × 400 m relay						
