= Shayne Brodie =

Fijian sailor

Personal information
- Nationality: Fijian
- Born: 30 May 1973 (age 52)

Sport
- Sport: Sailing

Shayne Brodie (born 30 May 1973) is a Fijian sailor. He competed in the Tornado event at the 1996 Summer Olympics.
