= Sam Pera Jr. =

Cook Islands weightlifter

Personal information
- Full name: Samuel Raphael Pera
- Born: 11 March 1989 (age 37) Rarotonga, Cook Islands
- Weight: 123 kg (271 lb)

Sport
- Country: Cook Islands
- Sport: Weightlifting Rugby League
- Weight class: +105 kg
Medal record
Oceania Weightlifting Championships
Bronze medal – third place	2008 Auckland	+105 kg

Samuel Raphael Pera Junior (born 11 March 1989) is a weightlifter from the Cook Islands, competing in the +105 kg category. He was born in Rarotonga.

He is the son of weightlifter Sam Nunuku Pera, who represented the Cook Islands at the Summer Olympics in 1992, 1996, 2000, and 2004. At the 2006 Commonwealth Games he competed against his father in the 105 kg category, and won with 293 kg to 281 kg, ranking 9th.

Sam Pera Junior ranked 32nd at the 2007 World Championships, with a total of 330 kg.

He won the bronze medal at the 2008 Oceania Senior Championships, with a total of 335 kg.

At the 2008 Junior World Championships he ranked 13th, with a total of 340 kg.

He is representing the Cook Islands at the 2008 Summer Olympics, competing in the +105 kg division. He served as the Cook Islands flag-bearer in the 2008 Summer Olympics.

== Major results ==
Year	Venue	Weight	Snatch (kg)				Clean & Jerk (kg)				Total	Rank
Year	Venue	Weight	1	2	3	Rank	1	2	3	Rank	Total	Rank
World Championships
2007	Chiang Mai, Thailand	+105 kg	140	145	~~150~~	33	170	180	185	31	330	32
Pacific Games
2011	Nouméa, New Caledonia	+105 kg	?	?	?	---	?	?	?	---	350	2nd place, silver medalist(s)
