= Athletics Cook Islands =

Sports governing body in the Cook Islands

Athletics Cook Islands Inc.
- Sport: Athletics
- Jurisdiction: Incorporated Society
- Abbreviation: ACI
- Founded: 1962
- Affiliation: IAAF
- Affiliation date: 1966
- Regional affiliation: OAA
- Headquarters: Nikao, Rarotonga
- President: Erin Tierney
- Vice president: Thomas Henderson
- Secretary: Ruth Tangiaau Mave
- Replaced: Cook Islands Amateur Athletics Association
- (Cook Islands)

Athletics Cook Islands Inc. (ACI) is the governing body for the sport of athletics in the Cook Islands.

== History ==
ACI was founded as Cook Islands Amateur Athletics Association by Percy Henderson in 1962, and was affiliated to the IAAF in the year 1966. In 1979, Hugh Ngamata Henry was elected president. Later, Anne Tierney served as president.

Current president is Erin Tierney.

== Affiliations ==
- International Association of Athletics Federations (IAAF)
- Oceania Athletics Association (OAA)

Moreover, it is part of the following national organisations:

- Cook Islands Sports and National Olympic Committee (CISNOC)

== National records ==
ACI maintains the Cook Islands records in athletics.
