= Bryden Nicholas =

New Zealand-Cook Islander canoeist

Personal information
- Born: 10 March 1989 (age 37) Tauranga, New Zealand
- Height: 1.70 m (5 ft 7 in)
- Weight: 70 kg (154 lb)

Sport
- Country: New Zealand, Cook Islands
- Sport: Canoe slalom
- Event: C2, K1

Bryden Nicholas (born 10 March 1989 in Tauranga) is a New Zealand-Cook Islander slalom canoeist who has competed at the international level since 2005.

He finished in 21st place in the K1 event at the 2016 Summer Olympics in Rio de Janeiro.

He represented New Zealand until 2010. Since 2011 he has been representing Cook Islands like his sister Ella.

== World Cup individual podiums ==
Season	Date	Venue	Position	Event
2006	26 Feb 2006	Mangahao	2nd	C2^{1}

^{1} Oceania Championship counting for World Cup points
