= Ella Nicholas =

Cook Islander canoeist

Personal information
- Born: 15 December 1990 (age 34); Tauranga, New Zealand
- Height: 1.60 m (5 ft 3 in)
- Weight: 62 kg (137 lb)

Sport
- Country: Cook Islands
- Sport: Canoeing
- Event: K-1

Ella Nicholas (born 15 December 1990 in Tauranga, New Zealand) is a Cook Islands slalom canoeist who has competed since 2007.

At the 2012 Summer Olympics in London she took part in the K1 event, finishing 18th in the heats, failing to qualify for the semifinals.

At the 2016 Summer Olympics in Rio de Janeiro, she finished 18th in the heats of the K1 event and did not qualify for the semifinals. She was the flag bearer for the Cook Islands during the Parade of Nations.

Her brother Bryden also represented Cook Islands at the 2016 Summer Olympics in canoe slalom. Her sister Jane Nicholas has qualified to Represent the Cook Islands at the delayed 2020 Tokyo Olympics.

Olympic Games
Preceded by Helema Williams	Flagbearer for Cook Islands; Rio de Janeiro 2016	Succeeded by Incumbent
