= Nikao =

Village on Rarotonga, Cook Islands

Coordinates: 21°12′35.21″S 159°49′10.78″W

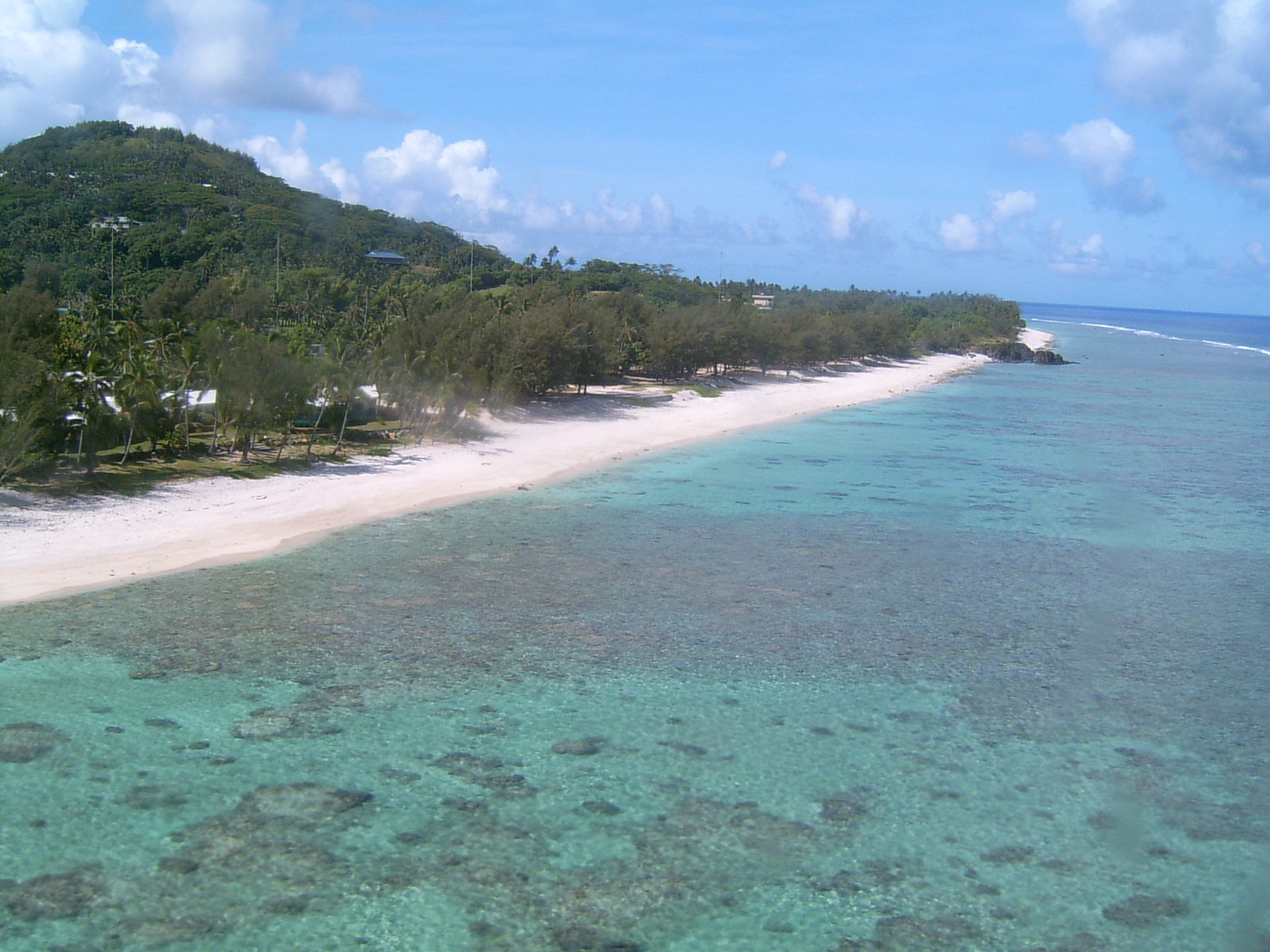
Nikao beach with Black Rock in the distance.

Nikao is a village settlement on Rarotonga in the Cook Islands. It is in the western part of Avarua district, on the northern coast.

Nikao is the location of Rarotonga International Airport, the Cook Islands Parliament building, Tereora College and the Avarua Tereora Stadium (the oldest secondary school), a modern Cook Islands Christian Church and the first division football team Nikao Sokattak F.C. Nikao originally consisted of three tapere or settlements (Rangiura, Turamatuitui and Pokoinu). Most of the people of Pokoinu lived near the sea, but after extensions were made to the airport, the people were moved inland towards the mountain. Today they call that new tapere, "Tepuka". The new village of Nikao has three new tapere (Panama, Atupa and Tepuka). Black Rock (Tuoro), where in oral tradition the spirits of the dead are believed to depart for Avaiki, is at Nikao beach, across the road from the Rarotonga Golf Club.
