= Tikove Piira =

Cook Island sprinter

Personal information
- Born: 1 April 2000 (age 26)

Sport
- Country: Cook Islands
- Sport: Track and field
- Event: Sprinting

Achievements and titles
- Personal best(s): 11.52s (100 m); 22.95s (200 m)

Tikove Piira (born 1 April 2000) is a sprinter competing for the Cook Islands. He competed in the men's 100 metres event at the 2019 World Athletics Championships in Doha, Qatar. He competed in the preliminary round and he did not advance to compete in the heats.

Piira is from Pukapuka and was educated at Tereora College. He works as a police officer.
