= Mark Sherwin =

Cook Island sprinter

Mark Sherwin (born 22 January 1970 in Adelaide, Australia) is a former sprint athlete, who competed for the Cook Islands.

Sherwin competed in two different Olympics, firstly at the 1992 Summer Olympics he competed in the 100 metres, where he ran a time in 11.53 seconds and finished 8th in his heat, so not qualifying for the next round, he didn't do much better four years later at the 1996 Summer Olympics and ran the 100 metres in 11.41 seconds but still finished last in his heat.

In 2012 he was the general team manager for the Cook Islands at the 2014 Commonwealth Games.
