= Turia Vogel =

Cook Islands windsurfer

Turia Vogel (born September 1, 1969) is a sailor who competes for the Cook Islands in windsurf events.

Vogel competed at the 1996 Summer Olympics and 2000 Summer Olympics, she competed in the Mistral One Design both times, in 1996 she finished 22nd and four years later 20th.
