= Lanihei Connolly =

Cook Islands swimmer

Personal information
- Full name: Mary Lanihei Connolly
- Nickname: Lani
- Born: 30 December 2005 (age 20) Mauke, Cook Islands

Sport
- Country: Cook Islands
- Sport: Swimming
- Event: Breaststroke
Medal record
Women's swimming
Representing the Cook Islands
Pacific Games
Gold medal – first place	2023 Honiara	50 m breaststroke
Silver medal – second place	2023 Honiara	100 m breaststroke

Mary Lanihei Connolly (born 30 December 2005) is a competitive swimmer from Mauke, Cook Islands. She specialises in breaststroke, and has represented her country at the 2022 Commonwealth Games, the 2023 Pacific Games, and the 2024 Summer Olympics. She won gold and silver medals in the 50 and 100 metre events, respectively, at the 2023 Pacific Games in Honiara.

== Background ==
Connolly was born on the island of Mauke, and is of Cook Islands, Ngāti Porou and Te Whānau-ā-Apanui descent. She grew up in New Zealand and attended the Baradene College of the Sacred Heart in Auckland.

She then became a student at Bond University in Gold Coast, Queensland. She studies biomedical science, and has joined a World Aquatics programme for the development of Oceanic swimmers. Her family has a sporting background as her mother represented the Cook Islands in athletics, and her cousin Zac Payne was a men's 50 metre freestyle swimmer at the 2012 Summer Olympics in London.

== Commonwealth Games and Pacific Games ==
Connolly represented the Cook Islands at the 2022 Commonwealth Games in Birmingham, England.

At the 2023 Pacific Games in Honiara, she won gold in the 50 metres breaststroke and silver in the 100 metres breaststroke.

== 2024 Olympics ==
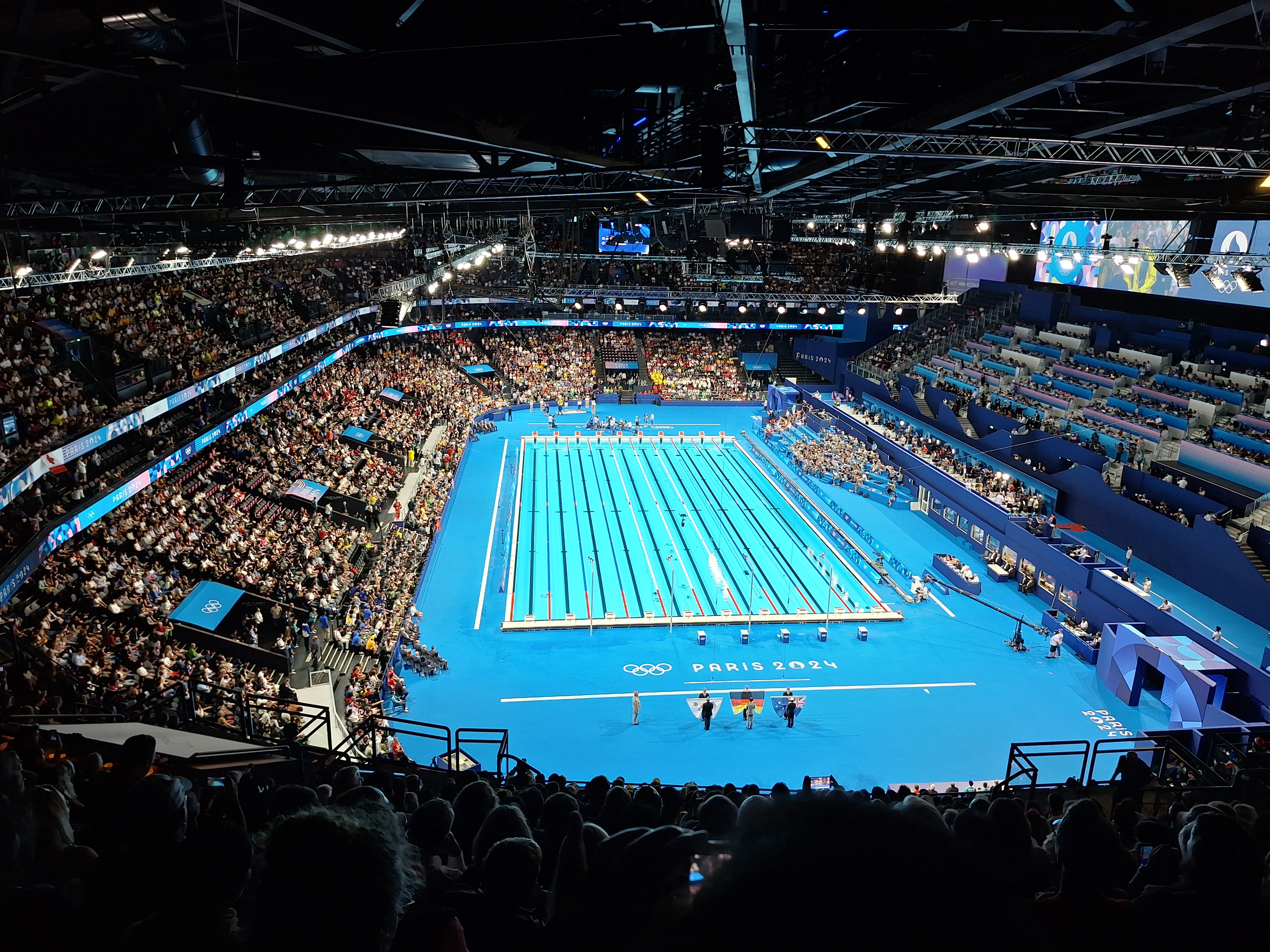
The Paris La Défense Arena, where Connolly's swimming event took place.

The Cook Islands sent just two athletes, Connolly and 800 metres runner Alex Beddoes, to the 2024 Summer Olympics in Paris. They were, jointly, the Cook Islands flagbearers at the opening ceremony. Beddoes had to withdraw from the Games due to injury, and Connolly was the sole flagbearer at the closing ceremony.

Connolly competed in Paris after receiving a universality spot for the women's 100 metres breaststroke. It was her debut appearance at the Olympics. On 28 July 2024, she participated in heat two, but finished last out of eight in a time of 1:10.45, which was 3.18 seconds behind the winner, and so she did not qualify for the semi-finals.
