= Kirsten Fisher-Marsters =

Cook Islands swimmer

Personal information
- Full name: Kirsten Andrea Fisher-Marsters
- Nationality: Cook Islands
- Born: 11 February 1998 (age 28) Auckland, New Zealand

Sport
- Sport: Swimming

Kirsten Andrea Fisher-Marsters (born 11 February 1998) is a Cook Islands swimmer. She competed in the women's 100 metre breaststroke at the 2020 Summer Olympics.

Born in New Zealand, she is able to represent the Cook Islands through her father.
