= Alex Beddoes =

New Zealand-born Cook Island track and field athlete

Personal information
- Born: 9 July 1995 (age 31) Rotorua, New Zealand
- Height: 1.81 m (5 ft 11 in)
- Weight: 74 kg (163 lb)

Sport
- Country: Cook Islands
- Sport: Athletics
- Event: 800 metres
Medal record
Men's Athletics
Representing Cook Islands
Pacific Games
Gold medal – first place	2019 Apia	800 m
Gold medal – first place	2019 Apia	1,500 m
Bronze medal – third place	2023 Honiara	1,500 m
Pacific Mini Games
Gold medal – first place	2017 Port Vila	800 m
Oceania Athletics Championships
Bronze medal – third place	2017 Suva	800 m

Alex Beddoes (born 9 July 1995) is a runner and athlete from the Cook Islands who has represented the Cook Islands at the Olympic Games, Commonwealth Games, Pacific Games, and Pacific Mini Games.

== Career ==
Beddoes first participated in the Oceania Closed Junior Championships. There, he successfully defeated Guamanian Cory Morrison at tennis. He competed in the 2013 Pacific Mini Games in Mata Utu, and then at the 2017 Pacific Mini Games in Port Vila, where he won gold in the 800 meters.

Beddoes competed in the Men's 800 metres at the 2016 Summer Olympics, but finished ninth in his heat, for last place with a time of 1:52.76, and was eliminated. However, he did set a personal best. He was flag bearer for the Cook Islands during the closing ceremony.

Beddoes competed at the 2018 Commonwealth Games in the Men's 800 metres. He finished 7th in his heat with a time of 1:51.64 but was eliminated.

Beddoes participated at the 2019 Pacific Games. He won the men's 800 metres and the following day he also won the men's 1500 metres in 4 minutes and 3.14 seconds. In winning the men's 1500 metres gold medal he beat Papua New Guinean Messach Fred and Fijian Petero Veitaqomaki.

Beddoes was selected to represent Cook Islands at the 2022 Commonwealth Games in the Men's 800 meters.

He competed in the 2023 Pacific Games in Honiara, where he also coached fellow runner Rupeni Mataitoga. He won a bronze in the 1,500 meters.

== Awards ==
- Beddoes won the gold metal in the 2019 Pacific Games.
- On 25 April 2019, Beddoes won the Emerging Talent Award from the Oceania Athletics Association. The award was presented by president Erin Quirke and secretary Ruth Tangiiau Mave.

=== Nominations ===
- Beddoes was nominated for the Sportsman of the Year award at the Cook Islands National Sports Awards at the Edgewater Resort and Spa.

== See also ==
- Beddoes
- List of Cook Islands records in athletics
