= Sam Nunuke Pera =

Cook Islands weightlifter

Personal information
- Full name: Sam Nunuke Pera
- Nationality: Cook Islands
- Born: 4 April 1969 (age 57) Rarotonga, Cook Islands
- Height: 1.65 m (5 ft 5 in)
- Weight: 105 kg (231 lb)

Sport
- Sport: Weightlifting
- Event: 105 kg

Sam Nunuke Pera (born 4 April 1969 in Rarotonga) is a retired Cook Islands weightlifter. He represented the Cook Islands in three editions of the Olympic Games (1992, 1996, and 2004), and has been named the nation's sportsman of the year five times. Pera is also the father of Sam Pera, Jr., who later competed in the same weightlifting division at the 2008 Summer Olympics in Beijing.

Pera made his official debut in the men's first heavyweight class (100 kg) at the 1992 Summer Olympics in Barcelona, where he failed to lift 105 kg for three successive attempts in the single-motion snatch. At the 1996 Summer Olympics in Atlanta, Pera recovered from a setback with a twenty-fourth-place finish in the men's 99 kg class, lifting a total of 285 kg (120 in the snatch and 165 in the clean and jerk). Following his mediocre performances in weightlifting, he was forced to retire immediately from the sport in the same year.

Pera returned from a long absence to compete at the 2002 Commonwealth Games in Manchester, where he finished fifth in the same division with a total haul of 277 kg. At the 2004 Summer Olympics in Athens, Pera qualified for his third Cook Islands squad, as a 35-year-old, in the men's heavyweight class (105 kg) by receiving a continental berth from the Oceanian Weightlifting Championships. He successfully lifted 135 kg in the single-motion snatch, and hoisted 170 kg in the two-part, shoulder-to-overhead clean and jerk to deliver a fourteenth-place finish in a field of twenty-two weightlifters with a total of 305 kg.
