= Cook Islands at the 2011 World Aquatics Championships =

Sporting event delegation

Flag of Cook Islands

Cook Islands competed at the 2011 World Aquatics Championships in Shanghai, China between July 16 and 31, 2011.

== Open water swimming ==
Men

Athlete	Event	Final	
Athlete	Event	Time	Position
Hayden Vickers	Men's 5km	1:11:02.1	50

== Swimming ==
Cook Islands qualified 2 swimmers.

Men

Athlete	Event	Heats		Semifinals		Final	
Athlete	Event	Time	Rank	Time	Rank	Time	Rank
Tepaia Payne	Men's 50m Freestyle	26.50	78	did not advance			
Tepaia Payne	Men's 100m Freestyle	58.59	86	did not advance			

Women

Athlete	Event	Heats		Semifinals		Final	
Athlete	Event	Time	Rank	Time	Rank	Time	Rank
Celeste Brown	Women's 50m Freestyle	29.59	58	did not advance			
Celeste Brown	Women's 100m Freestyle	1:05.76	65	did not advance			
