= Cook Islands Sports and National Olympic Committee =

National Olympic Committee

- Country: Cook Islands
- [[|]]
- Code: COK
- Recognized: 1986
- Continental Association: ONOC
- President: Hugh Richard Graham
- Secretary General: Owen Lewis
- Website: www.cookislandssports.org

The Cook Islands Sports and National Olympic Committee (CISNOC) (IOC code: COK) is the governing body for sports in Cook Islands and its National Olympic Committee.

Originally founded in 1943 as the Rarotonga Sports Association, the organisation became the Cook Islands Sports Association in 1960. In 1986 it was recognised by the International Olympic Committee and changed its name to the Cook Islands Sports & Olympic Association (CISOA). In 2002 it changed its name to the Cook Islands Sports & National Olympic Committee. In 1992 when Lotto was introduced to the Cook Islands, it was used to fund CISOA, with 35% of sales going to the organisation.

Past presidents of the organisation include:

- Kura Strickland (—1979)
- Hugh Henry (1979—1993)
- Terry Hagen (1993—1997)
- John Tierney (1997—2000)
- Tekaotiki Matapo (2000—2009)
- Geoffrey Henry (2009—2012)
- Hugh R. Graham (2012—)

== See also ==
- Cook Islands at the Olympics
- Cook Islands at the Commonwealth Games
