= Flag of the Cook Islands =

Cook Islands
- Use: Civil and state flag
- Proportion: 1:2
- Adopted: August 4, 1979; 47 years ago
- Design: A Blue Ensign with a ring of fifteen white stars in the fly.
- Flag of the King's Representative of Cook Islands
- Use: Flag of the King's Representative
- Proportion: 1:2
- Adopted: 4 August 1979
- Design: A Blue Ensign with a crown surrounded by a ring of fifteen white stars in the fly.

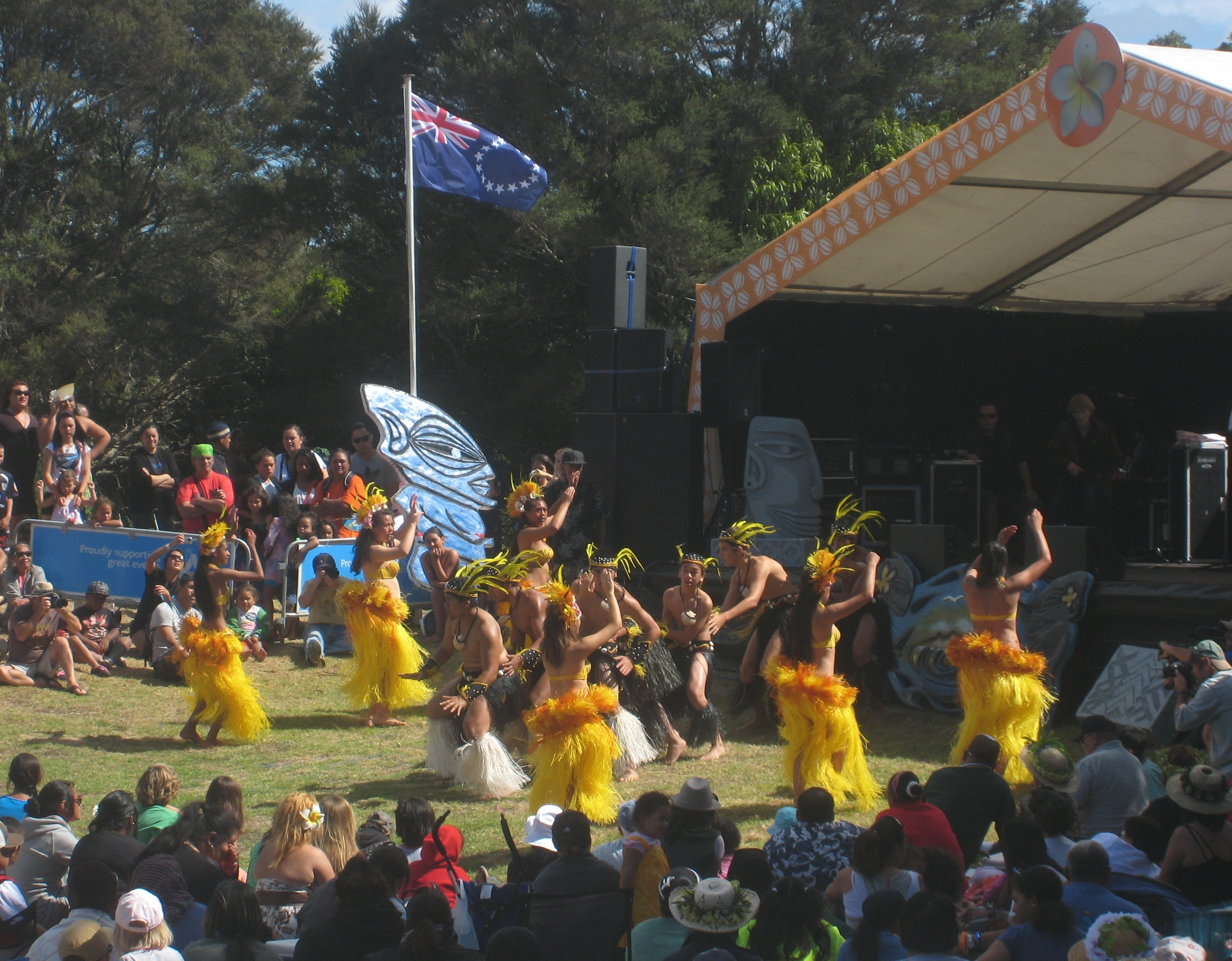
Cook Islands flag flying at the 2010 Pasifika Festival.

The national flag of the Cook Islands, officially known as the Cook Islands Ensign, is based on the traditional design for former British colonies in the Pacific region. It is a Blue Ensign containing the Union Jack in the upper left, and on the right, fifteen stars in a ring. The Union Jack is symbolic of the nation's historic ties to the United Kingdom and to the Commonwealth of Nations. The stars stand for the fifteen islands that make up the Cook Islands (Tongareva, Rakahanga, Manihiki, Pukapuka, Nassau, Suwarrow, Palmerston, Aitutaki, Manuae, Takutea, Atiu, Mitiaro, Mauke, Rarotonga and Mangaia). The blue represents the ocean and the peaceful nature of the inhabitants.

== History ==
A Federal Flag Bill was proposed in the Cook Islands Parliament in 1892, but was not assented to. The proposed flag had consisted of three horizontal stripes (red, white, red), with a Union Flag in the top left corner, overlaid by a black coconut palm tree on a white circle. When the islands were annexed by New Zealand in 1901, the New Zealand flag was used instead.

In 1973 a contest was held to design a new flag, with 120 entries. The winner was chosen at a meeting of the cabinet, judging panel and the flag design committee, a green ensign with 15 gold stars in a circle. The gold was to represent the "friendliness of Cook Islanders and their hope, faith, dedication, love and happiness"; the circle represented "unity and strength of purpose and the moulding of 15 islands into one united people"; the stars were "symbols of heaven, faith in god and the power that has guided Cook Islanders throughout their history"; and the green background was to represent the "nation, the vitality of the land and the people of the evergreen and lasting growth of the Cook Islands". The new flag was raised for the first time on 24 January 1974.

In 1979 it was replaced by the current flag.

In December 2023, Prime Minister Mark Brown suggested that the national flag should be changed back to the 1973–1979 version, claiming that it would be better reflective of the Cook Islands' national colours and sovereignty. In January 2024, Brown further suggested that the decision on the flag could be put to a referendum.

== Historical flags ==
=== National flags ===
Flag of the Kingdom of Rarotonga between 1858 and 1888

Flag of the Kingdom of Rarotonga between 1888 and 1893

Flag of the Cook Islands Federation from 1893 to June 11, 1901

Flag of the Cook Islands between June 11, 1901 and March 24, 1902

Flag of the Cook Islands from March 24, 1902 to July 23, 1973

Flag of the Cook Islands from July 23, 1973 to August 4, 1979

Flag of the Cook Islands from 1979–present

=== Proposed flags ===
Proposed flag of the Cook Islands from 1973, designed by Len Staples

== See also ==
- List of New Zealand flags
