= List of flag bearers for Solomon Islands at the Olympics =

Solomon Islands at the Olympics
- Flag of Solomon Islands
- IOC code: SOL
- NOC: National Olympic Committee of Solomon Islands
- Website: www.oceaniasport.com/solomon
- Medals: Gold 0 Silver 0 Bronze 0 Total 0

Summer appearances
- 1984; 1988; 1992; 1996; 2000; 2004; 2008; 2012; 2016; 2020; 2024

This is a list of flag bearers who have represented Solomon Islands at the Olympics.

Flag bearers carry the national flag of their country at the opening ceremony of the Olympic Games.

#	Event year	Season	Flag bearer	Sport	Ref.
1	1984	Summer	Tommy Bauro	Boxing	
2	1988	Summer	Gustave Mansad	Official	
3	1992	Summer	Leslie Ata	Weightlifting	
4	1996	Summer	Joseph Onika	Athletics (Note: Did not compete)	
5	2000	Summer	Primo Higa	Athletics	
6	2004	Summer	Francis Manioru	Athletics	
7	2008	Summer	Wendy Hale	Weightlifting	
8	2012	Summer	Jenly Tegu Wini	Weightlifting	
9	2016	Summer	Jenly Tegu Wini	Weightlifting	
10	2020	Summer	Sharon Firisua	Athletics	
10	2020	Summer	Edgar Iro	Swimming	
11	2024	Summer	Sharon Firisua	Athletics	
11	2024	Summer	Isabelle Miller	Swimming	

== See also ==
- Solomon Islands at the Olympics
