= Solomon Islands at the World Athletics Championships =

- WA code: SOL
- National federation: Athletic Solomons
- Website: athletics-oceania.com/solomon-islands/
- Medals: Gold 0 Silver 0 Bronze 0 Total 0

World Athletics Championships appearances (overview)
- 1983; 1987–1993; 1995; 1997; 1999; 2001; 2003; 2005; 2007; 2009; 2011; 2013; 2015; 2017; 2019; 2022; 2023; 2025

The Solomon Islands has competed at the World Athletics Championships on thirteen occasions, competing in 1983 then every edition since 1995. Its competing country code is SOL. The country has not won any medals at the competition and as of 2022 no Solomon Islander athlete has progressed beyond the first round of an event.

== 2019 ==
The Solomon Islands will compete at the 2019 World Championships in Athletics in Doha, Qatar, from 27 September 2019.

Athlete	Event	Preliminary Round		Heat		Semifinal		Final	
Athlete	Event	Result	Rank	Result	Rank	Result	Rank	Result	Rank
Paul Ma'unikeni	100 metres	11.29	18	Did not advance					
