= Solomon Islands at the 1996 Summer Olympics =

- Flag of the Solomon Islands
- IOC code: SOL
- NOC: National Olympic Committee of Solomon Islands
- Website: www.oceaniasport.com/solomon

in Atlanta
- Competitors: 4
- Flag bearer: Joseph Onika
- Medals: Gold 0 Silver 0 Bronze 0 Total 0

Summer Olympics appearances (overview)
- 1984; 1988; 1992; 1996; 2000; 2004; 2008; 2012; 2016; 2020; 2024; 2028

The Solomon Islands sent a delegation to compete at the 1996 Summer Olympics in Atlanta, United States from 19 July to 4 August 1996. This was the nation's fourth appearance at a Summer Olympic Games. The delegation to Atlanta consisted of four athletes, three in track and field: Selwyn Kole, Primo Higa, and Nester Geniwala'a; and one in weightlifting: Tony Analau. None of the athletes made their event final.

== Background ==
The National Olympic Committee of Solomon Islands was recognized by the International Olympic Committee on 31 December 1982. Having participated in the 1984, 1988, and 1992 Summer Olympics, the Atlanta Olympics were their fourth appearance in Olympic competition. The 1996 Summer Olympics were held from 19 July to 4 August 1996; 10,318 athletes represented 194 National Olympic Committees. The Solomon Islands' delegation to Atlanta consisted of four athletes, three in track and field: Selwyn Kole, Primo Higa, and Nester Geniwala'a; and one in weightlifting: Tony Analau.

== Athletics ==
Selwyn Kole was 22 years old at the time of the Atlanta Olympics, and was making his Olympic debut. In the first round of the men's 1500 meters, held on 29 July, he was drawn into heat five. He finished in a time of 4 minutes and 3.44 seconds, 12th and last in his heat, and insufficient to advance to the next round. Primo Higa was 23 years old at the time. On 29 July, in the first round of the men's 3000 meters steeplechase he failed to finish the race and was eliminated from the competition. Higa would return four years later to represent the Solomon Islands at the 2000 Summer Olympics. Nester Geniwala'a was 19 years of age at the time, and making her Olympic debut. In the first round of the women's 100 meters on 26 July, she was drawn into heat six. She finished the heat in 13.74 seconds, eighth in her heat. Only the top four from each heat plus to next four overall fastest could advance, and she was eliminated.

Key

- Note–Ranks given for track events are within the athlete's heat only
- N/A = Round not applicable for the event

Athlete	Event	Heat		Quarterfinal		Semifinal		Final	
Athlete	Event	Result	Rank	Result	Rank	Result	Rank	Result	Rank
Selwyn Kole	Men's 1500 m	4:03.44	12	N/A		Did not advance			
Primo Higa	Men's 3000 m steeplechase	Did not finish		N/A				Did not advance	
Nester Geniwala'a	Women's 100 m	13.74	8	Did not advance					

== Weightlifting ==
Tony Analau was 27 years old at the time of the Atlanta Olympics, and was making his Olympic debut. He competed in the men's under 64 kilograms category on 22 July. In the snatch he failed all three attempts to lift 80 kilograms, and was eliminated from the competition.

Key

- Note– Struck through values indicate a competitor failed to achieve a valid lift at that weight.

Athlete	Event	Snatch		Clean & Jerk		Total	Rank
Athlete	Event	Result	Rank	Result	Rank	Total	Rank
Tony Analau	Men's − 64 kg	~~80~~		Did not finish			
