= Solomon Islands at the 1984 Summer Olympics =

- Flag of Solomon Islands
- IOC code: SOL
- NOC: National Olympic Committee of Solomon Islands

in Los Angeles
- Competitors: 3 in 2 sports
- Flag bearer: Tommy Bauro
- Medals: Gold 0 Silver 0 Bronze 0 Total 0

Summer Olympics appearances (overview)
- 1984; 1988; 1992; 1996; 2000; 2004; 2008; 2012; 2016; 2020; 2024

Solomon Islands sent a delegation to compete in the Olympic Games for the first time at the 1984 Summer Olympics in Los Angeles, United States from 28 July to 12 August 1984. The delegation consisted of three athletes: track and field competitors Charlie Oliver and Johnson Kere, and weightlifter Leslie Ata. Kere took part in the men's 100 metres and Oliver was an entrant in the men's 800 metres. Neither of the track and field athletes advanced beyond their heats, and Ata placed 16th in the men's lightweight event.

== Background ==
The National Olympic Committee of Solomon Islands was recognized by the International Olympic Committee on 31 December 1982. These 1984 Olympics were, accordingly, their first participation in Olympic competition. The 1984 Summer Olympics were held in Los Angeles from 28 July to 12 August 1984; a total of 6,829 athletes representing 140 countries took part. The Solomon Islands delegation to Los Angeles consisted of three athletes, track and field competitors Charlie Oliver and Johnson Kere, as well as weightlifter Leslie Ata.

== Athletics ==
Johnson Kere made his only Olympic appearance at these Games, and competed in the men's 100 metres race. On 3 August, he ran in the first round of the 100 metres, and was assigned to heat nine. He finished the heat in 11.57 seconds, seventh and last in his heat. Only the top three from a heat and the next seven fastest overall would progress, and Kere was eliminated, the slowest qualifying time was 10.72 seconds. The gold medal was by Carl Lewis of the United States in 9.99 seconds; silver was taken by Sam Graddy also of the US, and bronze by Ben Johnson of Canada.

Charlie Oliver was 29 years old at the time of the Los Angeles Olympics, and also making his only Olympic appearance. On 3 August, in the first round of the men's 800 metres, he was drawn into heat eight. He finished the race in 1 minute and 53.22 seconds, to place sixth out of eight people in his heat, but only the top three from a heat and the next five overall fastest could advance. Oliver was accordingly eliminated; the slowest qualifying time was 1 minute and 48.09 seconds. Joaquim Cruz of Brazil won gold in 1 minute and 43 seconds, while Sebastian Coe of Great Britain took silver and Earl Jones of the United States won bronze.

Athlete	Event	Heat		Quarterfinal		Semifinal		Final	
Athlete	Event	Result	Rank	Result	Rank	Result	Rank	Result	Rank
Johnson Kere	Men's 100 m	11.57	7	did not advance					
Charlie Oliver	Men's 800 m	1:53.22	6	—N/a		did not advance			

== Weightlifting ==
Leslie Ata was 20 years old at the time of the Los Angeles Olympics. On 1 August he took part in the men's lightweight competition. In Olympic weightlifting, each competitor is given three attempts at each discipline, the highest successfully lifted weight counts as the athlete's mark for that portion of the competition. In his three attempts at the snatch, he would lift 75 kilograms, and then 80 kilograms, before failing to lift 85.2 kilograms, making his mark in the snatch 80 kilograms. In the clean and jerk, he lifted 100, 105, and 107.5 kilograms in order, which made his mark for the clean and jerk 107.5 kilograms. His total mark was 187.5 kilograms, which put him 18th and last; the gold medal was won by Yao Jingyuan of China with a mark of 320 kilograms, silver by Andrei Socaci of Romania with a mark of 312.5 kilograms, and bronze by Jouni Grönman of Finland with the same mark. With the same mark, Socaci won silver because his body weight was less. Ata would go on to represent Solomon Islands at the 1992 Summer Olympics.

Athlete	Event	Snatch		Clean & Jerk		Total	Rank
Athlete	Event	Result	Rank	Result	Rank	Total	Rank
Leslie Ata	Men's lightweight	80	16	107.5	18	187.5	16
