= Solomon Islands at the 2025 World Aquatics Championships =

- Flag of Solomon Islands
- World Aquatics code: SOL
- National federation: Solomon Islands Swimming Federation

in Singapore
- Competitors: 2 in 1 sport
- Medals: Gold 0 Silver 0 Bronze 0 Total 0

World Aquatics Championships appearances
- 2019; 2022; 2023; 2024; 2025

Solomon Islands competed at the 2025 World Aquatics Championships in Singapore from July 11 to August 3, 2025.

== Competitors ==
The following is the list of competitors in the Championships.

| Sport | Men | Women | Total |
|---|---|---|---|
| Swimming | 2 | 0 | 2 |
| Total | 2 | 0 | 2 |

== Swimming ==
Solomon Islands entered 2 swimmers.

Men

| Athlete | Event | Heat | | Semi-final | | Final | |
| Athlete | Event | Time | Rank | Time | Rank | Time | Rank |
|---|---|---|---|---|---|---|---|
| Brenton Naka | 50 m freestyle | 28.35 | 111 | Did not advance | | | |
| Brenton Naka | 50 m butterfly | 1:07.59 | 106 | Did not advance | | | |
| Beula Sanga | 50 m backstroke | 36.11 | 60 | Did not advance | | | |
| Beula Sanga | 50 m breaststroke | Disqualified | | Did not advance | | | |
