= Solomon Islands at the 1988 Summer Olympics =

- Solomon Islands flag
- IOC code: SOL
- NOC: National Olympic Committee of Solomon Islands

in Seoul
- Competitors: 4 in 4 sports
- Flag bearer: Gustave Mansad
- Medals: Gold 0 Silver 0 Bronze 0 Total 0

Summer Olympics appearances (overview)
- 1984; 1988; 1992; 1996; 2000; 2004; 2008; 2012; 2016; 2020; 2024; 2028

Solomon Islands sent a delegation to compete at the 1988 Summer Olympics in Seoul, South Korea from 17 September to 2 October 1988. This was the island nation's second time participating in a Summer Olympic Games, following their debut four years earlier. Solomon Islands competed at these games in track and field, archery, boxing, and weightlifting, with one competitor in each category. Only Benjamin Fafale, the weightlifter, completed an event final, finishing 22nd in the middleweight category.

== Background ==
The National Olympic Committee of Solomon Islands was recognised by the International Olympic Committee on 31 December 1982. Having joined Olympic competition at the 1984 Summer Olympics, these Seoul Games were their second appearance at an Olympics. Solomon Islands competed at these games in track and field, archery, boxing, and weightlifting, with one competitor in each category. A second boxer was entered, but did not compete.

== Competitors ==
The following is the list of number of competitors in the Games.

Sport	Men	Women	Total
Archery	1	0	1
Athletics	1	0	1
Boxing	1	–	1
Weightlifting	1	–	1
Total	4	0	4

== Archery ==
In the nation's Olympic archery debut, Solomon Islands was represented by one archer. Derrick Tenai was 20 years old at the time of these Olympics, and was making his Olympic debut. In the ranking round of the men's individual event, only the top 24 archers would advance to the second round. Tenai scored 505 points, which put him in 84th and last place, meaning he was eliminated.

Athlete	Event	Ranking round		Eighth-final		Quarterfinal		Semifinal		Final	
Athlete	Event	Score	Rank	Score	Rank	Score	Rank	Score	Rank	Score	Rank
Derrick Tenai	Men's individual	505	84	Did not advance							

== Athletics ==
John Maeke was 26 years old at the time of these Olympics, and was making his only Olympic appearance. On 23 September, he took part in the first round of the Men's 10,000 metres, being drawn into heat two. He finished the race in a time of 35 minutes and 16.93 seconds, which was 22nd in the heat. As only the top eight in each heat, plus the next four fastest overall could advance to the finals, Maeke was eliminated. On 2 October, he failed to finish the men's marathon

=== Track events ===
Athlete	Events	Heat		Semifinal		Final	
Athlete	Events	Time	Position	Time	Position	Time	Position
John Maeke	Men's 10,000 m	35:16.93	43			Did not advance	

=== Road events ===
Athlete	Events	Final	
Athlete	Events	Time	Position
John Maeke	Men's marathon	did not finish	

== Boxing ==
Tommy Bauro was 23 years old at the time of the Seoul Olympics, and was making his only Olympic appearance. On 21 September, he lost in the first round of the light heavyweight competition to Sione Vaveni Talia'uli of Tonga, due to a knockout in the first round. Basil Maelagi was listed in the official report of the Games, but did not compete, giving his opponent, Reiner Gies, a walkover in the first round of the light welterweight class on 19 September.

Athlete	Event	Round of 32	Round of 16	Quarterfinals	Semifinals	Final
Athlete	Event	Opposition Result	Opposition Result	Opposition Result	Opposition Result	Opposition Result
Tommy Bauro	Light Heavyweight	Sione Vaveni Talia'uli (TGA); L KOH	Did not advance			
Basil Maelagi	Light Welterweight	Reiner Gies (FRG); L WO	Did not advance			

== Weightlifting ==
Benjamin Fafale was 20 years old at the time of the Seoul Olympics, and was making his only Olympic appearance. He participated in the men's middleweight event on 22 September. In his three attempts at the snatch, he first lifted 80 kilograms, then failed at 85 kilograms, before using his third attempt to succeed at the same weight, making his final mark for that portion 85 kilograms, putting him in 24th place. In the clean and jerk, he lifted 100 and 105 kilograms in his first and second attempts, respectively. In his third attempt, he failed at lifting 107.5 kilograms, making his final mark for this portion of the event 105 kilograms, putting him in 22nd place. Fafale's final score for the event was 190 kilograms, which put him in 22nd place overall; the gold medal was won by Borislav Gidikov of Bulgaria with a mark of 375 kilograms.

Athlete	Event	Snatch		Clean & jerk		Total	Rank
Athlete	Event	Result	Rank	Result	Rank	Total	Rank
Benjamin Fafale	Men's middleweight	85 kg	24	105 kg	22	190 kg	22
