= Solomon Islands at the 2000 Summer Olympics =

- Flag of the Solomon Islands
- IOC code: SOL
- NOC: National Olympic Committee of Solomon Islands
- Website: www.oceaniasport.com/solomon

in Sydney
- Competitors: 2 in 1 sport
- Flag bearer: Primo Higa (opening)
- Medals: Gold 0 Silver 0 Bronze 0 Total 0

Summer Olympics appearances (overview)
- 1984; 1988; 1992; 1996; 2000; 2004; 2008; 2012; 2016; 2020; 2024

The Solomon Islands sent a delegation to compete at the 2000 Summer Olympics in Sydney, Australia from 15 September to 1 October 2000. This was the nation's fifth appearance at a Summer Olympic Games. The Solomon Islands' delegation to Sydney consisted of two track and field athletes, Primo Higa and Jenny Keni. Higa competed in the men's steeplechase, and Keni in the women's 100 meters. but neither advanced beyond the first round of their event.

== Background ==
The National Olympic Committee of Solomon Islands was recognized by the International Olympic Committee on 31 December 1982. These Sydney Games were their fifth straight appearance in the Summer Olympic Games since their debut in the 1984 Summer Olympics. The Solomon Islands have never won a medal in Olympic competition. The 2000 Summer Olympics were held from 15 September to 1 October 2000; a total of 10,651 athletes represented 199 National Olympic Committees. The Solomon Islands' delegation to Sydney consisted of two track and field athletes, Primo Higa and Jenny Keni. Higa was chosen as the flag bearer for the opening ceremony.

== Athletics ==
Jenny Keni was 17 years old at the time of the Sydney Olympics, and was making her Olympic debut. In the heats of the Women's 100 meters, held on 23 September, she was drawn into heat two. She finished her heat with a time of 13.01 seconds, eighth and last in her heat; only the top three from each heat plus the next two fastest overall from all ten hears were allowed to advance, meaning she was eliminated, the slowest qualifying time being 11.60 seconds. In the event overall, the gold medal is vacant due to original gold medalist Marion Jones of the United States admitting to steroid use and forfeiting her medals and results from the Sydney Games. Officially, the medals in the event are held by Ekaterini Thanou of Greece and Tayna Lawrence (the original bronze medalist) of Jamaica sharing silver, and Merlene Ottey, also of Jamaica, the original fourth-place finisher, being awarded a bronze. Gold was left vacant because Thanou, the original silver medalist, had her own issue with missing a drug test at the 2004 Summer Olympics Keni would later represent the Solomon Islands at the 2004 Summer Olympics.

Primo Higa was 27 years old at the time of these Olympics, and was returning to the Games following his representation of the Solomon Islands at the 1996 Summer Olympics, where he did not finish the 3000 meters steeplechase. On 27 September, he took part in the first round of the men's 3000 meters steeplechase, and was drawn into heat one. He finished the race in 9 minutes and 44.12 seconds, and was 13th and last in his heat; only the best four in each heat and the next three fastest overall from all three heats were able to advance, the slowest qualifying time was 8 minutes and 25.70 seconds. The gold medal was won by Reuben Kosgei of Kenya in a time of 8 minutes and 21.43 seconds; the silver was taken by Wilson Boit Kipketer, also of Kenya, and the bronze medal was won by Ali Ezzine of Morocco.

Athlete	Event	Heat		Quarterfinal		Semifinal		Final	
Athlete	Event	Result	Rank	Result	Rank	Result	Rank	Result	Rank
Jenny Keni	Women's 100 m	13.01	8	Did not advance					
Primo Higa	Men's 3000 m steeplechase	9:44.12	13	N/A				Did not advance	

- Note–Ranks given for track events are within the athlete's heat only
