= Solomon Islands at the 2024 Summer Olympics =

- IOC code: SOL
- NOC: National Olympic Committee of Solomon Islands
- Website: www.oceaniasport.com/solomon

in Paris, France 26 July 2024 – 11 August 2024
- Competitors: 2 (0 men and 2 women) in 2 sports
- Flag bearer (opening): Isabella Millar
- Flag bearer (closing): Sharon Firisua
- Medals: Gold 0 Silver 0 Bronze 0 Total 0

Summer Olympics appearances (overview)
- 1984; 1988; 1992; 1996; 2000; 2004; 2008; 2012; 2016; 2020; 2024

Solomon Islands competed at the 2024 Summer Olympics in Paris, France, which were held from 26 July to 11 August 2024. The country's participation in Paris marked its eleventh appearance at the Summer Olympics since its debut in 1984. The athlete delegation of the country was composed of two people: Sharon Firisua in athletics and Isabella Millar in swimming. The Solomon Islands Athletics Federation also tried to qualify more athletics competitors for the games but they had already missed the deadline for submission. The delegation was supported by a collaboration between the Australian Government and the Australian Olympic Committee, which was made for the development of sport in Pacific nations.

Firisua and Millar qualified for the games after receiving universality slots in their events, which allows underrepresented nations to compete and for a National Olympic Committee (NOC) to send athletes despite not meeting the other qualification criteria. Firisua competed in the women's 100 metres but ran in a time not fast enough to progress into further rounds, though she set a personal best in the event. Millar then competed in the women's 50 metre freestyle and also did not progress further after not finishing with a fast enough time. Thus, Solomon Islands has yet to win an Olympic medal.

== Background ==
The games were held from July 26 to August 11, 2024, in the city of Paris, France. This edition marked the nation's eleventh appearance at the Summer Olympics since its debut at the 1984 Summer Olympics in Los Angeles, United States. The nation had never won a medal at the Olympics, with its best performance coming from judoka Tony Lomo placing joint ninth in the men's 60 kg event at the 2012 Summer Olympics in London, United Kingdom.

In the lead-up to the 2024 games, the Australian Government announced a collaboration with the Australian Olympic Committee to assist over 230 athletes from 13 Pacific nations (Note: Among the nations that were supported for the games included the Cook Islands, the Federated States of Micronesia, Kiribati, the Marshall Islands, Palau, Papua New Guinea, Samoa, Tonga, Tuvalu, and Vanuatu.) for the 2024 Summer Olympics and 2024 Summer Paralympics, which included Solomon Islands. The collaboration was made to create opportunities for the said nations to compete in international competition, gain access to coaching, and to develop sports diplomacy. The International Olympic Committee also awarded seven athletes from Solomon Islands a scholarship in the lead-up on 3 November 2022. The athletes that were awarded the scholarships were Sharon Firisua and Rosefelo Siosi in athletics, Pemberton Lele in boxing, Issac Pat Myrie in taekwondo, and Mary Kini Lifu and Jenly Tegu Wini in weightlifting.

=== Delegation ===
The athlete delegation of the nation for the games was composed of two athletes: Sharon Firisua in athletics and Isabella Millar in swimming. The nation was the only athlete delegation to only have female competitors at these games, with all of the other delegations including at least one male competitor. Nationally top-ranked boxer Pemberton Lele was set to join the delegation as he qualified for the men's 63.5 kg event through a universality slot, which allows underrepresented nations to compete and for National Olympic Committee (NOC) to send athletes despite not meeting the standard qualification criteria. In the lead-up to the games, he participated in the Oceanian Olympic Qualifying Tournament in Honiara, Solomon Islands, but he placed third and failed to qualify through this quota. He aimed to earn the nation's first Olympic gold medal at these games, though withdrew due to logistical errors, with the slot being transferred to John Ume of Papua New Guinea.

The delegation was composed of the chef de mission, NOCSI representatives, the athletes, and their coaches. They traveled from Honiara, the capital of the Solomon Islands, on 15 July, then made stops in Brisbane, Dubai, and Geneva, before landing in Paris. The final delegation went to a training camp in Divonne-les-Bains with other Pacific athletes for their preparations for the Games.

=== Opening and closing ceremonies ===
The Solomon Islander delegation came in 160th out of the 205 National Olympic Committees in the 2024 Summer Olympics Parade of Nations within the opening ceremony. Millar solely held the flag for the delegation in the parade. At the closing ceremony, Firisua held the flag.

== Competitors ==
List of Solomon Islander competitors at the 2024 Summer Olympics
Sport	Men	Women	Total
Athletics	0	1	1
Swimming	0	1	1
Total	0	2	2

== Athletics ==
=== Qualification and lead-up to the games ===
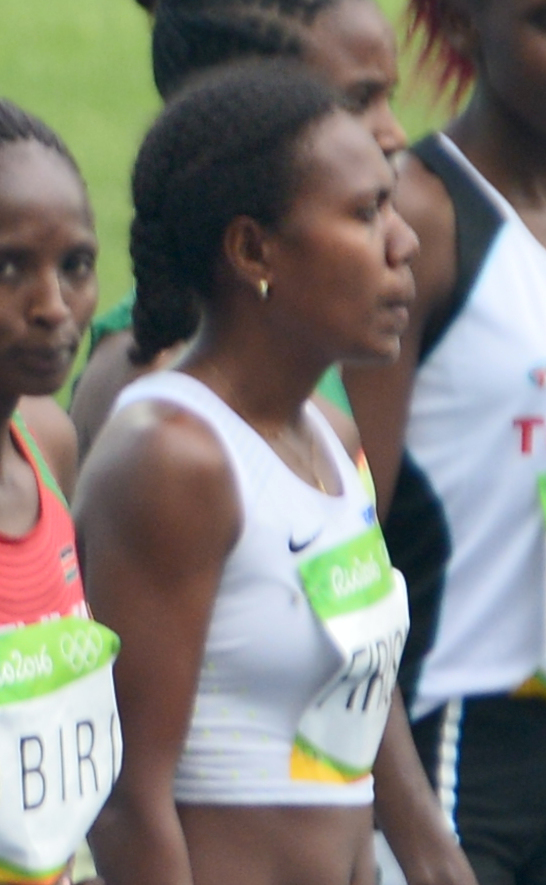
Sharon Firisua (middle) competing in the women's 5000 metres event at the 2016 Summer Olympics.

Solomon Islands was eligible for universality slots to send athletics competitors to the games. The Solomon Islands Athletics Federation (SIAF) initially nominated long-distance runner Firisua, who previously competed at the 2016 Summer Olympics in the 5000 metres and 2020 Summer Olympics in the marathon for the nation, and middle-distance runner Steven Rahausi, to World Athletics' qualification database for the games without any specified events for either of the two. After the 2024 Oceania Athletics Championships in Suva, Fiji, the SIAF tried to submit entries into the database for sprinter Jovita Aruina Ambrose and Luke Haga but was too late as the entry dates for the games already passed.

As the SIAF missed the deadline, they then contacted the National Olympic Committee of Solomon Islands (NOCSI), which then contacted the Oceania Athletics Association, who in turn told the NOCSI to contact the Paris Organising Committee for the 2024 Olympic and Paralympic Games. The NOCSI then asked World Athletics for further confirmation, with the federation confirming that the only eligible athletics competitor for the nation to qualify at the games would be Firisua as they had already missed the deadline for the submission of other competitors. The SIAF then selected Firisua to compete in the women's 100 metres for the games, despite never competing in a distance lower than the 1500 metres, as she was the only active competitor in the database and the women's 100 metres was the only event available with a spot for the nation. NOCSI president Martin Rara additionally commented that the organization had to select Firisua to retain the possibility of universality slots for the nation for succeeding games.

Ambrose, the top-ranked sprinter of the nation who had a faster 100 metres time than Firisua, expressed disappointment for not being selected. She was initially hoping to qualify for the games and represent the nation but threatened to quit the sport after not being chosen, stating, "I will not compete anymore because of what they did." The Australian Broadcasting Corporation later opined that insiders within the NOCSI considered the selection of Firisua as a "farewell gift" given by the committee as Firisua planned to retire from professional sport. Firisua trained in Melbourne, Australia, for her preparations for the games.

=== Event ===
The athletics events were held at the Stade de France. Firisua competed in the preliminary rounds of the women's 100 meters on 2 August 2024 at 10:59 a.m., where she raced in the fourth round. She ran a time of 14.31 seconds for a personal best as she had never raced in the 100 metres before. She placed last out of the nine people in her heat and did not advance further, with her time being the slowest ran by any athlete in any of the preliminary rounds. The eventual winner of the event was Julien Alfred of Saint Lucia, who won with a time of 10.72 and earned Saint Lucia's first Olympic medal.

Track events

Athletics summary
Athlete	Event	Preliminary		Heat		Semifinal		Final	
Athlete	Event	Result	Rank	Result	Rank	Result	Rank	Result	Rank
Sharon Firisua	Women's 100 m	14.31 PB	9	Did not advance					

== Swimming ==
=== Qualification and lead-up to the games ===
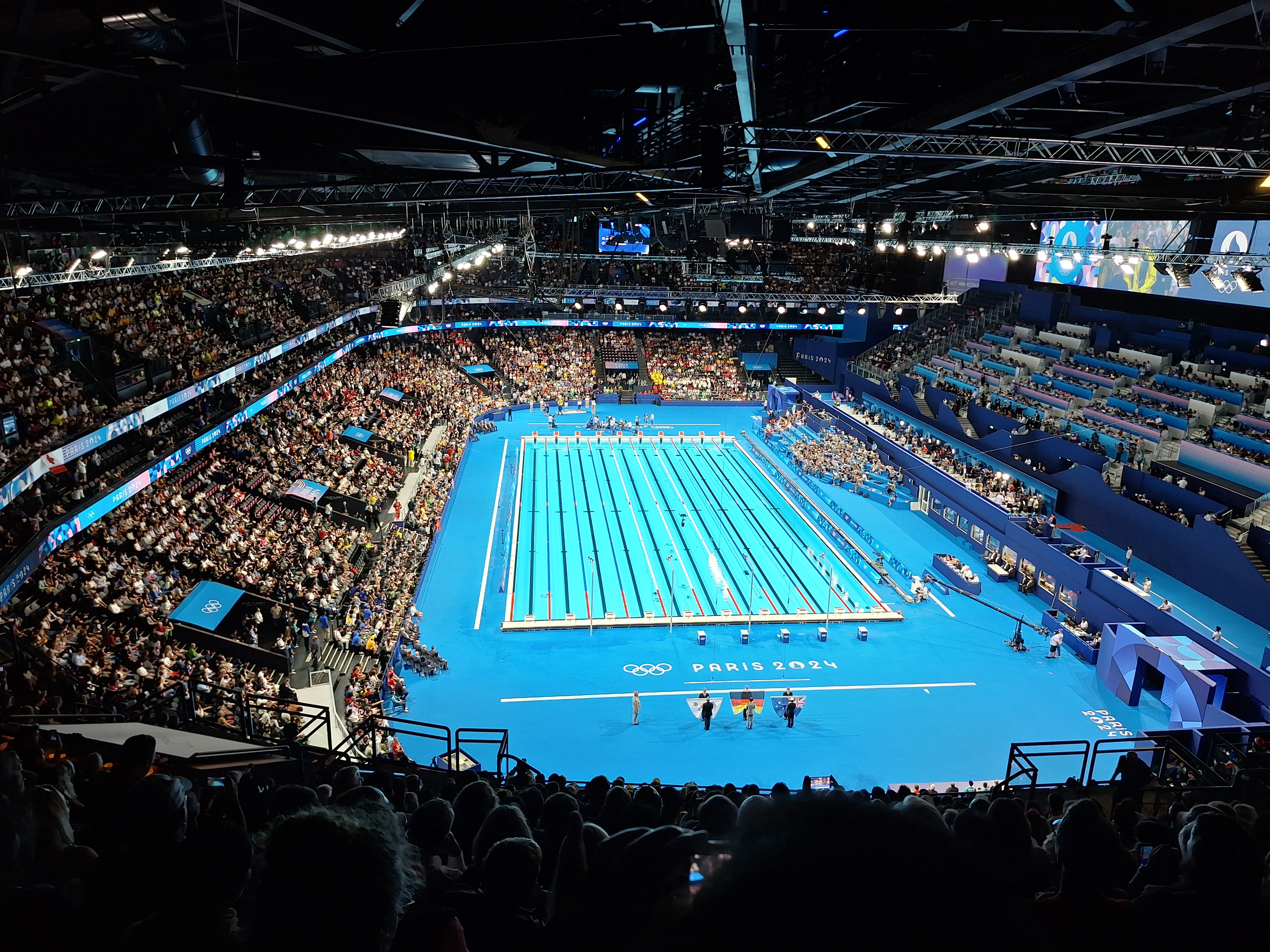
The Paris La Défense Arena, where Millar competed in her event.

Solomon Islands was eligible for a universality slot to send a swimmer to the games. The nation selected Isabella Millar, who would compete in the women's 50 metre freestyle and be the first female swimmer to compete for Solomon Islands at an Olympic Games.

Based in New South Wales, Australia, Millar trained in a pool near her school. She was coached by Stance Sanga. Millar revealed that her main goal for the games was to beat her personal best of 30.04 seconds set at the 2023 Pacific Games.

=== Event ===
Making her Olympic debut, Millar competed in her event on 3 August at 11:05 a.m., which was held in the Paris La Défense Arena. She competed in the third of the heats and swam in a time of 31.32 seconds. She placed last out of the eight swimmers in her heat, though she finished with a time not fast enough to progress to later rounds, and placed 67th overall. The eventual winner of the event was Sarah Sjöström of Sweden, who swam with a time of 23.71 seconds. After her event, Millar thanked her family, friends and supporters for encouraging her.

Swimming summary
Athlete	Event	Heat		Semifinal		Final	
Athlete	Event	Time	Rank	Time	Rank	Time	Rank
Isabella Millar	Women's 50 m freestyle	31.32	67 (Note: Qualifiers for the latter rounds (Q) of all events were decided on a time only basis, therefore positions shown are overall results versus competitors in all heats.)	Did not advance			
