= Solomon Islands at the 2012 Summer Olympics =

- Flag of the Solomon Islands
- IOC code: SOL
- NOC: National Olympic Committee of Solomon Islands
- Website: www.oceaniasport.com/solomon

in London
- Competitors: 4 in 3 sports
- Flag bearers: Jenly Tegu Wini (opening); Tony Lomo (closing)
- Medals: Gold 0 Silver 0 Bronze 0 Total 0

Summer Olympics appearances (overview)
- 1984; 1988; 1992; 1996; 2000; 2004; 2008; 2012; 2016; 2020; 2024

The Solomon Islands competed at the 2012 Summer Olympics in London, England, United Kingdom held from 27 July to 12 August 2012. This was the nation's eighth consecutive appearance at the Olympics.

Four athletes from the Solomon Islands were selected to the team in three different sports. Weightlifter Jenly Tegu Wini was the national flag bearer at the opening ceremony.

== Background ==
The National Olympic Committee of Solomon Islands was formed in 1983 and was recognised by the International Olympic Committee (IOC) the following year. The Solomon Islands made their Olympic debut at the 1984 Summer Olympics in Los Angeles, California, United States. The 2012 Summer Olympics in London, England, United Kingdom marked their eighth consecutive appearance at the Olympics.

== Competitors ==
In total, four athletes represented the Solomon Islands at the 2012 Summer Olympics in London, England, United Kingdom across three different sports.

Sport	Men	Women	Total
Athletics	1	1	2
Judo	1	0	1
Weightlifting	0	1	1
Total	2	2	4

== Athletics ==
In total, two Solomon Islander athletes participated in the athletics events – Chris Walasi in the men's 100 m and Pauline Kwalea in the women's 100 m.

Men

Athlete	Event	Heat		Quarterfinal		Semifinal		Final	
Athlete	Event	Result	Rank	Result	Rank	Result	Rank	Result	Rank
Chris Walasi	100 m	11.42	6	did not advance					

Women

Athlete	Event	Heat		Quarterfinal		Semifinal		Final	
Athlete	Event	Result	Rank	Result	Rank	Result	Rank	Result	Rank
Pauline Kwalea	100 m	12.90	5	did not advance					

== Judo ==
In total, one Solomon Islander athlete participated in the judo events – Tony Lomo in the men's −60 kg category.

Lomo was given a continental spot for being one of the highest-ranked Oceania athletes for the wildcard places. He was able to defeat Mozambique's Neuso Sigauque before losing out to world sixth-ranked Sofiane Milous of France in the round of sixteen. Lomo's performance was congratulated by the Oceania National Olympic Committee and seen as being impressive from other coaches both in and out of Oceania.

Athlete	Event	Round of 64	Round of 32	Round of 16	Quarterfinals	Semifinals	Repechage	Final / BM	
Athlete	Event	Opposition Result	Opposition Result	Opposition Result	Opposition Result	Opposition Result	Opposition Result	Opposition Result	Rank
Tony Lomo	Men's −60 kg	Bye	Sigauque (MOZ); W 0100–0010	Milous (FRA); L 0001–0020	did not advance				

== Weightlifting ==
In total, one Solomon Islander athlete participated in the weightlifting events – Jenly Tegu Wini in the men's −60 kg category.

Solomon Islands was given a reallocation spot to participate in a women's event. Wini was chosen as the 2012 Oceania -58 kg silver medalist. She finished seventeenth and last among the competitors.

Athlete	Event	Snatch		Clean & Jerk		Total	Rank
Athlete	Event	Result	Rank	Result	Rank	Total	Rank
Jenly Tegu Wini	Women's −58 kg	65	19	95	17	160	17
