= Solomon Islands at the 1992 Summer Olympics =

- The flag of Solomon Islands
- IOC code: SOL
- NOC: National Olympic Committee of Solomon Islands

in Barcelona
- Competitors: 1
- Medals: Gold 0 Silver 0 Bronze 0 Total 0

Summer Olympics appearances (overview)
- 1984; 1988; 1992; 1996; 2000; 2004; 2008; 2012; 2016; 2020; 2024

Solomon Islands sent a delegation to compete at the 1992 Summer Olympics in Barcelona, Spain from 25 July to 9 August 1992. This was the nation's third appearance at a Summer Olympic Games. The delegation consisted of a single weightlifter, Leslie Ata, who finished 29th in the men's under 75 kilograms event.

== Background ==
The National Olympic Committee of Solomon Islands was recognized by the International Olympic Committee on 31 December 1982. Having participated in both the 1984 and 1988 Summer Olympics, these Barcelona Olympics were their third appearance in Olympic competition. This was Solomon Islands' smallest Olympic delegation yet, they sent four athletes to the 1984 Olympics, and three to the 1988 Games. Solomon Islands have never won a medal at the Olympics. The 1992 Summer Olympics were held from 25 July to 9 August 1992; a total of 9,356 athletes took part, representing 169 National Olympic Committees. The Solomon Islands' delegation to Barcelona consisted of a single weightlifter, Leslie Ata.

== Competitors ==
The following is the list of number of competitors in the Games.

Sport	Men	Women	Total
Weightlifting	1	–	1
Total	1	0	1

== Weightlifting ==
Leslie Ata was 28 years old at the time, and had previously represented Solomon Islands at the 1984 Summer Olympics. He competed in the men's under 75 kilograms event on 30 July. In Olympic weightlifting, each competitor is given three attempts at each discipline, the highest successfully lifted weight counts as the athlete's mark for that portion of the competition. In the snatch Ata missed his first and second lifts on 105 kilograms, before successfully lifting the same weight on his third and final attempt. In his three attempts at the clean and jerk, he first failed to lift 130 kilograms, before successfully lifting that weight on his second try. On his third attempt, he failed to lift 135 kilograms. Ata's total score for the event was 235 kilograms, good for 29th place out of 31 classified finishers. The gold medal was won by Tudor Casapu of the Unified Team with a mark of 357.5 kilograms; silver was won by Pablo Lara of Cuba, and bronze was taken by Kim Myong-nam of North Korea.

Ata remained involved in the country's sports following the 1992 Olympics. In 2008 he was the co-leader of the delegation sent by Solomon Islands to the 2008 Commonwealth Youth Games. For a term from 2014 to 2018, he was the president of the Solomon Islands Weightlifting Federation.

Athlete	Event	Snatch		Clean & Jerk		Total	Rank
Athlete	Event	Result	Rank	Result	Rank	Total	Rank
Leslie Ata	Men's −75 kg	105.0	30	130.0	29	235.0	29

== See also ==
- Solomon Islands at the Olympics
