= Solomon Islands at the 2004 Summer Olympics =

- Flag of the Solomon Islands
- IOC code: SOL
- NOC: National Olympic Committee of Solomon Islands
- Website: www.oceaniasport.com/solomon

in Athens
- Competitors: 2 (1 man and 1 woman) in 1 sport
- Flag bearer: Francis Manioru
- Medals: Gold 0 Silver 0 Bronze 0 Total 0

Summer Olympics appearances (overview)
- 1984; 1988; 1992; 1996; 2000; 2004; 2008; 2012; 2016; 2020; 2024

The Solomon Islands sent a delegation to compete at the 2004 Summer Olympics in Athens, Greece, from 13 to 29 August 2004. This was the nation's sixth appearance at a Summer Olympic Games since their debut in the 1984 Summer Olympics. The Solomon Islands sent two athletes to these games, both in track and field: Francis Manioru and Jenny Keni. Manioru competed in the men's 100 meters and Keni in the women's event of the same distance. Neither advanced out of their event's heats.

== Background ==
The National Olympic Committee of Solomon Islands was recognized by the International Olympic Committee on 31 December 1982. The Athens Games were their sixth straight appearance in the Summer Olympic Games since their debut in the 1984 Summer Olympics. The Solomon Islands have never won a medal in Olympic competition. The 2004 Summer Olympics were held from 13 to 29 August 2004; a total of 10,625 athletes participated, representing 201 National Olympic Committees. The Solomon Islands sent two athletes to Athens, both in track and field: Francis Manioru and Jenny Keni. Manioru was chosen as the flag bearer for the opening ceremony.

== Athletics ==
Francis Manioru was 22 at the time of the Athens Olympics, and was making his Olympic debut. In the first round of the men's 100 meters, he was drawn into heat nine. He finished the race in 11.05 seconds, seventh place out of nine in his heat. However, only the top three from a heat and the ten next fastest overall from all ten heats were allowed to advance, and he was eliminated, the slowest qualifying time being 10.43 seconds. The gold medal was won by Justin Gatlin of the United States in a time of 9.85 seconds, silver was won by Francis Obikwelu of Portugal in 9.86 seconds, and bronze by Maurice Greene, also of the United States, in 9.87 seconds. Four years later, Manioru would represent the Solomon Islands at the 2008 Summer Olympics.

Jenny Keni was 21 years old at the time of these Games, and had previously represented the Solomon Islands at the 2000 Summer Olympics. In the preliminary heats of the women's 100 meters, she was drawn into heat five. She finished the race in 12.76 seconds, eighth and last in her heat, only the top three from a heat and the next eight fastest overall from all eight heats could advance; the slowest qualifying time was 11.45 seconds, and Keni was eliminated. The gold medal was won by Yulia Nestsiarenka of Belarus in a time of 10.93 seconds; the silver was taken by Lauryn Williams of the United States, and bronze was won by Veronica Campbell-Brown of Jamaica.

Athlete	Event	Heat		Quarterfinal		Semifinal		Final	
Athlete	Event	Result	Rank	Result	Rank	Result	Rank	Result	Rank
Francis Manioru	Men's 100 m	11.05	7	did not advance					
Jenny Keni	Women's 100 m	12.76	8	did not advance					

- Note–Ranks given for track events are within the athlete's heat only
