= Solomon Islands at the 2022 World Aquatics Championships =

- Flag of Solomon Islands
- World Aquatics code: SOL

in Budapest, Hungary
- Competitors: 1 in 1 sport
- Medals: Gold 0 Silver 0 Bronze 0 Total 0

World Aquatics Championships appearances
- 2019; 2022; 2023; 2024; 2025

Solomon Islands competed at the 2022 World Aquatics Championships in Budapest, Hungary from 18 June to 3 July.

== Swimming ==
Swimmers from Solomon Islands have achieved qualifying standards in the following events.

Athlete	Event	Heat		Semifinal		Final	
Athlete	Event	Time	Rank	Time	Rank	Time	Rank
Edgar Iro	Men's 50 m freestyle	27.39	82	did not advance			
Edgar Iro	Men's 100 m freestyle	1:00.73	95	did not advance			
