= Solomon Islands at the 2023 World Athletics Championships =

- Flag of Solomon Islands
- WA code: SOL

in Budapest, Hungary 19 August 2023 – 27 August 2023
- Competitors: 1 (0 men and 1 woman)
- Medals: Gold 0 Silver 0 Bronze 0 Total 0

World Athletics Championships appearances (overview)
- 1983; 1987–1993; 1995; 1997; 1999; 2001; 2003; 2005; 2007; 2009; 2011; 2013; 2015; 2017; 2019; 2022; 2023; 2025

Solomon Islands competed at the 2023 World Athletics Championships in Budapest, Hungary, which were held from 19 to 27 August 2023. The athlete delegation of the country was composed of one competitor, sprinter Jovita Arunia who competed in the women's 100 metres. She qualified for the Championships upon being selected by Athletic Solomons. In the preliminary heats, she set a season's best and placed last, failing to advance further.

== Background ==
The 2023 World Athletics Championships in Budapest, Hungary, were held from 19 to 27 August 2023. The Championships were held at the National Athletics Centre. To qualify for the World Championships, athletes had to reach an entry standard (e.g. time or distance), place in a specific position at select competitions, be a wild card entry, or qualify through their World Athletics Ranking at the end of the qualification period.

As Solomon Islands did not meet any of the four standards, they could send either one male or one female athlete in one event of the Championships who has not yet qualified. Athletic Solomons selected sprinter Jovita Arunia, who would compete in the women's 100 metres. At the time of her selection, she had a personal best of 13.15 seconds and was unranked within the World Athletics Rankings. Previously, she represented Solomon Islands at the 2022 Oceania Athletics Championships, where she set her personal best, and the 2022 World Athletics Championships.

== Results ==
Key

- Q = Qualified for the next round
- q = Qualified for the next round as a fastest loser or, in field events, by position without achieving the qualifying target
- NR = National record
- PB = Personal best
- SB = Season best
- N/A = Round not applicable for the event

=== Women ===
Arunia competed in the six preliminary heat of the women's 100 metres on 20 August against seven other sprinters. There, she recorded a time of 13.20 seconds for a season's best and placed last, failing to advance further to the semifinals as only the top three in each heat and the three next fastest would be able to do so.

Track and road events

Athlete	Event	Heat		Semifinal		Final	
Athlete	Event	Result	Rank	Result	Rank	Result	Rank
Jovita Arunia	100 metres	13.20 SB	8	Did not advance			
