= Solomon Islands at the 2020 Summer Olympics =

- IOC code: SOL
- NOC: National Olympic Committee of Solomon Islands
- Website: www.oceaniasport.com/solomon

in Tokyo 23 July 2021 – 8 August 2021
- Competitors: 3 (1 man and 2 women) in 3 sports
- Flag bearers (opening): Sharon Firisua; Edgar Iro
- Flag bearer (closing): Mary Kini Lifu
- Officials: 4 (3 men and 1 woman)
- Medals: Gold 0 Silver 0 Bronze 0 Total 0

Summer Olympics appearances (overview)
- 1984; 1988; 1992; 1996; 2000; 2004; 2008; 2012; 2016; 2020; 2024

Solomon Islands competed at the 2020 Summer Olympics in Tokyo. Originally scheduled to take place from 24 July to 9 August 2020, the Games were postponed to 23 July to 8 August 2021, due to the COVID-19 pandemic. The country's participation in Tokyo marked its tenth appearance at the Summer Olympics since its debut in 1984.

The Solomon Islands delegation consisted of three athletes: long-distance runner Sharon Firisua, swimmer Edgar Iro, and weightlifter Mary Kini Lifu. Firisua and Iro qualified through universality slots given by World Athletics and FINA respectively, while Lifu qualified by being the highest ranked Oceanian athlete in her category per the rankings given by the International Weightlifting Federation. Firisua and Iro were the flagbearers for the opening ceremony, while Lifu solely held the flag at the closing ceremony. None of the three athletes received a medal, and as of these Games, Solomon Islands had yet to earn an Olympic medal. Although not earning a medal, Solomon Islands stated that they considered their participation at these Games served as a learning ground for their hosting of the 2023 Pacific Games.

== Background ==
Originally scheduled to take place from 24 July to 9 August 2020, the Games were postponed to 23 July to 8 August 2021, due to the COVID-19 pandemic. This edition of the Games marked the nation's tenth appearance at the Summer Olympics since they debuted at the 1984 Summer Olympics held in Los Angeles, California, United States. The nation planned to use the Games as a "learning ground" for their hosting of the 2023 Pacific Games, to be held in the city of Honiara.

=== Travel ===
A coordination between the International Olympic Committee (IOC), the Oceania National Olympic Committees (ONOC) of Nauru, Kiribati, Solomon Islands, and Tuvalu, and Nauru Airlines, used the airline to charter two flights for the four national delegations of Nauru, Kiribati, Solomon Islands, and Tuvalu. Along the way, there was a technical stop in Chuuk State of the Federated States of Micronesia, before travel to Tokyo, due to precautions brought on by the COVID-19 pandemic. Delegations from Kiribati, Solomon Islands, and Tuvalu were brought to Nauru on 19 July 2021, while the following day saw all of the delegations' departure to the Haneda Airport in Tokyo.

Edgar Iro was the only person in the Solomon Islands delegation to not take part in the IOC chartered flight. He flew in from Thailand the same week of their departure.

=== Delegation ===
The Solomon Islands delegation was composed of nine people. Officials present were National Olympic Committee of Solomon Islands (NOCSI) president Martin Rara, NOCSI delegation general secretary Melinda Avosa, technical director Apollos Saeg, who was also called to be the weightlifting head coach, and chef de mission and Japanese government volunteer Naoyuki Fujiyama. Fujiyama's role in the delegation was controversial after multiple calls from Solomon Islands national sports federations for him to step down from his position due to alleged corruption and fraud, and the fact that he had breached the constitution of the NOCSI that "restricted non-citizens from participating in the administration of sports matters in Solomon Islands", as he was only a resident of the nation and not a citizen.

Coaches present were athletics head coach and two-time Olympian Francis Manioru, swimming head coach Stance Sanga, and Saeg. The athletes that competed were long-distance runner and 2016 Olympian Sharon Firisua, who competed in the women's marathon, swimmer Edgar Iro, who competed in the men's 100 m freestyle, and weightlifter Mary Kini Lifu, who competed in the women's 55 kg category. Weightlifter and two-time Olympian Jenly Tegu Wini was also expected to compete for the nation in the women's 59 kg category, but did not qualify after not tallying enough points for the rankings.

Firisua was the last Solomon Islands athlete to compete at the Games. No Solomon Islands athlete had earned an Olympic medal as of the 2020 Games.

The Solomon Islands delegation, besides Iro, returned to the nation 13 August 2021, after an act was signed by prime minister Manasseh Sogavare that allowed them to return to the country despite measures brought on by the COVID-19 pandemic that prohibited people from entering the country.

=== Opening and closing ceremonies ===
The Solomon Islands delegation marched 101st out of 206 countries in the 2020 Summer Olympics Parade of Nations within the opening ceremony, due to the host's use of the local kana alphabetical system. (Note: Japanese: ソロモン諸島, romanized: Soromon shotō) Firisua and Iro held the flag for the delegation in the ceremony. At the closing ceremony, Lifu was the designated flagbearer for the nation.

== Competitors ==
The following is the list of number of competitors in the Games.

Sport	Men	Women	Total
Athletics	0	1	1
Swimming	1	0	1
Weightlifting	0	1	1
Total	1	2	3

== Athletics ==
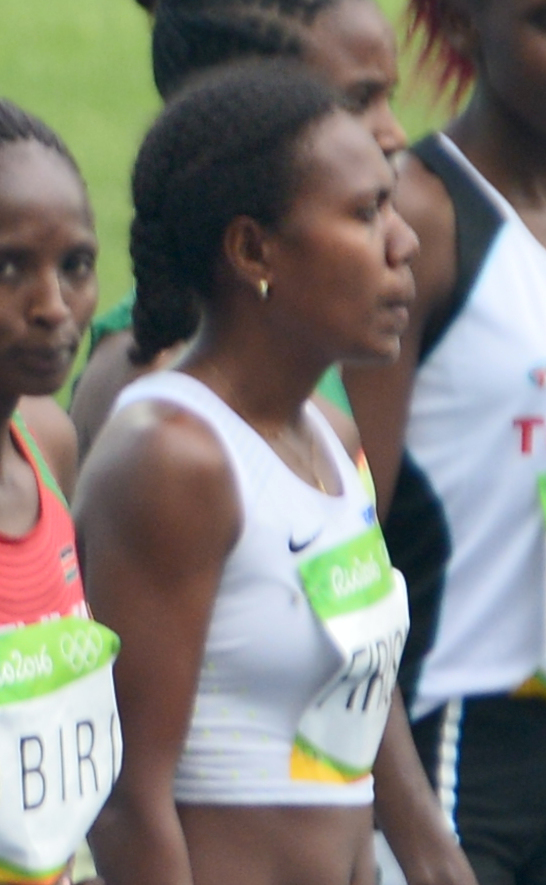
Firisua at the last Games held in Rio de Janeiro, Brazil, in the women's 5000 metres event

Solomon Islands received a universality slot from World Athletics to send a female athlete to the Olympics, which allows a National Olympic Committee to send athletes despite not meeting the standard qualification criteria. The nation selected long-distance runner and national record holder Sharon Firisua, who would be the first person from a Pacific Island nation to compete in the women's marathon at any edition of the Games. Firisua also competed in the last Olympic Games held in Rio de Janeiro, Brazil, where she competed in the women's 5000 metres and placed 15th in her heat, not advancing to the final. Before the Games, Firisua and her team aimed for her to beat her personal best of 3:08:56 and possibly run a time under 3 hours, targeting a time of 2:55:00.

Firisua was the last Pacific athlete to compete at the Games. She competed in her event on 7 August 2021 at 6:00 p.m., in Sapporo, Hokkaido, instead of Tokyo, after a decision made and approved by the International Olympic Committee. She ran a time of 3:02:10, setting a new national record, finishing 72nd out of 73 finishers and 88 overall competitors. Peres Jepchirchir of Kenya won the race and earned the gold medal.

Key

- Note–Ranks given for track events are within the athlete's heat only
- Q = Qualified for the next round
- q = Qualified for the next round as a fastest loser or, in field events, by position without achieving the qualifying target
- NR = National record
- N/A = Round not applicable for the event
- Bye = Athlete not required to compete in round

Track & road events

Athlete	Event	Final	
Athlete	Event	Result	Rank
Sharon Firisua	Women's marathon	3:02:10 NR	72

== Swimming ==
Solomon Islands received a universality invitation from FINA to send a male top-ranked swimmer in his respective individual events to the Olympics, based on the FINA Points System of 28 June 2021. The nation picked swimmer Edgar Iro, who competed in the men's 100 metre freestyle. Before the Games, Iro trained for his event in Thailand. He was the first ever swimmer to compete for Solomon Islands at the Olympic Games.

Iro competed in his event on 27 July 2021, in the first heat in the seventh lane. He finished second to last in his heat and placed last overall out of all of the finishers, (Note: Swimmer Matt Richards of Great Britain did not start.) finishing with a time of 1:00.13. Caeleb Dressel of the United States won the gold medal with an Olympic record-setting time of 47.02.

Athlete	Event	Heat		Semifinal		Final	
Athlete	Event	Time	Rank	Time	Rank	Time	Rank
Edgar Iro	Men's 100 m freestyle	1:00.13	70	Did not advance			

== Weightlifting ==
Solomon Islands entered one female weightlifter into Olympic competition. Mary Kini Lifu topped the list of weightlifters from Oceania in the women's 55 kg category based on the IWF Absolute Continental Rankings. Weightlifter and two-time Olympian Jenly Tegu Wini was also expected to compete for the nation in the women's 59 kg category, but did not qualify after not tallying enough points for the rankings. The lead-up to the Games saw Lifu's participation at the 2019 Pacific Games held in Apia, Samoa, where she won the gold medal in the same event. Before the Games, Lifu was granted an IOC scholarship, which allowed her to train at the Oceania Weightlifting Institute in New Caledonia. Due to the COVID-19 pandemic, she was sent back to her country but was then stranded at Nauru for three months because of regulations brought on by it. Once the other competitors flew in from Solomon Islands to Nauru, she flew to Tokyo in the IOC chartered airplane.

Lifu competed in her event on 26 July 2021 at 4:50 p.m. in the B Group. She lifted 64 kilograms for her first attempt in the snatch; she then failed 67 kilograms for her second attempt, then was successful in her third attempt at the same weight. She then lifted 84 kilograms for her first attempt in the clean and jerk; she then lifted 87 kilograms successfully for her second attempt, then failed at her third attempt at 90 kilograms. She placed last out of 14 competitors. The gold medal was earned by Hidilyn Diaz of the Philippines, setting new Olympic records in the clean and jerk, lifting 127 kilograms, and in the total with 224 kilograms.

But I would like to encourage women to take up sports. Sports is not all about winning and it's not only for men, sport is for all.

— Mary Kini Lifu, Kini Eyes Sharing Olympic Experience with Youths

The nation has one of the worst cases of gender inequality and domestic violence in the world, with 64% of women aged 15–49 having reported physical and/or sexual abuse by a partner. Lifu stated "the province I came [sic] from is male dominated, women are sometimes not allowed to take up sports because of cultural beliefs." Her performance in sport was hailed by NOCSI president Martin Rara, who said it would be a "statement for women back in the nation", stating that it could bring to light the experiences faced by women in a male-dominant nation. Upon her return to the nation, Lifu taught young lifters ideas and techniques from experience she gained from other lifters at the Games.

Athlete	Event	Snatch		Clean & Jerk		Total	Rank
Athlete	Event	Result	Rank	Result	Rank	Total	Rank
Mary Kini Lifu	Women's 55 kg	67	14	87	14	154	14
