= Solomon Islands at the 2016 Summer Olympics =

- Flag of the Solomon Islands
- IOC code: SOL
- NOC: National Olympic Committee of Solomon Islands
- Website: www.oceaniasport.com/solomon

in Rio de Janeiro
- Competitors: 3 in 2 sports
- Flag bearer: Jenly Tegu Wini
- Medals: Gold 0 Silver 0 Bronze 0 Total 0

Summer Olympics appearances (overview)
- 1984; 1988; 1992; 1996; 2000; 2004; 2008; 2012; 2016; 2020; 2024

The Solomon Islands competed at the 2016 Summer Olympics in Rio de Janeiro, Brazil, from 5 to 21 August 2016. This was the nation's ninth consecutive appearance at the Summer Olympics. The delegation included two track and field athletes – Rosefelo Siosi and Sharon Firisua – as well as weightlifter Jenly Tegu Wini. Wini was a returning competitor from the 2012 London Olympics and also led the delegation in those Games. The Solomon Islands, however, has yet to win its first Olympic medal.

== Background ==
The nation state of Solomon Islands comprises an archipelago of approximately a thousand islands that serves as home to almost 600,000 people. The islands were designated a protectorate of the United Kingdom in the 1890s, and remained under British control during World War II, where the archipelago was the centre of some of the war's worst fighting. In 1976, the British Solomon Islands Protectorate won the right to self-government, and declared independence in 1978 under the name Solomon Islands. The nation fell into a period of civil instability between then and 2003, when Australia led a multi-disciplinary mission, the Regional Assistance Mission to Solomon Islands (RAMSI) to restore law and order in the country.

The Solomon Islands participated in nine Summer Olympics between their debut in the 1984 Summer Olympics in Los Angeles, California, and the 2016 Summer Olympics in Rio de Janeiro, Brazil. The highest number of Solomon Islanders participating any single Summer Games was four at the 1988, 1996, and 2012 Summer Olympics. No Solomon Islander has ever won a medal at any Games. The Solomon Islands have never competed in the Winter Olympics. All Solomon Islanders participated through wildcard slots from the International Association of Athletics Federations and International Weightlifting Federation. Jenly Tegu Wini was chosen to be the nation's flagbearer during the parade of nations of the opening ceremony while Rosefelo Siosi bore it during the closing ceremony.

== Athletics ==
The Solomon Islands have received universality slots from IAAF to send two athletes (one male and one female) to the Olympics.

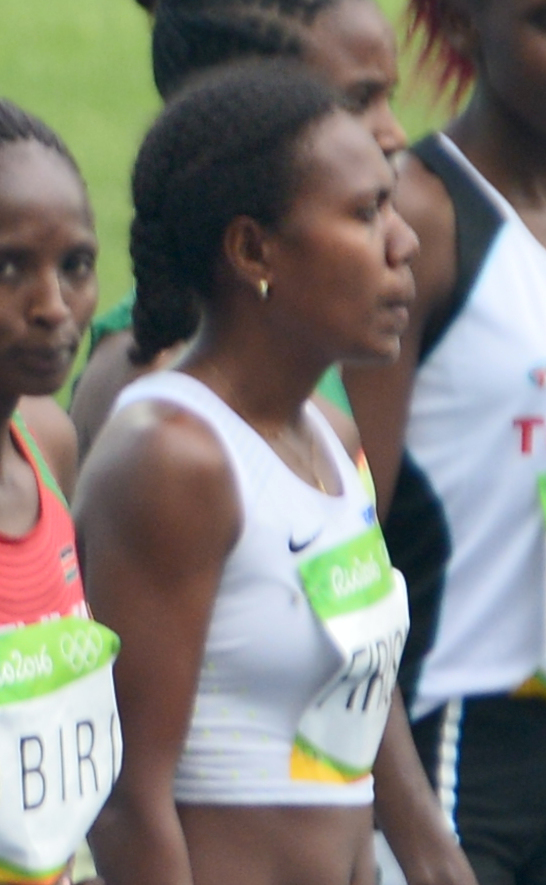
Sharon Firisua in the first round of the women's 5000m

Key

- Note–Ranks given for track events are within the athlete's heat only
- Q = Qualified for the next round
- q = Qualified for the next round as a fastest loser or, in field events, by position without achieving the qualifying target
- NR = National record
- N/A = Round not applicable for the event
- Bye = Athlete not required to compete in round

Track & road events

Athlete	Event	Heat		Final	
Athlete	Event	Time	Rank	Time	Rank
Rosefelo Siosi	Men's 5000 m	15:47.76	25	did not advance	
Sharon Firisua	Women's 5000 m	18:01.62	15	did not advance	

== Weightlifting ==
Jenly Tegu Wini participated on the Solomon Islands' behalf in the women's lightweight (58 kilogram) weightlifting competition. Wini qualified through an unused quota place from the IWF to send a female weightlifter to the Olympics. Wini had participated in the previous 2012 Summer Olympics in the same category, finishing 17th. She had previously won three silver medals in the women 69 kg weightlifting event of the 2009 Pacific Mini Games in Rarotonga, albeit the bronze medal was not awarded due to insufficient competitors. Her event took place on 9 March, and included 15 other athletes. During the snatch phase of the event, Wini succeeded in her first two attempts of lifting 80 kilograms (180 lb) and 84 kilograms (185 lb), but failed her third attempt of 87 kilograms (192 lb), ranking fourteenth. In the event's clean and jerk phase, Wini repeated the pattern of the snatch stage, successfully lifting her first two attempts of 100 kilograms (220 lb) and 104 kilograms (229 lb) but failing to lift 109 kilograms (240 lb). She finished fifteenth with a total of 188 kilograms (414 lb), 52 points under gold medalist Sukanya Srisurat and 26 points ahead of Ayesha Albalooshi.

Athlete	Event	Snatch		Clean & Jerk		Total	Rank
Athlete	Event	Result	Rank	Result	Rank	Total	Rank
Jenly Tegu Wini	Women's −58 kg	84	14	104	13	188	15
