= Solomon Islands at the 2019 World Aquatics Championships =

- Flag of Solomon Islands
- FINA code: SOL

in Gwangju, South Korea
- Medals: Gold 0 Silver 0 Bronze 0 Total 0

World Aquatics Championships appearances
- 2019; 2022; 2023; 2024

Solomon Islands competed at the 2019 World Aquatics Championships in Gwangju, South Korea from 12 to 28 July.

== Swimming ==
Solomon Islands entered two swimmers.

Men

Athlete	Event	Heat		Semifinal		Final	
Athlete	Event	Time	Rank	Time	Rank	Time	Rank
Edgar Iro	100 m freestyle	1:00.98	113	did not advance			
Edgar Iro	50 m butterfly	29.40	82	did not advance			
Clayment Lafiara	50 m freestyle	27.39	116	did not advance			
Clayment Lafiara	50 m breaststroke	34.37	67	did not advance			
