= Solomon Islands at the Olympics =

- Flag of Solomon Islands
- IOC code: SOL
- NOC: National Olympic Committee of Solomon Islands
- Website: www.oceaniasport.com/solomon
- Medals: Gold 0 Silver 0 Bronze 0 Total 0

Summer appearances
- 1984; 1988; 1992; 1996; 2000; 2004; 2008; 2012; 2016; 2020; 2024

Solomon Islands first participated at the Olympic Games in 1984, and has sent athletes to compete in every Summer Olympic Games since then. The nation has never participated in the Winter Olympic Games.

To date, no athlete competing for Solomon Islands has ever won an Olympic medal.

The National Olympic Committee for Solomon Islands was created in 1983 and recognized by the International Olympic Committee that same year.

== Medal tables ==
=== Medals by Summer Games ===
Games	Athletes	Gold	Silver	Bronze	Total	Rank
(United States) 1984 Los Angeles	3	0	0	0	0	–
(South Korea) 1988 Seoul	4	0	0	0	0	–
(Spain) 1992 Barcelona	1	0	0	0	0	–
(United States) 1996 Atlanta	4	0	0	0	0	–
(Australia) 2000 Sydney	2	0	0	0	0	–
(Greece) 2004 Athens	2	0	0	0	0	–
(China) 2008 Beijing	3	0	0	0	0	–
(United Kingdom) 2012 London	4	0	0	0	0	–
(Brazil) 2016 Rio de Janeiro	3	0	0	0	0	–
(Japan) 2020 Tokyo	3	0	0	0	0	–
(France) 2024 Paris	2	0	0	0	0	–
(United States) 2028 Los Angeles	future event					
(Australia) 2032 Brisbane	future event					
Total		0	0	0	0	–

== See also ==
- List of flag bearers for Solomon Islands at the Olympics
- Category:Olympic competitors for the Solomon Islands
- Solomon Islands at the Commonwealth Games
- Solomon Islands at the Paralympics
