= John Maeke =

Solomon Islands athlete (born 1962)

Personal information
- Full name: John Maeke
- Nationality: Solomon Islands
- Born: June 6, 1962 (age 64)
- Height: 1.67 m (5 ft 6 in)
- Weight: 55 kg (121 lb)

Sport
- Sport: Athletics

John Maeke (born 6 June 1962) is a retired long distance athlete from the Solomon Islands. He was a part of the Solomon Islands team at the 1988 Summer Olympics in Seoul, where he qualified in the 10,000 metres and marathon races.

Maeke is from the Guadalcanal Province of the Solomon Islands.

Maeke qualified for the inaugural 1990 Oceania Athletics Championships, where he placed 10th in the 1500 m and 6th in the 3000 metres steeplechase finals. At the following year's 1991 South Pacific Games in Papua New Guinea, Maeke improved his placing to 4th in the 3000 m steeplechase final.

At the 1988 Olympics, Maeke finished 22nd in his 10,000 m heat and failed to advance to the finals. In the marathon, he started but didn't finish the race.

In 2020, Maeke was inducted into the inaugural Solomon Islands Athletes Commission Hall of Fame class. As part of this process photos, important details, and stories about Maeke were put on display in the Solomon Islands National Olympic Committee.
