= Weightlifting at the 1984 Summer Olympics – Men's 67.5 kg =

Weightlifting at the Olympics

Men's 67.5 kg at the Games of the XXIII Olympiad
- Venue: Albert Gersten Pavilion
- Date: 1 August 1984
- Competitors: 19 from 17 nations

Medalists
1st place, gold medalist(s)		Yao Jingyuan	China
2nd place, silver medalist(s)		Andrei Socaci	Romania
3rd place, bronze medalist(s)		Jouni Grönman	Finland

The Men's Lightweight Weightlifting Event (–67.5 kg) was the fourth lightest event at the weightlifting competition. Each weightlifter had three attempts for both the snatch and clean and jerk lifting methods. The total of the best successful lift of each method was used to determine the final rankings and medal winners. Competition took place on 1 August in the 4,500 capacity Albert Gersten Pavilion. The weightlifter from China won the gold, with a combined lift of 320 kg.

== Results ==
Rank	Athlete	Group	Body weight	Snatch (kg)				Clean & Jerk (kg)				Total (kg)
Rank	Athlete	Group	Body weight	1	2	3	Result	1	2	3	Result	Total (kg)
1st place, gold medalist(s)	Yao Jingyuan (CHN)	A	67.20	135.0	140.0	142.5	142.5	172.5	177.5	~~180.0~~	177.5	320.0
2nd place, silver medalist(s)	Andrei Socaci (ROU)	A	67.10	135.0	140.0	142.5	142.5	165.0	170.0	~~172.5~~	170.0	312.5
3rd place, bronze medalist(s)	Jouni Grönman (FIN)	A	67.20	140.0	~~145.0~~	~~145.0~~	140.0	172.5	~~177.5~~	~~180.0~~	172.5	312.5
4	Dean Willey (GBR)	A	67.85	135.0	140.0	~~142.5~~	140.0	165.0	170.0	~~172.5~~	170.0	310.0
5	Choji Taira (JPN)	A	67.20	125.0	130.0	132.5	132.5	165.0	170.0	172.5	172.5	305.0
6	Yasushige Sasaki (JPN)	A	67.15	135.0	140.0	~~142.5~~	140.0	157.5	162.5	~~167.5~~	162.5	302.5
7	Bill Stellios (AUS)	A	67.20	130.0	135.0	137.5	137.5	165.0	~~170.0~~	~~170.0~~	165.0	302.5
8	Ma Jianping (CHN)	A	67.25	~~130.0~~	130.0	~~135.0~~	130.0	~~167.5~~	167.5	~~172.5~~	167.5	297.5
9	Patrick Bassey (NGR)	B	66.70	125.0	132.5	~~137.5~~	132.5	~~155.0~~	155.0	162.5	162.5	295.0
10	Pietro Pujia (ITA)	B	67.40	~~120.0~~	120.0	127.5	127.5	155.0	162.5	~~165.0~~	162.5	290.0
11	Gregor Bialowas (AUT)	A	67.00	~~122.5~~	~~122.5~~	122.5	122.5	~~160.0~~	160.0	~~167.5~~	160.0	282.5
12	Fernando Mariaca (ESP)	B	66.80	122.5	~~127.5~~	~~127.5~~	122.5	152.5	157.5	~~162.5~~	157.5	280.0
13	Donald Abrahamson (USA)	B	67.35	115.0	120.0	122.5	122.5	150.0	155.0	~~157.5~~	155.0	277.5
14	Michael Norell (SWE)	B	67.30	~~120.0~~	120.0	~~125.0~~	120.0	152.5	~~157.5~~	~~157.5~~	152.5	272.5
15	Surendra Hamal (NEP)	B	64.95	~~102.5~~	102.5	~~107.5~~	102.5	132.5	~~137.5~~	~~137.5~~	132.5	235.0
16	Leslie Ata (SOL)	B	66.20	75.0	80.0	~~82.5~~	80.0	100.0	105.0	107.5	107.5	187.5
-	Claude Dallaire (CAN)	A	67.35	~~125.0~~	~~125.0~~	~~125.0~~	—	—	—	—	—	—
-	Antulio Delgado (GUA)	B	66.75	~~102.5~~	~~102.5~~	~~102.5~~	—	120.0	~~125.0~~	~~125.0~~	120.0	—
-	Hatem Bouabid (TUN)	B	67.05	~~110.0~~	~~110.0~~	~~110.0~~	—	135.0	~~140.0~~	~~140.0~~	135.0	—

== Sources ==
- 1984 Summer Olympics Official Report (PDF). IOC. 1984. p. 613. Archived from the original (PDF) on 17 October 2013.
