= Solomon Islands at the 2008 Summer Olympics =

- Flag of the Solomon Islands
- IOC code: SOL
- NOC: National Olympic Committee of Solomon Islands
- Website: www.oceaniasport.com/solomon

in Beijing
- Competitors: 3 in 2 sports
- Flag bearer: Wendy Hale
- Medals: Gold 0 Silver 0 Bronze 0 Total 0

Summer Olympics appearances (overview)
- 1984; 1988; 1992; 1996; 2000; 2004; 2008; 2012; 2016; 2020; 2024; 2028

The Solomon Islands send a team to compete at the 2008 Summer Olympics in Beijing, China. The country's delegation consisted of three athletes competing in two sports across three distinct events; Francis Manioru and Pauline Kwalea represented the Solomon Islands in track, while Wendy Hale competed in weightlifting. The arrival of the Solomon Islander delegation in Beijing marked its seventh appearance since its debut at the 1984 Summer Olympics in Los Angeles. The track athletes did not advance past the first rounds in their events. There were no medalists from the Solomon Islander athletes in these Games. Wendy Hale was the Solomon Islands' flagbearer during the Games' opening ceremony.

== Background ==
The Solomon Islands are a group consisting of approximately a thousand islands that serves as home to almost 600,000 people. The island chain was designated a protectorate of the United Kingdom in the 1890s, and remained under British control during World War II, where the island chain was the center of some of the war's worst fighting. In 1976, the Solomon Islands won the right to self-government from the British, and declared independence in 1978. The nation fell into a period of civil instability between then and 2003, when Australia led a military force to restore law and order in the country.

The first Solomon Islander delegation to the Olympics arrived some six years after the nation's independence for the 1984 Summer Olympics in Los Angeles, California, and was composed of three male athletes competing in two sports. The island nation continued to send delegations to the Olympics throughout its era of civil disorder; delegations from the Solomon Islands appeared at all seven Summer Olympic games prior to (and including) the Beijing games of 2008. The first women represented the Solomon Islands at the 1996 Summer Olympics in Atlanta, Georgia. The largest delegations from the Solomon Islands included four athletes and appeared in 1988 and 1996. Up to and including the Beijing games, there had not been a Solomon Islander who had won a medal at the Olympics.

During the 2008 Summer Olympics, three athletes (one male and two female) participated across two sports in three distinct events. Pauline Kwalea, the year's female sprinter, was the youngest member of the delegation at 20 years old. Male sprinter Francis Manioru, at 26 years old, was the oldest. Weightlifter Wendy Hale bore the flag of the Solomon Islands at the ceremonies.

== Athletics ==
Sprinter Francis Manioru represented the Solomon Islands at Beijing in the men's 100 meters dash as its only male track and field athlete. Born in September 1981, Manioru was 22 years old when he first competed in the men's 100 meters dash at the 2004 Olympics in Athens. He ranked seventh in his heat and did not advance past the qualification round. However, Manioru returned as a 26-year-old to participate in the 2008 Olympics. During the qualification round of the event, which took place on 14 August, Manioru was placed in the first heat against seven other athletes. He finished the race in 11.09 seconds, placing behind ni-Vanuatu sprinter Moses Kamut (10.81 seconds), who in turn placed behind Surinamese sprinter Jurgen Themen (10.61 seconds). The heat was led by Jamaica's Usain Bolt (10.20 seconds) and Antigua and Barbuda's Daniel Bailey (10.24 seconds). Manioru ranked 68th out of the 80 athletes participating in the qualification heats. Manioru did not advance to later rounds.

Pauline Kwalea represented the Solomon Islands in the women's 100 meters dash at the Beijing Olympics. She was born in the national capital of Honiara, located on the island of Guadalcanal, and represented the Solomon Islands in Beijing as a 20-year-old. Kwalea had not previously competed in any Olympic games. During the course of the qualification round of the event, which took place on 15 August, Kwalea was placed in the sixth heat against eight other athletes. She finished last with a time of 13.28 seconds. Nicaraguan runner Jessica Aguilera placed ahead of Kwalea (13.15 seconds), while Andorra's Montserrat Pujol ranked ahead of Aguilera (12.73 seconds). The heat was led by Jamaican sprinter Shelly-Ann Fraser (11.35 seconds) and Ghana's Vida Anim (11.47 seconds). In the qualification heats, there were 85 participants, with Kwalea ranking 75th. She did not advance to later rounds.

Men

Athlete	Event	Heat		Quarterfinal		Semifinal		Final	
Athlete	Event	Result	Rank	Result	Rank	Result	Rank	Result	Rank
Francis Manioru	100 m	11.09	8	Did not advance					

Women

Athlete	Event	Heat		Quarterfinal		Semifinal		Final	
Athlete	Event	Result	Rank	Result	Rank	Result	Rank	Result	Rank
Pauline Kwalea	100 m	13.28	7	Did not advance					

Key

- Note–Ranks given for track events are within the athlete's heat only
- Q = Qualified for the next round
- q = Qualified for the next round as a fastest loser or, in field events, by position without achieving the qualifying target
- NR = National record
- N/A = Round not applicable for the event
- Bye = Athlete not required to compete in round

== Weightlifting ==
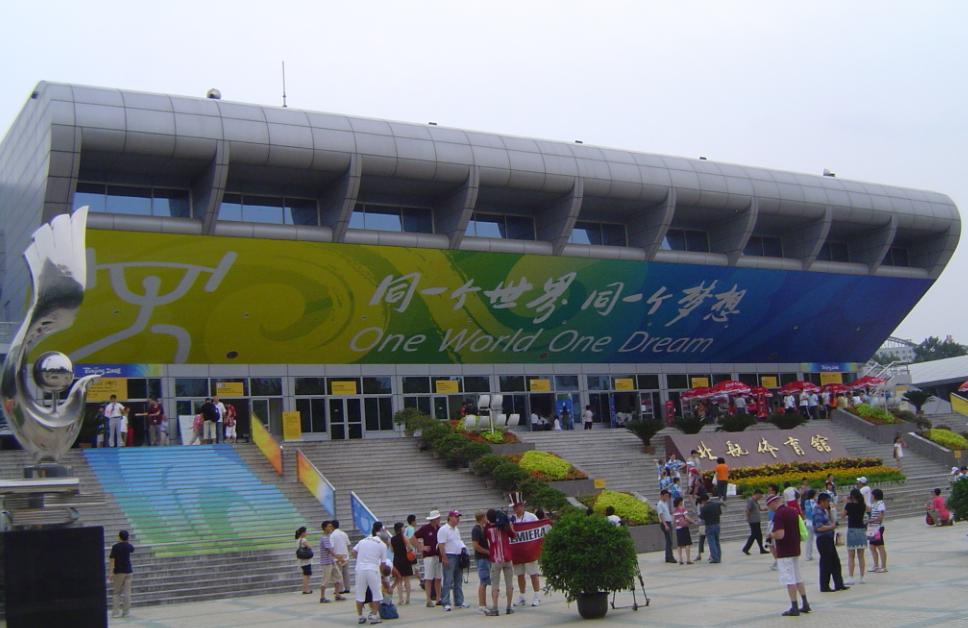
The Beihang University Gymnasium, where Hale participated in her event

Wendy Hale represented the Solomon Islands at the Beijing Olympics, participating in the women's lightweight division of weightlifting which encompasses athletes who weigh under 58 kilograms. Born on Malaita, the most populous of the Solomon Islands, Hale was 20 years old when she participated at the 2008 Olympics. She had not previously competed in any Olympic games. During the course of the event, which took place on 11 August, Hale faced eleven other athletes. She was the only athlete in the event from the entire region of Oceania.

During the snatch phase of the event, Hale was given three attempts to lift as much weight as she could in snatches. She successfully lifted 74 kilograms on her first attempt and 78 kilograms on her second, but failed to lift 82 kilograms on her third and final try. The second and last part of the event included lifting weights using the clean and jerk method. Hale successfully lifted 95 kilograms in this manner on her first attempt, but failed to lift 100 kilograms on her second and third tries. Her combined score was 173 kilograms. This placed the Solomon Islander at twelfth place of the twelve athletes in the event, directly behind the Philippines' eleventh-place finalist Hidilyn Diaz (192 kilograms), who in turn ranked behind Poland's tenth-place finalist Marieta Gotfryd (200 kilograms). The gold medalist in the event was China's Chen Yanqing, who set an Olympic record with 244 kilograms.

Athlete	Event	Snatch		Clean & Jerk		Total	Rank
Athlete	Event	Result	Rank	Result	Rank	Total	Rank
Wendy Hale	Women's −58 kg	78	12	95	12	173	11
