= Solomon Islands at the 2023 World Aquatics Championships =

- Flag of Solomon Islands
- FINA code: SOL
- National federation: Solomon Islands Swimming Federation

in Fukuoka, Japan
- Competitors: 1 in 1 sport
- Medals: Gold 0 Silver 0 Bronze 0 Total 0

World Aquatics Championships appearances
- 2019; 2022; 2023; 2024

Solomon Islands is set to compete at the 2023 World Aquatics Championships in Fukuoka, Japan from 14 to 30 July.

== Swimming ==
Solomon Islands entered 2 swimmers.

Men

| Athlete | Event | Heat | | Semifinal | | Final | |
| Athlete | Event | Time | Rank | Time | Rank | Time | Rank |
|---|---|---|---|---|---|---|---|
| Edgar Iro | 50 metre freestyle | 27.28 | 102 | Did not advance | | | |
| Edgar Iro | 100 metre freestyle | 59.94 | 108 | Did not advance | | | |
