= Claude Dallaire =

Canadian weightlifter (born 1960)

Personal information
- Born: 29 May 1960 (age 66) Montmagny, Quebec, Canada

Sport
- Sport: Weightlifting

Claude Dallaire (born 29 May 1960) is a Canadian weightlifter. He competed in the men's lightweight event at the 1984 Summer Olympics.
