= Antulio Delgado =

Guatemalan weightlifter

Personal information
- Nationality: Guatemalan
- Born: 4 October 1961 (age 63)

Sport
- Sport: Weightlifting

Antulio Delgado (born 4 October 1961) is a Guatemalan weightlifter. He competed in the men's lightweight event at the 1984 Summer Olympics.
