= Michael Norell (weightlifter) =

Swedish weightlifter

Personal information
- Nationality: Swedish
- Born: 31 August 1960 (age 64); Stockholm, Sweden

Sport
- Sport: Weightlifting

Michael Norell (born 31 August 1960) is a Swedish weightlifter. He competed in the men's lightweight event at the 1984 Summer Olympics.
