= 1999 Oceania Youth Athletics Championships =

IV Oceania Youth Athletics Championships
- Dates: July 2–3
- Host city: Santa Rita, Guam
- Level: Youth
- Events: 30 (15 boys, 15 girls)
- Participation: 116 (62 boys, 54 girls) athletes from 17 nations

The 1999 Oceania Youth Athletics Championships were held in Santa Rita, Guam, between July 2–3, 1999. A total of 30 events were contested, 15 by boys and 15 by girls.

== Medal summary ==
Complete results can be found on the Athletics Weekly, and on the World Junior Athletics History webpages.

=== Boys under 18 (Youth) ===
Event	Gold		Silver		Bronze	
100 metres (wind: 0.0m/s)	Kelly Olegerill (PLW)	11.09	Chris Rushton (NZL)	11.22	Adam Comincioli (AUS)	11.29
200 metres (wind: -0.3m/s)	James Maela (SOL)	22.82	Hayden Townsend (NZL)	22.89	Jeremy Firth (AUS)	22.91
400 metres	(French Polynesia) /Turo Bourgery (TAH)	50.23	Linton Mani Oeta (SOL)	51.80	Darrell Bradford (GUM)	52.25
800 metres	Loresh Kumaran (FIJ)	1:59.06	Jimmy Jacob (PNG)	2:01.28	James McLauchlan (NZL)	2:01.54
1500 metres	Wilson Seda (SOL)	4:17.50	Russell Hasu (PNG)	4:18.85	Glenn Hughes (NZL)	4:19.92
3000 metres	Russell Hasu (PNG)	9:27.81	Sapolai Yao (PNG)	9:28.67	Glenn Hughes (NZL)	9:33.51
110 metres hurdles (wind: -0.3m/s)	Damien Daly (AUS)	14.19	Peter Cox (NZL)	15.77	(French Polynesia) /Vincent Carreau (TAH)	16.19
400 metres hurdles	Darrell Bradford (GUM)	57.05	Kurt Sayed (AUS)	58.52	(French Polynesia) /Vincent Carreau (TAH)	1:01.00
High jump	Shaun Fletcher (AUS)	1.88	Sam Fullman (FIJ)	1.85	Colin McFadden (NZL)	1.85
Long jump	Adam Comincioli (AUS)	6.65	David Lane (NZL)	6.56	Peter Cox (NZL)	6.51
Triple jump	Colin McFadden (NZL)	14.01	(French Polynesia) /Christophe Lai (TAH)	13.26	David Lane (NZL)	13.23
Shot put	(French Polynesia) /Heifara Taumaa (TAH)	14.77	Pio Fihaki (FIJ)	14.57	Bradley Burt (AUS)	14.20
Discus throw	(French Polynesia) /Heifara Taumaa (TAH)	47.66	Damien Daly (AUS)	44.26	Pio Fihaki (FIJ)	43.97
Javelin throw	Tim Rozborski (GUM)	44.62	Lee Cummings (NFK)	42.41	Titimanu Simi (SAM)	39.04
800 metres Medley relay (100m x 100m x 200m x 400m)	New Zealand	1:37.22	Australia	1:38.21	Solomon Islands	1:38.73

=== Girls under 18 (Youth) ===
Event	Gold		Silver		Bronze	
100 metres (wind: 0.0m/s)	Kate Smith (AUS)	12.58	Della Marava (PNG)	12.67	Seruwaia Tukana (FIJ)	13.05
200 metres (wind: 0.0m/s)	Della Marava (PNG)	26.18	Seruwaia Tukana (FIJ)	26.61	Jenny Keni (SOL)	27.97
400 metres	Lorraine Bailey (PNG)	61.64	Rosalia Karalaini (FIJ)	63.02	Natasha Marsters (COK)	64.27
800 metres	Lisa Corrigan (AUS)	2:20.01	(French Polynesia) /Hélène Guet (TAH)	2:27.57	Jennybree Tollestrup (NMI)	2:29.70
1500 metres	Lisa Corrigan (AUS)	4:38.78	Vanessa Jackson (NZL)	4:41.83	Amanda Berghofer (AUS)	5:00.15
3000 metres	Vanessa Jackson (NZL)	10:09.15	Lisa Corrigan (AUS)	10:29.63	Amanda Berghofer (AUS)	11:02.08
100 metres hurdles (wind: -0.6m/s)	Sophie Chiet (NZL)	16.02	(French Polynesia) /Temoemoe Faremiro (TAH)	17.97	Charlene Flores (GUM)	18.07
400 metres hurdles	Sophie Chiet (NZL)	71.07	(French Polynesia) /Temoemoe Faremiro (TAH)	77.17	Lilibeth Diaz (GUM)	78.75
High jump	Tiffany Pickford (NZL)	1.66	Jolina Uwiak (PNG)	1.50		
Long jump	Sophie Chiet (NZL)	5.10	Aubrey Posadas (GUM)	5.00	Kate Smith (AUS)	4.98
Triple jump	Sophie Chiet (NZL)	10.81	Rachel Lennie (PNG)	10.50	Jolina Uwiak (PNG)	10.30
Shot put	Monique Taito (NZL)	12.87	Amerita Ranadi (FIJ)	11.27	Andrea McBride (NZL)	11.14
Discus throw	Tereapii Tapoki (COK)	34.22	Monique Taito (NZL)	30.86	Amerita Ranadi (FIJ)	27.67
Javelin throw	Andrea McBride (NZL)	45.44	Alicia Utschink (AUS)	41.98	Kate Smith (AUS)	38.41
800 metres Medley relay (100m x 100m x 200m x 400m)	Australia	1:53.79	Papua New Guinea	1:56.26	New Zealand	2:00.40

== Medal table (unofficial) ==
* Host nation (Guam)

Rank	Nation	Gold	Silver	Bronze	Total
1	New Zealand (NZL)	10	6	8	24
2	Australia (AUS)	7	5	7	19
3	Papua New Guinea (PNG)	3	7	1	11
4	French Polynesia (TAH)	3	4	2	9
5	Guam (GUM)*	2	1	3	6
6	Solomon Islands (SOL)	2	1	2	5
7	Fiji (FIJ)	1	5	3	9
8	Cook Islands (COK)	1	0	1	2
9	Palau (PLW)	1	0	0	1
10	Norfolk Island (NFK)	0	1	0	1
11	Northern Mariana Islands (NMI)	0	0	1	1
11	Samoa (SAM)	0	0	1	1
Totals (12 entries)		30	30	29	89

== Participation (unofficial) ==
An unofficial count yields the number of about 116 athletes from 17 countries:

- American Samoa (4)
- Australia (10)
- Cook Islands (7)
- Fiji (7)
- Guam (19)
- Kiribati (5)
- Federated States of Micronesia (5)
- Nauru (1)
- New Zealand (12)
- Norfolk Island (5)
- Northern Mariana Islands (6)
- Palau (4)
- Papua New Guinea (8)
- Samoa (3)
- Solomon Islands (5)
- (French Polynesia) /Tahiti (9)
- Vanuatu (6)
