= Lisa Corrigan =

Australian middle-distance runner

Personal information
- Nickname: Ruby
- Nationality: Australia
- Born: 2 December 1984 (age 41) Blacktown, New South; Wales, Australia
- Height: 1.66 m (5 ft 5 1/2 in)
- Weight: 48 kg (106 lb)

Sport
- Sport: Athletics
- Event: Middle distance running
- Club: Weston Creek Athletics Club
- Coached by: Dick Telford
- Retired: 2013

Achievements and titles
- Olympic finals: 1500m Olympic Semi Finalist 2008
- World finals: 1500m World Champs Semi Finalist 2007 1500m Finalist Commonwealth Games 2006
- Personal bests: 800 m: 2:01.59 (2007); 1500 m: 4:05.25 (2007); 3000 m: 9:00.34 (2006) One mile: 4.22.6 (Australian record).
Medal record
Women's athletics
Representing Australia
Oceania Youth Championships
Gold medal – first place	1999 Santa Rita	800 m
Gold medal – first place	1999 Santa Rita	1500 m
Silver medal – second place	1999 Santa Rita	3000 m

Lisa Corrigan (born 2 December 1984 in Blacktown, New South Wales) is an Australian middle-distance runner and the current Australian record holder over the one mile where she set a time of 4.22.6 in 2007. She set her personal best time of 4:05.25, by winning the women's 1500 metres at the Telstra Athletics Series in Sydney. She ran a personal best to beat Tamsyn Lewis over the 800m in 2007 in 2.01.5. She has represented Australia at the Oceania championships 1999, youth commonwealth games 2000, World youth championships 2001, Ekiden relays, Melbourne commonwealth Games 2006, world championships 2007 and Olympic Games 2008.

Corrigan represented Australia at the 2008 Summer Olympics in Beijing, where she competed in the 1500 metres. She ran in the second heat against ten other athletes, including Ukraine's Iryna Lishchynska, who eventually won the silver medal in the final. She finished the race in ninth place by twenty-seven hundredths of a second (0.27) behind United States' Erin Donohue, outside her personal best time of 4:16.32.

Corrigan has been Australian champion over 800m & 1500m numerous times in her career and has won many road running races in the process. Corrigan attempted to qualify for the 2012 London Olympic Games over the 5000m however she ruptured her achillies tendon and has battled this persistent Achilles injury which saw her retire from the sport in 2013.

Corrigan has since worked for in development Athletics NSW and been a PE teacher at various schools over the years. Her biggest achievement to date has been marrying her best friend Dean Sintonen and the birth of their first daughter, Harper.

== Achievements ==
Year	Competition	Venue	Position	Event	Notes
Representing Australia
1999	Oceania Youth Championships	Santa Rita, Guam	1st	800 m	2:20.01
1999	Oceania Youth Championships	Santa Rita, Guam	1st	1500 m	4:38.78
1999	Oceania Youth Championships	Santa Rita, Guam	2nd	3000 m	10:29.63

2000 Junior Commonwealth Games, 800m, Silver. 2001 World Youth Championships, 800m, 5th place 2006 Commonwealth Games, 1500m, Finalist 11th 2007 World Championships, 1500m, Semi Finalist, 8th 2008 Olympic Games, Semi Finalist, 9th
