= Swimming at the 2024 Summer Olympics – Women's 50-metre freestyle =

Women's 50-metre freestyle at the Games of the XXXIII Olympiad
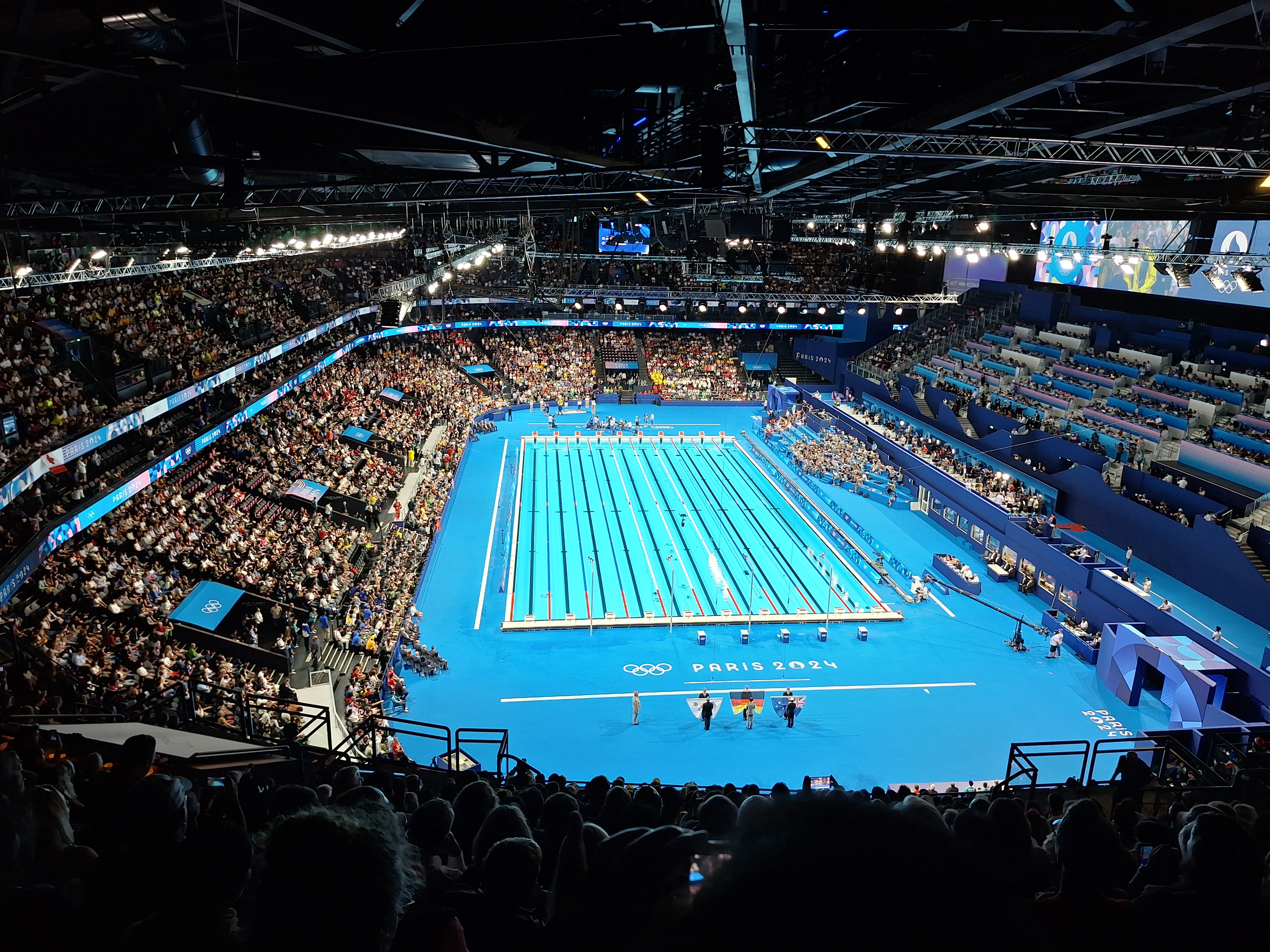
- Paris La Défense Arena after it was converted to a swimming pool for the swimming events
- Venue: Paris La Défense Arena
- Dates: 3 August 2024 (Heats and Semis); 4 August 2024 (Final)
- Competitors: 79 from 72 nations
- Winning time: 23.71

Medalists
1st place, gold medalist(s)		Sarah Sjöström	Sweden
2nd place, silver medalist(s)		Meg Harris	Australia
3rd place, bronze medalist(s)		Zhang Yufei	China

The women's 50-metre freestyle event at the 2024 Summer Olympics was held from 3 to 4 August 2024 at Paris La Défense Arena, which was converted to a swimming pool for the swimming events.

Sweden's Sarah Sjöström was the favourite going into the event and set a new Olympic record of 23.66 seconds in the semifinals to qualify as the top seed. In the final, Sjöström won gold, Australia's Meg Harris won silver, and China's Zhang Yufei won bronze, finishing ahead of Gretchen Walsh of the United States by 0.01 seconds. Slovenia's Neža Klančar set new national records in her heat, semifinal and in the final.

== Background ==
Three of the top four finishers in the event at the 2020 Games were not competing, including Australia's Emma McKeon, who had won the 2020 gold medal in Olympic record time of 23.81. SwimSwam and Swimming World opined that Sweden's Sarah Sjöström was the favourite, with her having set the world record of 23.61 at the 2023 World Swimming Championships and owning the 27 fastest times among all swimmers potentially competing in the race. Three days before the event started, Sjöström had won the 100 metre freestyle. The event was held at Paris La Défense Arena, which was converted to a swimming pool for the swimming events.

== Qualification ==
Each National Olympic Committee (NOC) was permitted to enter a maximum of two qualified athletes in each individual event but only if both of them had attained the Olympic Qualifying Time (OQT). For this event, the OQT was 24.70 seconds. World Aquatics then filled the rest of the event places with athletes qualifying through universality; NOCs were given one event entry for each gender, which could be used by any athlete regardless of qualification time, providing the spaces had not already been taken by athletes from that nation who had achieved the OQT. In total, 24 athletes qualified through achieving the OQT, while 55 athletes qualified through universality places.

Top 10 fastest qualification times
Swimmer	Country	Time	Competition
Sarah Sjöström	Sweden	23.61	2023 World Aquatics Championships
Katarzyna Wasick	Poland	23.95	2024 World Aquatics Championships
Shayna Jack	Australia	23.99	2024 Australian Olympic Trials
Gretchen Walsh	United States	24.06	2024 United States Olympic Trials
Simone Manuel	United States	24.13	2024 United States Olympic Trials
Zhang Yufei	China	24.15	2023 World Aquatics Championships
Wu Qingfeng	China	24.22	2024 Chinese National Championships
Meg Harris	Australia	24.26	2024 Australian Olympic Trials
Michelle Coleman	Sweden	24.43	2024 Sette Colli Trophy
Taylor Ruck	Canada	24.50	2024 World Aquatics Championships

== Heats ==
Ten heats took place on 3 August 2024, starting at 11:00. (Note: All times are Central European Summer Time (UTC+2)) The swimmers with the best 16 times in the heats advanced to the semifinals. Sjöström clocked 23.85 seconds, qualifying as the fastest seed with the only swim under 24 seconds. Katarzyna Wasick of Poland and Gretchen Walsh of the United States qualified with the second and third seeds, respectively. Simone Manuel from the United States, the 2016 silver medalist, did not qualify for the semifinals. Kenya's Maria Brunlehner set her country's national record at 25.82, Slovenia's Neža Klančar set a national record of 24.64, and Elizaveta Pecherskikh of Kyrgyzstan set a national record of 26.26.

María José Ribera from Bolivia, who had failed to qualify in 28th place, was disqualified after the International Testing Agency reported she had tested positive for furosemide, a prohibited substance.

Results
Rank	Heat	Lane	Swimmer	Nation	Time	Notes
1	10	4	Sarah Sjöström	Sweden	23.85	Q
2	9	4	Katarzyna Wasick	Poland	24.27	Q
3	10	5	Gretchen Walsh	United States	24.37	Q
4	8	4	Shayna Jack	Australia	24.38	Q
5	9	3	Meg Harris	Australia	24.50	Q
6	8	5	Zhang Yufei	China	24.54	Q
7	8	3	Michelle Coleman	Sweden	24.55	Q
8	10	3	Wu Qingfeng	China	24.57	Q
8	10	6	Taylor Ruck	Canada	24.57	Q
10	8	6	Béryl Gastaldello	France	24.60	Q
11	8	8	Julie Kepp Jensen	Denmark	24.64	Q
11	9	8	Neža Klančar	Slovenia	24.64	Q, NR
13	8	2	Sara Curtis	Italy	24.67	Q
14	8	7	Florine Gaspard	Belgium	24.69	Q
15	9	6	Anna Hopkin	Great Britain	24.72	Q
15	9	7	Valerie van Roon	Netherlands	24.72	Q
17	10	7	Theodora Drakou	Greece	24.80	
18	9	1	Kim Busch	Netherlands	24.87	
18	9	5	Simone Manuel	United States	24.87	
20	10	8	Kornelia Fiedkiewicz	Poland	24.94	
21	8	1	Danielle Hill	Ireland	25.02	
22	10	2	Mélanie Henique	France	25.05	
23	7	4	Jenjira Srisaard	Thailand	25.18	
24	9	2	Petra Senánszky	Hungary	25.21	
25	10	1	Jana Pavalic	Croatia	25.24	
26	7	5	Anicka Delgado	Ecuador	25.43	
27	7	2	Maria Brunlehner	Kenya	25.82	NR
~~28~~	7	3	~~María José Ribera~~	Bolivia	~~26.07~~	DQ
29	7	6	Sabrina Lyn	Jamaica	26.08	
30	6	7	Elizaveta Pecherskikh	Kyrgyzstan	26.26	NR
31	7	7	Rhanishka Gibbs	Bahamas	26.27	
32	7	1	Mia Phiri	Zambia	26.49	
32	7	8	Chloë Farro	Aruba	26.49	
34	6	1	Adaku Nwandu	Nigeria	26.62	NR
35	6	5	Mariam Sheikhalizadeh	Azerbaijan	26.76	
36	6	3	Joselle Mensah	Ghana	26.81	
37	6	2	Anahira McCutcheon	Fiji	26.88	
38	6	4	Apsara Sakbun	Cambodia	26.90	
39	6	8	Antsa Rabejaona	Madagascar	27.12	NR
40	5	3	Jovana Kuljaca	Montenegro	27.19	NR
41	5	7	Christina Rach	Eritrea	27.20	
42	5	4	Kennice Aphenie Greene	Saint Vincent and the Grenadines	27.23	
43	6	6	Hana Beiqi	Kosovo	27.34	
44	5	5	Georgia-Leigh Vele	Papua New Guinea	27.61	
45	5	2	Ionnah Eliane Douillet	Benin	27.64	
46	4	4	Noelie Annette Lacour	Gabon	27.68	
47	5	6	Khema Elizabeth	Seychelles	28.18	
48	5	1	Kaiya Brown	Samoa	28.31	
49	5	8	Sophia Latiff	Tanzania	28.42	
50	4	3	Hayley Wong	Brunei	28.52	
51	4	5	Noelani Day	Tonga	28.60	
52	4	6	Kestra Kihleng	Federated States of Micronesia	28.81	NR
53	4	2	Ekaterina Bordachyova	Tajikistan	28.85	NR
54	4	8	Loane Russet	Vanuatu	28.86	NR
55	4	7	Tayamika Chang'anamuno	Malawi	29.32	
56	4	1	Aishath Ulya Shaig	Maldives	29.39	
57	2	8	Maesha Saadi	Comoros	29.60	
58	3	4	Lois Eliora Irishura	Burundi	29.63	
59	3	3	Mayah Chouloute	Haiti	29.78	
60	3	1	Jasmine Schofield	Dominica	29.91	
61	3	2	Kaelyn Ciara Suryanti Djoparto	Suriname	29.99	
62	2	4	Kayla Hepler	Marshall Islands	30.33	
62	3	7	Iman Kouraogo	Burkina Faso	30.33	
64	3	6	Mst Sonia Khatun	Bangladesh	30.52	
64	3	8	Yuri Hosei	Palau	30.52	
66	2	6	Grace Manuela Nguelo'O	Cameroon	30.98	
67	3	5	Isabella Millar	Solomon Islands	31.32	
68	2	5	Lina Alemayehu Selo	Ethiopia	31.87	
69	2	3	Djenabou Jolie Bah	Guinea	31.90	NR
70	2	1	Lidwine Umuhoza Uwase	Rwanda	32.03	
71	2	7	Imelda Ximenes Belo	Timor-Leste	32.48	NR
72	2	2	Adele Sodalo Agnes Gaitou	Togo	32.50	
73	1	3	Vanessa Bobimbo	Republic of the Congo	33.01	
74	1	5	Salima Ahmadou Youssoufou	Niger	33.66	
75	1	4	Naima-Zahra Amison	Djibouti	33.69	NR
76	1	6	Tracy Marine Andet	Central African Republic	34.95	
77	1	2	Aichata Diabate	Mali	37.55	
78	1	7	Olamide Sam	Sierra Leone	42.87	
79	1	1	Divine Miansadi Mpolo	Democratic Republic of the Congo	44.10	

== Semifinals ==
Two semifinals took place on 3 August, starting at 20:39. The swimmers with the best eight times in the semifinals advanced to the final. Sjöström qualified for the final with a time of 23.66, which broke the Olympic record by 0.15 seconds. Walsh qualified with the second seed, and Wasick qualified with the third. Australia's two swimmers, Harris and Shayna Jack, qualified, as did China's two swimmers Zhang Yufei and Wu Qingfeng. Klančar qualified in seventh despite being initially seeded 23rd, setting another national record of 24.40 and becoming the first Slovenian Olympic finalist in swimming since Sara Isakovič in 2008.

Results
Rank	Heat	Lane	Swimmer	Nation	Time	Notes
1	2	4	Sarah Sjöström	Sweden	23.66	Q, OR
2	2	5	Gretchen Walsh	United States	24.17	Q
3	1	4	Katarzyna Wasick	Poland	24.23	Q
4	1	3	Zhang Yufei	China	24.24	Q
5	1	5	Shayna Jack	Australia	24.29	Q
6	2	3	Meg Harris	Australia	24.33	Q
7	1	6	Wu Qingfeng	China	24.40	Q
7	1	7	Neža Klančar	Slovenia	24.40	Q, NR
9	2	6	Michelle Coleman	Sweden	24.47	
10	2	8	Anna Hopkin	Great Britain	24.50	
11	1	2	Béryl Gastaldello	France	24.66	
12	1	8	Valerie van Roon	Netherlands	24.67	
13	2	2	Taylor Ruck	Canada	24.72	
14	2	1	Sara Curtis	Italy	24.77	
15	1	1	Florine Gaspard	Belgium	24.82	
16	2	7	Julie Kepp Jensen	Denmark	24.98	

== Final ==
Race animation based on the split data released by the French Swimming Federation (click to view)

External Video
- Women's 50-metre freestyle final – published by the International Olympic Committee via YouTube

The final took place at 18:30 on 4 August. Sjöström had the fastest reaction time of 0.61 seconds but, as she stated after the race, dove too deep and resurfaced at around 12 metres. Walsh had the slowest reaction time of 0.75, but her longer 15-metre underwater meant that she surfaced in first place, 0.12 ahead of Sjöström and 0.30 ahead of Zhang in third.

Walsh held her lead until 25 metres, where she was overtaken by Sjöström, who extended her lead over most of the field until the finish. At 25 metres, Jack had overtaken Zhang, placing her in third position, while Harris had the fastest split over the 15–25-metre segment which elevated her to fourth.

At the 45-metre mark, Sjöström was 0.34 ahead of the field. Harris had further elevated herself to second place and pushed Walsh to third, with Jack having dropped to seventh. Sjöström and Harris finished in first and second with times of 23.71 and 23.97, respectively. Zhang was 0.06 behind Walsh at the 45-metre mark, but she overtook her in the last five metres to take third by 0.01 with a time of 24.20. Klančar set another Slovenian record with 24.35.

Results
Rank	Lane	Swimmer	Nation	Time	Notes
1st place, gold medalist(s)	4	Sarah Sjöström	Sweden	23.71	
2nd place, silver medalist(s)	7	Meg Harris	Australia	23.97	
3rd place, bronze medalist(s)	6	Zhang Yufei	China	24.20	
4	5	Gretchen Walsh	United States	24.21	
5	3	Katarzyna Wasick	Poland	24.33	
6	8	Neža Klančar	Slovenia	24.35	NR
7	1	Wu Qingfeng	China	24.37	
8	2	Shayna Jack	Australia	24.39	

Graph illustrating the race progression, based on split data released by the French Swimming Federation

Statistics
Name	Underwater distance (m)	Underwater speed (m/s)	15 metre split (s)	25 metre split (s)	Time (s)	Stroke rate (strokes/min)
Sarah Sjöström	12.35	3.10	6.00	10.98	23.71	61.8
Meg Harris	11.22	2.99	6.27	11.20	23.97	61.9
Zhang Yufei	13.01	2.93	6.18	11.20	24.20	63.2
Gretchen Walsh	15.47	3.02	5.88	10.98	24.21	53.8
Katarzyna Wasick	9.47	3.21	6.21	11.20	24.33	60.8
Neža Klančar	15.28	2.79	6.25	11.28	24.35	55.6
Wu Qingfeng	10.74	3.07	6.31	11.32	24.37	58.6
Shayna Jack	10.61	3.08	6.19	11.14	24.39	60.4
