= Derrick Tenai =

Solomon Islands archer (born 1968)

Personal information
- Nationality: Solomon Islands
- Born: June 3, 1968 (age 58)

Sport
- Sport: Archery

Derrick Tenai (born 3 June 1968) is an Solomon Islander archer and police superintendent. Tenai was selected to compete for Solomon Islands at the 1988 Summer Olympics in archery despite not seeing a modern bow before landing in Seoul. He placed last in the preliminary ranking round and set an unofficial Olympic record by missing the target 55 times. After his career, he worked as the superintendent of the Rove Correctional Services Facility.

== Biography ==
Derrick Tenai was born on 3 June 1968. By 1988, he worked as a security guard.

Tenai was selected to compete for Solomon Islands at the 1988 Summer Olympics held in Seoul, South Korea, in the men's individual event. This made him the first Solomon Islander to compete in archery at the Olympic Games. Before arriving to Seoul for his entered event, he had never seen a modern bow. He competed in the preliminary ranking round of the event on 27 September 1988 against 83 other archers, with only the top 24 advancing to the first round. There, he garnered 505 points and placed last out of all of the competitors, hitting only 92 targets. He set an unofficial Olympic record by missing the target 55 times, wherein the rest of the contestants had not missed the target more than five times. As of the 2024 Summer Olympics, Tenai's participation remains as the Solomon Islands sole entry for archery at the Summer Olympics.

As of 2 November 2026, based on his World Archery profile, his Olympic Games participation remains as his only participation in an international archery competition. After his archery career, he became the superintendent of the Correctional Services Facility in Rove, Honiara.
