= Isabella Millar =

Solomon Islands swimmer (born 2007)

Personal information
- Nationality: Solomon Islands
- Born: 2007 (age 18–19)

Sport
- Sport: Swimming
- Event: Women's 50m Freestyle

Isabella Millar (born 2007) is a Soloman Islands swimmer. She represented the Solomon Islands at the 2024 Summer Olympics and carried the nation's flag at the opening ceremony when she was 16 years old.

Millar began swimming when she was three years old because she loved being in the water.

The Solomon Islands was eligible for a universality slot to send a swimmer to the 2024 Summer Olympics. The nation selected Isabella Millar, who would compete in the women's 50 metre freestyle and be the first female swimmer to compete for Solomon Islands at an Olympic Games.

Based in New South Wales, Australia, Millar trained in a pool near her school. She was coached by Stance Sanga. Millar revealed that her main goal for the games was to beat her personal best of 30.04 seconds set at the 2023 Pacific Games. Making her Olympic debut, Millar competed in her event on 3 August at 11:05 a.m., which was held in the Paris La Défense Arena. She competed in the third of the heats and swam in a time of 31.32 seconds. She placed last out of the eight swimmers in her heat, though she finished with a time not fast enough to progress to later rounds, and placed 67th overall. The eventual winner of the event was Sarah Sjöström of Sweden, who swam with a time of 23.71 seconds. After her event, Millar thanked her family, friends and supporters for encouraging her.
