= Surendra Hamal =

Nepalese weightlifter

Personal information
- Nationality: Nepalese
- Born: 1961 or 1962

Sport
- Sport: Weightlifting

Surendra Hamal (born 1961 or 1962) is a Nepalese weightlifter. He competed in the men's lightweight event at the 1984 Summer Olympics. Before becoming a weightlifter, he previously had competed in table tennis and wrestling. He wrote an autobiography which was published in 2016.
