= Wendy Hale =

Solomon Islands weightlifter

Personal information
- Born: November 3, 1987 (age 38)
- Height: 1.62 m (5 ft 4 in)
- Weight: 58 kg (128 lb)

Sport
- Country: Solomon Islands
- Sport: Weightlifting
Medal record
Oceania Weightlifting Championships
Silver medal – second place	2008 Auckland	58 kg

Wendy Hale (born November 3, 1987) is a Solomon Islands weightlifter.

She won a silver medal and a bronze at the Commonwealth Youth Games in 2004, two silver medals at the Mini South Pacific Games in 2005, four gold medals at the Arafura Games in 2007, and two silver medals at the South Pacific Games in 2007.

Hale represented Solomon Islands at the 2008 Summer Olympics in Beijing. She was her country's flagbearer during the opening ceremony. In the Olympic tournament she ranked 12th in the 58 kg category, with a total of 173 kg. In 2016 after the silver medalist Russian Marina Shainova disqualified, she stepped up to the eleventh place.

== Major results ==
Year	Venue	Weight	Snatch (kg)					Clean & Jerk (kg)					Total	Rank
Year	Venue	Weight	1	2	3	Result	Rank	1	2	3	Result	Rank	Total	Rank
Representing Solomon Islands
Olympic Games
2008	Beijing, China	58 kg	74	78	~~82~~	78	11	95	~~100~~	~~100~~	95	11	173	11
World Championships
2007	Chiang Mai, Thailand	58 kg	74	~~78~~	~~78~~	74	31	~~96~~	96	~~101~~	96	29	170	30
Oceania Championships
2008	Auckland, New Zealand	58 kg	65	70	75	75	2nd place, silver medalist(s)	80	90	~~95~~	90	2nd place, silver medalist(s)	165	2nd place, silver medalist(s)
Commonwealth Games
2006	Melbourne, Australia	53 kg	~~60~~	60	62	62	5	75	80	~~84~~	80	5	142	5
Pacific Games
2007	Apia, Samoa	58 kg	—N/a	—N/a	—N/a	79	2nd place, silver medalist(s)	—N/a	—N/a	—N/a	95	2nd place, silver medalist(s)	174	2nd place, silver medalist(s)

Olympic Games
Preceded by Francis Manioru	Flagbearer for Solomon Islands; Beijing 2008	Succeeded by Jenly Tegu Wini
