= Ma Jianping =

Chinese weightlifter

Personal information
- Nationality: Chinese
- Born: 15 March 1961 (age 64)

Sport
- Sport: Weightlifting

Ma Jianping (born 15 March 1961) is a Chinese weightlifter and weightlifting coach. He competed in the men's lightweight event at the 1984 Summer Olympics.
