= Benjamin Fafale =

Solomon Islands weightlifter

Personal information
- Nationality: Solomon Islands
- Born: September 14, 1968 (age 56); Solomon Islands
- Weight: 69 kg (152 lb)

Sport
- Sport: Weightlifting

Benjamin Fafale (born 14 September 1968) is a retired weightlifter who represented the Solomon Islands at the Summer Olympics.

Fafale competed at the 1988 Summer Olympics held in Seoul. There, at the age of 20, he finished 22nd. He was the youngest competitor for the Solomon Islands.
