= Selwyn Kole =

Solomon Island athlete

Personal information
- Full name: Selwyn Kole
- Nationality: Solomon Islands
- Born: December 26, 1973 (age 52) Guadalcanal

Sport
- Sport: Athletics
- Event: 1500 metres

Selwyn Kole Mawetaral (born 26 December 1973) is a retired middle distance athlete from the Solomon Islands.

Kole represented the Solomon Islands team that compete at the 1996 Summer Olympics which was held in Atlanta. He entered the 1500 metres, he finished 12th in his heat so didn't advance to the next round. In 1995 he competed at the 1995 World Championships in Athletics held in Gothenburg, he finished last in his heat.
