= Solomon Islands at the 1983 World Championships in Athletics =

- Flag of the Solomon Islands
- WA code: SOL

in Helsinki, Finland August 7–14, 1983
- Competitors: 2 (1 man and 1 woman) in 4 events
- Medals: Gold 0 Silver 0 Bronze 0 Total 0

World Championships in Athletics appearances
- 1983; 1987–1993; 1995; 1997; 1999; 2001; 2003; 2005; 2007; 2009; 2011; 2013; 2015; 2017; 2019; 2022; 2023

The Solomon Islands competed at the 1983 World Championships in Athletics in Helsinki, Finland, from August 7 to 14, 1983.

== Men ==
Track and road events

Athlete	Event	Heat		Semifinal		Final	
Athlete	Event	Result	Rank	Result	Rank	Result	Rank
Charlie Oliver	800 metres	Did not start		Did not advance			
Charlie Oliver	1500 metres	4:18.24	51	Did not advance			

== Women ==
Track and road events

Athlete	Event	Heat		Quarterfinals		Semifinal		Final	
Athlete	Event	Result	Rank	Result	Rank	Result	Rank	Result	Rank
Florence Gaza	200 metres	30.43	43	Did not advance					
Florence Gaza	400 metres	DNS		Did not advance					
