= Nester Geniwala'a =

Solomon Island sprinter

Personal information
- Nationality: Solomon Islands
- Born: 22 March 1977 (age 49)

Sport
- Sport: Women's athletics

Nester Geniwala'a (born 22 March 1977) is a sprinter from the Solomon Islands.

Geniwala'a was the first female to represent the Solomon Islands at the Olympics when she competed at the 1996 Summer Olympics which was held in Atlanta. She entered the 100 metres she finished 8th in her heat in a time of 13.74 seconds, so didn't advance to the next round.
