= Tony Analau =

Solomon Islands weightlifter

Personal information
- Nationality: Solomon Islands
- Born: May 16, 1969 (age 55); Solomon Islands
- Weight: 62 kg (137 lb)

Sport
- Sport: Weightlifting

Tony Analau (born 16 May 1969) is a retired weightlifter who represented the Solomon Islands.

Analau competed in the weightlifting at the 1996 Summer Olympics which were held in Atlanta, he entered the 64 kg division, but was unable to lift his starting weight of 80 kg, so he didn't finish the event.
