= Johnson Kere =

Personal information
- Full name: Johnson Kere
- Nationality: Solomon Islands

Sport
- Sport: Athletics
- Event: 100 metres

Achievements and titles
- Personal best: 10.96
- Updated on 17 May 2015

Johnson Kere is a sprinter from the Solomon Islands.

Kere was a member of the first ever team that the Solomon Islands sent to the Olympics when they competed at the 1984 Summer Olympics which were held in Los Angeles. He competed in the 100 metres and finished 7th in his heat, so failed to advance to the next round.
