= Solomon Islands at the 2011 World Championships in Athletics =

- WA code: SOL
- National federation: Athletic Solomons
- Website: www.sportingpulse.com/assoc_page.cgi?c=2-1150-0-0-0

in Daegu
- Competitors: 2
- Medals: Gold 0 Silver 0 Bronze 0 Total 0

World Championships in Athletics appearances
- 1983; 1987–1993; 1995; 1997; 1999; 2001; 2003; 2005; 2007; 2009; 2011; 2013; 2015; 2017; 2019; 2022; 2023

The Solomon Islands competed at the 2011 World Championships in Athletics from August 27 to September 4, 2011 in Daegu, South Korea. A team of 2 athletes was announced to represent the country in the event.

== Results ==
=== Men ===
Athlete	Event	Preliminaries		Heats		Semifinals		Final	
Athlete	Event	Time Width Height	Rank	Time Width Height	Rank	Time Width Height	Rank	Time Width Height	Rank
Francis Manioru	100 metres	11.28 (SB)	15	Did not advance					

=== Women ===
Athlete	Event	Preliminaries		Heats		Semifinals		Final	
Athlete	Event	Time Width Height	Rank	Time Width Height	Rank	Time Width Height	Rank	Time Width Height	Rank
Joycelyn Taurukeni	100 metres	13.16 (PB)	24	Did not advance					
