= Pietro Pujia =

Italian weightlifter

Personal information
- Nationality: Italian
- Born: 29 June 1965 (age 59); Savona, Italy

Sport
- Sport: Weightlifting

Pietro Pujia (born 29 June 1965) is an Italian former weightlifter. He competed at the 1984 Summer Olympics and the 1988 Summer Olympics.
