= Jenny Keni =

Solomon Islands sprinter

Personal information
- Nationality: Solomon Islands
- Born: October 11, 1982 (age 43) Ato'ifi, Malaita, Solomon Islands
- Height: 1.72 m (5 ft 7 1/2 in)
- Weight: 64 kg (141 lb)

Sport
- Sport: Women's athletics
Medal record
Women's athletics
Representing Solomon Islands
Oceania Youth Championships
Bronze medal – third place	1999 Santa Rita	200 m
- Updated on 16 April 2013

Jenny Keni (born October 11, 1982) is a sprinter from the Solomon Islands.

Keni has represented her country at the 2000 Summer Olympics in Sydney and the 2004 Summer Olympics in Athens, as well as the 2002 Commonwealth Games. She also took part in the 2003 and 2007 World Athletics Championships, setting a national record in the former with a time of 12.64 seconds in the 100 metre sprint.

In the Solomon Islands Games in 2006, Keni won silver in the 100m sprint, and bronze in the 200m sprint.

== Achievements ==
Year	Competition	Venue	Position	Event	Notes
Representing Solomon Islands
1999	Oceania Youth Championships	Santa Rita, Guam	3rd	200 m	27.97 (wind: 0.0 m/s)
