= Leslie Ata =

Solomon Islands weightlifter

Personal information
- Nationality: Solomon Islands
- Born: October 14, 1963 (age 61); Solomon Islands
- Weight: 66 kg (146 lb)

Sport
- Sport: Weightlifting

Leslie Ata (born 14 October 1963) is a retired weightlifter who represented Solomon Islands.

Ata competed in two Olympics, the first was at the 1984 Summer Olympics held in Los Angeles, where he finished 16th, and then again at the 1992 Summer Olympics in Barcelona, where he was the only competitor for Solomon Islands and he finished 29th.

After retiring he became a weightlifting coach, and won the Solomon Islands Coach of the Year in 2010. He is now the President of the Solomon Islands Weightlifting Federation.

== Major results ==
Year	Venue	Weight	Snatch (kg)					Clean & Jerk (kg)					Total	Rank
Year	Venue	Weight	1	2	3	Result	Rank	1	2	3	Result	Rank	Total	Rank
Representing Solomon Islands
Olympic Games
1992	Barcelona, Spain	75 kg	~~105.0~~	~~105.0~~	105.0	105.0	30	~~130.0~~	130.0	~~135.0~~	130.0	29	235.0	29
1984	Los Angeles, United States	67.5 kg	75.0	80.0	~~82.5~~	80.0	16	100.0	105.0	107.5	107.5	18	187.5	16
World Championships
1984	Los Angeles, United States	75 kg	75.0	80.0	~~82.5~~	80.0	16	100.0	105.0	107.5	107.5	18	187.5	16
Commonwealth Games
1990	Auckland, New Zealand	67.5 kg	—	—	—	95.0	13	—	—	—	117.5	12	212.5	13

Olympic Games
Preceded by Gustave Mansad	Flagbearer for Solomon Islands; Barcelona 1992	Succeeded by Joseph Onika
