= Pauline Kwalea =

Solomon Islands sprinter

Personal information
- Born: February 29, 1988 (age 38) Honiara, Solomon Islands

Sport
- Country: Solomon Islands
- Sport: Athletics
- Event: 100m

Achievements and titles
- Personal best(s): 100m - 12.90s 400m - 1:00.27 min.
Medal record
Women's Athletics
Representing Solomon Islands
Pacific Games
Bronze medal – third place	2007 Apia	4x400 m relay
(South) Pacific Mini Games
Bronze medal – third place	2005 Koror	4x400 m relay
Oceania Championships
Bronze medal – third place	2008 Saipan	800 m medley relay (Mixed)
- Updated on 29 April 2013

Pauline Kwalea (born February 29, 1988) is a track and field sprint athlete who competes internationally for the Solomon Islands.

Kwalea represented the Solomon Islands at the 2008 Summer Olympics in Beijing. She competed at the 100 metres sprint and placed 9th in her heat without advancing to the second round. She ran the distance in a time of 13.28 seconds.

At the 2012 Summer Olympics, she set a new personal best time of 12.90 although she did not advance to the quarterfinals in the Women's 100m event.

== Achievements ==
Year	Competition	Venue	Position	Event	Notes
Representing Solomon Islands
2005	South Pacific Mini Games	Koror, Palau	3rd	4 × 400 m relay	4:26.91 min
2007	Pacific Games	Apia, Samoa	3rd	4 × 400 m relay	4:08.03 min
2008	Oceania Championships	Saipan, Northern Mariana Islands	3rd	Mixed 800 m medley relay	1:41.26 min
