= Tommy Bauro =

Solomon Islander boxer

Tommy Bauro (born 15 August 1965) is a former boxer who competed for the Solomon Islands.

Bauro competed in the 1988 Summer Olympics entering the light-heavyweight, he was knocked out after 2 minutes and 20 seconds by Tongan, Sione Vaveni Taliaʻuli.

Bauro was the flag bearer for the Solomon Islands in the opening ceremony of the 1984 Summer Olympics.
