= Primo Higa =

Personal information
- Full name: Primo Higa
- Nationality: Solomon Islands
- Born: March 11, 1973 (age 53) Makira

Sport
- Sport: Athletics
- Event: 3000 metres steeplechase
Medal record
Men's athletics
Representing the Solomon Islands
Pacific Games

Primo Higa (born 11 March 1973) is a retired middle distance athlete from Solomon Islands.

Higa represented Solomon Islands in two Olympics, in the 1996 Summer Olympics which was held in Atlanta he didn't finish the 3000 metres steeplechase, then four years later at the 2000 Summer Olympics held in Sydney he finished 13th in his heat in the 3000 metres steeplechase but didn't advance to the final.
