= Athletic Solomons =

Sports governing body in the Solomon Islands

- Sport: Athletics
- Abbreviation: AS
- Founded: 1980
- Affiliation: IAAF
- Affiliation date: 1981
- Regional affiliation: OAA
- Headquarters: Honiara, Guadalcanal
- President: Martin Rara
- Vice president: Casper Pule
- Secretary: Reggie Hou
- Replaced: Solomon Islands Amateur Athletic Union
- (Solomon Islands)

Athletic Solomons (AS), also known as Solomon Islands Athletics Association, is the governing body for the sport of athletics in the Solomon Islands.

== History ==
In the 1960th the existence of an organisation called British Solomon Islands Amateur Athletic Association is documented. Baddeley Devesi, who later served as the first Governor-General of the Solomon Islands after independence, is reported to be elected secretary to this association in 1967.

After independence, Athletic Solomons was founded in 1980 (most probably as Solomon Islands Amateur Athletic Union), and was affiliated to the IAAF in the year 1981.

Former president was ex decathlete James Iroga. Current president is Martin Rara. He was elected in November 2012.

== Affiliations ==
- International Association of Athletics Federations (IAAF)
- Oceania Athletics Association (OAA)

Moreover, it is part of the following national organisations:

- National Olympic Committee of Solomon Islands (NOCSI)

== National records ==
Athletic Solomons maintains the Solomon Islands records in athletics.
