= Edgar Iro =

Solomon Islander swimmer

Personal information
- Full name: Edgar Richardson Iro
- Nationality: Solomon Islands
- Born: 18 November 2000 (age 25)

Sport
- Sport: Swimming

Edgar Richardson Iro (born 18 November 2000) is a Solomon Islander swimmer. He competed in the men's 100 metre freestyle at the 2020 Summer Olympics.

He also competed at the 2019 World Aquatics Championships, the 2021 FINA World Swimming Championships (25 m), the 2022 Commonwealth Games, the 2022 World Aquatics Championships, the 2022 FINA World Swimming Championships (25 m), the 2023 World Aquatics Championships, and the 2024 World Aquatics Championships.
