= National Olympic Committee of Solomon Islands =

National Olympic Committee

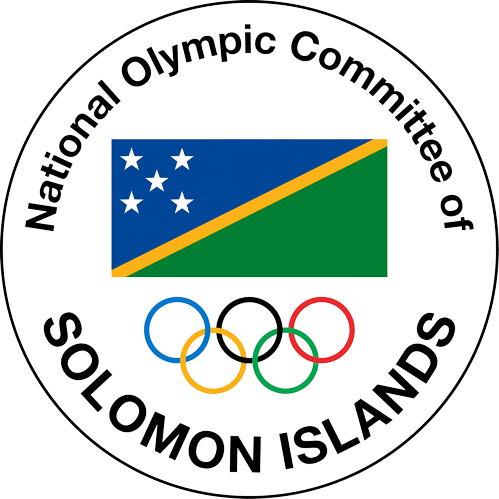
- Country: Solomon Islands
- Code: SOL
- Recognized: 1983
- Continental Association: ONOC
- President: Martin Bai Rara
- Secretary General: Melinda Avosa
- Website: www.nocsi.org.sb

The National Olympic Committee of Solomon Islands (IOC code: SOL) is the National Olympic Committee representing Solomon Islands.

== See also ==
- Solomon Islands at the Olympics
- Solomon Islands at the Commonwealth Games
