= Flag of Solomon Islands =

Solomon Islands
- Flag of Solomon Islands
- Use: National flag
- Proportion: 1:2
- Adopted: 18 November 1977; 49 years ago
- Design: A thin, yellow stripe dividing diagonally from the lower hoist-side corner to the upper fly-side corner: the upper triangle is blue with five white five-pointed stars arranged in an X pattern and the lower triangle is green

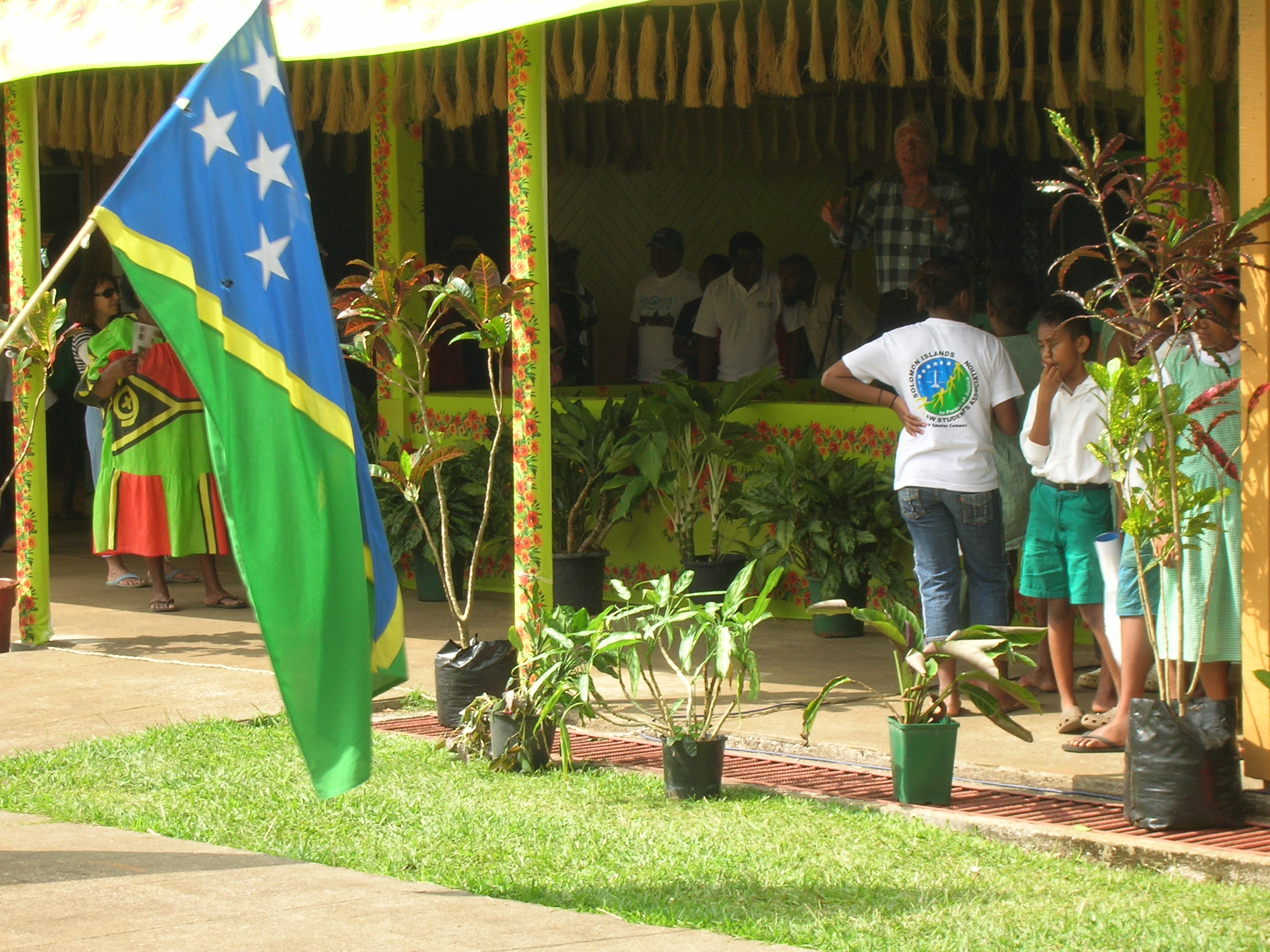
Solomons flag at left

The flag of Solomon Islands consists of a thin yellow diagonal stripe from the lower hoist-side corner, with a blue upper triangle and green lower triangle, and the canton charged with five white stars. Adopted in 1977 to replace the British Blue Ensign defaced with the arms of the protectorate, it has been the flag of Solomon Islands since 18 November of that year, eight months before the country gained independence. Although the number of provinces has since increased, the number of stars on the flag that originally represented them remained unchanged.

== History ==
=== British protectorate ===
The Germans and the British agreed to partition the modern-day Solomon Islands in 1886, with the latter taking control of the southern section. Seven years later, in 1893, they declared this area a protectorate within their colonial empire. At the turn of the 20th century, Germany subsequently gave up their northern part to the United Kingdom in exchange for the latter's acceptance of German claims over Samoa and areas in Africa. During this time, the Union Jack and the Red Ensign were instituted, as well as a Blue Ensign defaced with the protectorate's name and the monarch's crown.

A new emblem for the protectorate was introduced in 1947 and featured a red field charged with a black-and-white sea turtle. This was modified only nine years later because the turtle was a motif affiliated with only one of the islands' provinces. The revised version of 1956 saw the shield divided quarterly and displayed a lion, an eagle, a turtle, a frigate bird, and assorted weapons from the region.

=== New flag for a new country ===
In the lead up to independence, a contest was held in 1975 to design a new flag for the future country. One of the submissions contained the nation's coat of arms, while the initial winning design, by William Robson, an English civil engineer at the Public Works Department, had a blue field with a yellow circle, encompassed with chains and charged with a black frigate bird. However, this was eventually rescinded, since this bird was attributed to only one province as opposed to the entire country. The second winning design included a red field charged with a black elliptical chain at the centre. As explained by the artist, this alluded to the historical practice of blackbirding in the country and the "blood spilt" as a result of it. After it was published in a national newspaper, the design stirred up much debate in the community and it too was scrapped.

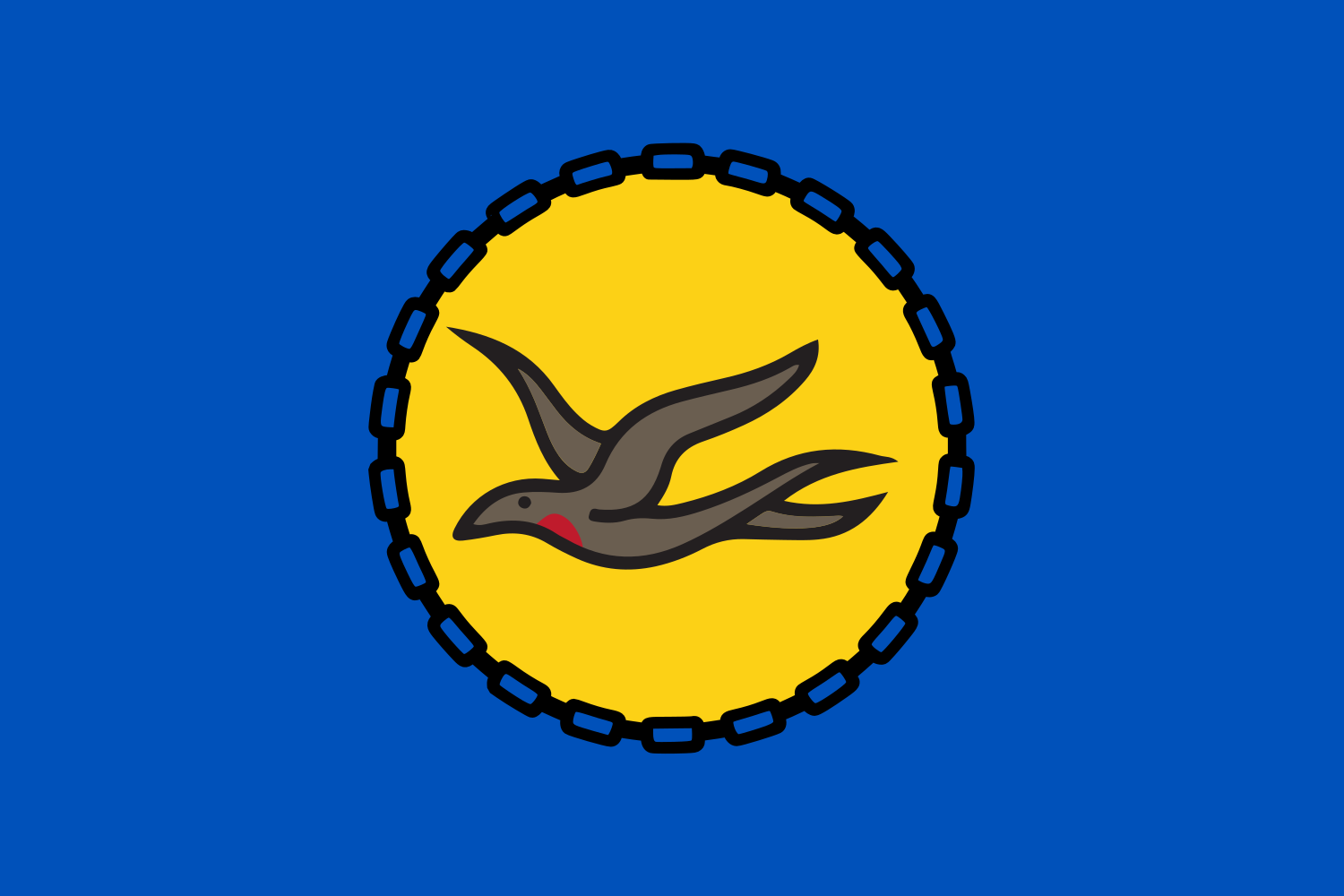
The initial winning design of the 1975 contest.

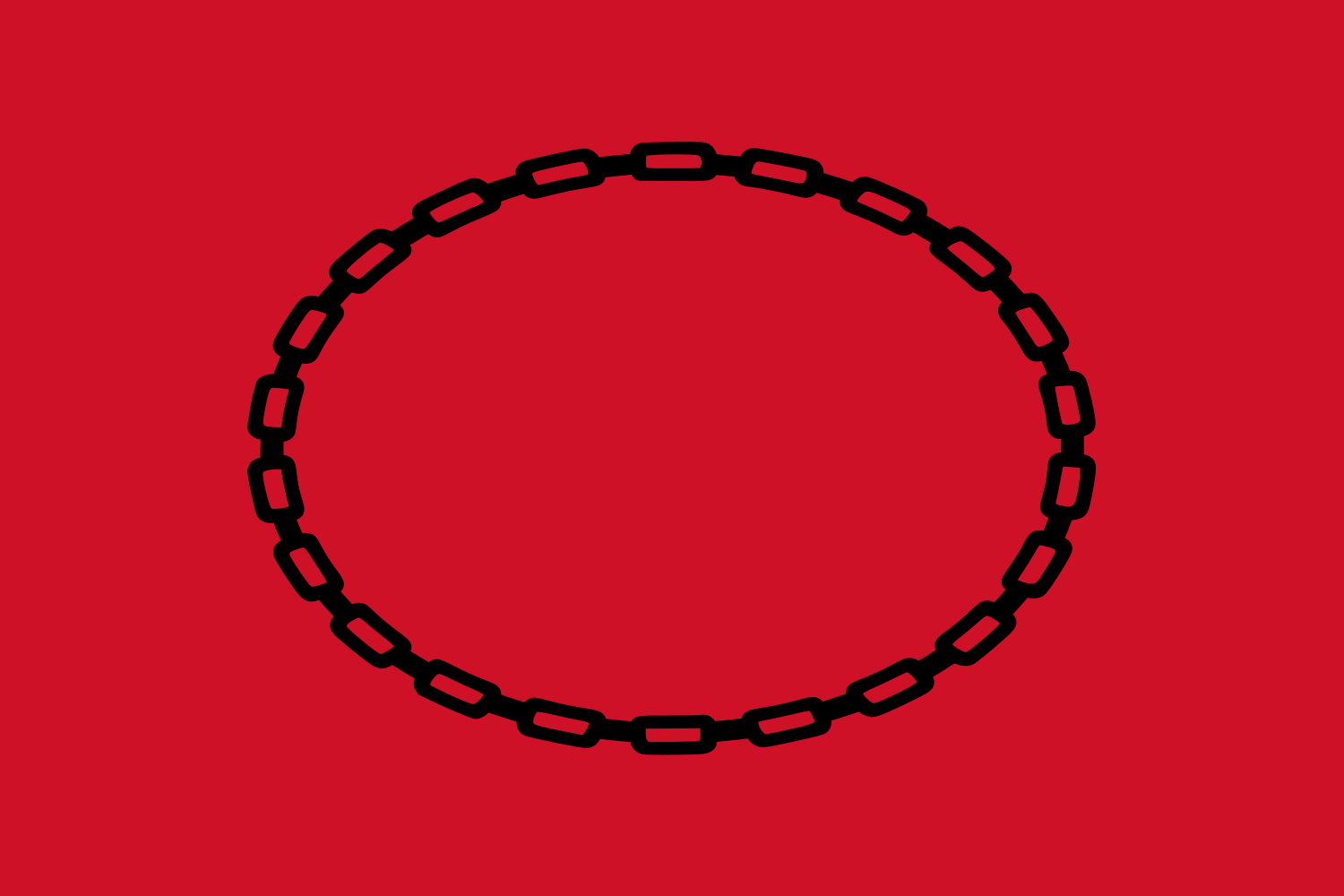
The second winning design of the 1975 contest.

Ultimately, the last design was created by a New Zealander teaching visual arts at the King George VI School, in the eastern part of the capital Honiara. This was in spite of the fact that preference was supposed to be given to local submissions by Solomon Islanders. The stars stood for the country's provinces and not the Southern Cross, unlike the flags of nearby Australia, New Zealand, Papua New Guinea, and Samoa. It was ratified as the new flag of the islands on 18 November 1977, eight months before the country became the final British protectorate to gain independence.

=== Independence and beyond ===
The Independence Day ceremony on 7 July 1978, in Gizo, Western Province – which saw the lowering of the Union Jack and the raising of the new flag – was controversial and led to a confrontation between locals and those from Malaita Province. This was because leaders from the Western Council had unsuccessfully lobbied the government to promise greater devolved powers to the provinces, and some of the province's inhabitants viewed the flag ceremony – which had already been engineered to be as subdued as possible – as a demonstration of "Malaitan dominance" over Western Province.

The Solomon Islander flag has been utilized as a flag of convenience by foreign merchant vessels since 2012. That year, an Act was adopted by the country's National Parliament approving of its usage in this manner, with the government predicting more than US$500,000 in taxes annually. The transport minister claimed that this would also give local sailors new employment opportunities and expand chances to reap foreign exchange.

== Design ==
=== Symbolism ===
The colours and symbols of the flag have cultural, political, and regional meanings. The blue evokes the water, as well as its significance to the country in the form of rivers, rain, and the Pacific Ocean. The green alludes to the land, along with the trees and crops that grow on it. The yellow epitomises the sun and its rays separating the land and the ocean.

The five stars are arranged in three offset rows at the canton, in the shape of the letter X. At first, these were meant to symbolise the provinces that the country was subdivided into at the time of independence (Central, Western, Eastern, Malaita and Honiara Capital). Even though new provinces have since been created, the number of stars has remained unchanged.

=== Similarities ===
The 'Southern Horizon' design, a proposed alternative to the current flag of Australia.

One of the various proposed alternatives to the present flag of Australia is an emblem labelled the 'Southern Horizon'. Having been voted as the favourite in an unofficial poll of more than 8,000 people, its blue, gold, and green colour scheme – together with its depiction of the Southern Cross – is noted for its conspicuous resemblance to that of the Solomon Islands flag.

== Variants ==
The civil ensign (for merchant ships) and state ensign (for non-military government vessels) are red and blue flags, respectively, with the national flag in the canton. The naval ensign (for police vessels) is based on the British white ensign, a red cross on a white field, also with the national flag in the canton.

Variant flags of Solomon Islands
Variant flag	Usage
	Civil ensign
	State ensign
	Customs Service Ensign
	Naval Ensign

== Historical flags ==
Historical flags of the British Solomon Islands
Historical flag	Duration	Description
	1893– 1906	The Union Jack.
	1906–1947	A Blue Ensign defaced with the name of the protectorate ('British Solomon Islands') and the Tudor Crown.
	1947–1956	A Blue Ensign charged with a shield depicting a black-and-white sea turtle.
	1956–1966	A Blue Ensign charged with a shield divided quarterly – depicting a lion, an eagle, a turtle, weapons from the region, and a frigate bird – on a white disk.
	1966–1977	Identical to the previous version, save for the removal of the white disk.

== Provincial flags of Solomon Islands ==
These are the flags of the nine provinces administered by elected provincial assemblies, the tenth is the capital Honiara, administered by the Honiara Town Council.

Flag	Province
	Central
	Choiseul
	Guadalcanal
	Isabel
	Makira-Ulawa
	Malaita
	Rennel and Bellona
	Temotu
	Western
	Capital Territory
