= List of flag bearers for Tonga at the Olympics =

Tonga at the Olympics
- IOC code: TGA
- NOC: Tonga Sports Association and National Olympic Committee
- Website: www.oceaniasport.com/tonga
- Medals: Gold 0 Silver 1 Bronze 0 Total 1

Summer appearances
- 1984; 1988; 1992; 1996; 2000; 2004; 2008; 2012; 2016; 2020; 2024

Winter appearances
- 2014; 2018; 2022–2026

This is a list of flag bearers who have represented Tonga at the Olympics.

Flag bearers carry the national flag of their country at the opening ceremony of the Olympic Games.

#	Event year	Season	Flag bearer(s)	Sport
1	1984	Summer	Fine Sani	Boxing
2	1988	Summer	Siololovau Ikavuka	Athletics
3	1992	Summer		
4	1996	Summer	Paea Wolfgramm	Boxing
5	2000	Summer	Ana Siulolo Liku	Athletics
6	2004	Summer	Ma'afu Hawke	Boxing
7	2008	Summer	Ana Po'uhila	Athletics
8	2012	Summer	Amini Fonua	Swimming
9	2014	Winter	Bruno Banani	Luge
10	2016	Summer	Pita Taufatofua	Taekwondo
11	2018	Winter	Pita Taufatofua	Cross-country skiing
12	2020	Summer	Malia Paseka	Taekwondo
12	2020	Summer	Pita Taufatofua	Taekwondo
13	2024	Summer	Noelani Day	Swimming
13	2024	Summer	Maleselo Fukofuka	Athletics

== See also ==
- Tonga at the Olympics
