= Tonga at the World Athletics Championships =

- WA code: TON
- National federation: Tonga Athletics Association
- Website: athletics-oceania.com/tonga/
- Medals: Gold 0 Silver 0 Bronze 0 Total 0

World Athletics Championships appearances (overview)
- 1983; 1987; 1991; 1993; 1995; 1997; 1999; 2001; 2003; 2005; 2007; 2009; 2011; 2013; 2015; 2017; 2019; 2022; 2023; 2025

Tonga has competed in the World Athletics Championships six times with their first appearance being in 1983 at Helsinki, Finland with Georges Taniel competing in the men's 100m. As of 2019, the country has not recorded any medals. Tonga best performance was in 1983 when Niulolo Pelesikoti placed eighteenth in the Men's decathlon.

== Entrants ==
| Athlete | Event | Championships |
|---|---|---|
| Niulolo Pelesikoti | Men's decathlon | 1983 |
| Homelo Vi | Men's decathlon | 1991 |
| Lusia Puleanga | Women's 100 metres | 1991, 1993 |
| Lusia Puleanga | Women's 200 metres | 1993 |
| Toluta'u Koula | Men's 100 metres | 1995, 1997 |
| Siulolo Liku | Women's long jump | 1995, 1997 |
| Siulolo Liku | Women's 100 metres | 1999 |
| Sesi Salt | Men's 100 metres | 2001 |
| Ana Pouhila | Women's 100 metres | 2001 |
| Ana Pouhila | Women's shot put | 2003, 2005, 2007, 2009 |
| Aisea Tohi | Men's 100 metres | 2007, 2009 |
| Joseph Andy Lui | Men's 100 metres | 2011 |
| Belinda Talakai | Women's 100 metres | 2011 |
| Siueni Filimone | Men's 100 metres | 2013 |
| La Shondra David Mosa'ati | Men's 100 metres | 2015 |
| Ronald Lawrence Fotofili | Men's 100 metres | 2019 |
