= Boxing at the 1984 Summer Olympics – Welterweight =

Olympic boxing tournament

Welterweight boxing at the Games of the XXIII Olympiad
- Venue: Los Angeles Memorial Sports Arena
- Dates: 29 July – 11 August 1984
- Competitors: 36 from 36 nations

Medalists
1st place, gold medalist(s)		Mark Breland	United States
2nd place, silver medalist(s)		An Young-su	South Korea
3rd place, bronze medalist(s)		Joni Nyman	Finland
3rd place, bronze medalist(s)		Luciano Bruno	Italy

The men's welterweight event was part of the boxing programme at the 1984 Summer Olympics. The weight class allowed boxers of up to 67 kilograms to compete. The competition was held from 29 July to 11 August 1984. 36 boxers from 36 nations competed.

== Medalists ==
Gold	Mark Breland; United States
Silver	An Young-su; South Korea
Bronze	Joni Nyman; Finland
Bronze	Luciano Bruno; Italy

== Results ==
The following boxers took part in the event:

Rank	Name	Country
1	Mark Breland	United States
2	An Young-su	South Korea
3T	Joni Nyman	Finland
3T	Luciano Bruno	Italy
5T	Dwight Frazer	Jamaica
5T	Vesa Koskela	Sweden
5T	Alexander Künzler	West Germany
5T	Genaro León	Mexico
9T	Kieran Joyce	Ireland
9T	Kitenge Kitengewa	Zaire
9T	Bernard Wilson	Grenada
9T	Vedat Önsoy	Turkey
9T	Kamel Aboud	Algeria
9T	Peter Okumu	Uganda
9T	Khemais Refai	Tunisia
9T	Rudel Obreja	Romania
17T	Georges-Claude Ngangue	Cameroon
17T	Basil Boniface	Seychelles
17T	Lefa Tsapi	Lesotho
17T	Francisco Lisboa	Indonesia
17T	Roland Omoruyi	Nigeria
17T	Abrar Hussain Syed	Pakistan
17T	Saikoloni Hala	Tonga
17T	Henry Kalunga	Zambia
17T	Mohamed Ali El-Dahan	Syria
17T	Neva Mkadala	Tanzania
17T	Georges Boco	Benin
17T	Konrad König	Austria
17T	Akinobu Hiranaka	Japan
17T	Carlos Reyes	Puerto Rico
17T	Mickey Hughes	Great Britain
32T	Daniel Domínguez	Argentina
32T	Wayne Gordon	Canada
32T	Abock Shoak	Sudan
32T	Antoine Longoudé	Central African Republic
32T	Paul Rasamimanana	Madagascar

=== First round ===
- Genaro Léon (MEX) def. Daniel Dominguez (ARG), 5:0
- Mark Breland (USA) def. Wayne Gordon (CAN), 5:0
- An Young-Su (KOR) def. Abock Shoah (SUD), 5:0
- Rudel Obreja (ROU) def. Antoine Longoudé (RCA), KO-1
- Michael Hughes (GBR) def. Paul Rasamimanana (MDG), 5:0

=== Second round ===
- Joni Nyman (FIN) def. Georges-Claude Ngangue (CMR), 5:0
- Kieran Joyce (IRL) def. Basil Boniface (SEY), RSC-2
- Kitenge Kitangawa (ZAI) def. Lefa Tsapi (LES), RSC-1
- Dwight Frazier (JAM) def. Francisco Lisboa (INA), 5:0
- Bernard Wilson (GRN) def. Roland Omoruyi (NGR), RSC-3
- Vesa Koskela (SWE) def. Abrar Hussain Syed (PAK), 4:1
- Vedat Önsöy (TUR) def. Saikoloni Hala (TNG), 5:0
- Kamel Abboud (ALG) def. Henry Kalunga (ZAM), 5:0
- Alexander Künzler (FRG) def. Mohamed Ali Aldahan (SYR), 5:0
- Peter Okumu (UGA) def. Neya Mkadala (TNZ), 3:2
- Luciano Bruno (ITA) def. Georges Boco (BEN), 5:0
- Khemais Refai (TUN) def. Konrad König (AUT), RSC-1
- Genaro Léon (MEX) def. Akinobu Hiranaka (JPN), 5:0
- Mark Breland (USA) def. Carlos Reyes (PUR), RSC-3
- Rudel Obreja (ROU) def. Michael Hughes (GBR), 5:0

=== Third round ===
- Joni Nyman (FIN) def. Kieran Joyce (IRL), 4:1
- Dwight Frazier (JAM) def. Kitenge Kitangawa (ZAI), 3:2
- Vesa Koskela (SWE) def. Bernard Wilson (GRN), KO-3
- An Young-Su (KOR) def. Vedat Önsöy (TUR), 5:0
- Alexander Küzler (FRG) def. Kamel Abboud (ALG), 4:1
- Luciano Bruno (ITA) def. Peter Okumu (UGA), 4:1
- Genaro Léon (MEX) def. Khemais Refai (TUN), 3:2
- Mark Breland (USA) def. Rudel Obreja (ROU), 5:0

=== Quarterfinals ===
- Joni Nyman (FIN) def. Dwight Frazier (JAM), 5:0
- An Young-Su (KOR) def. Vesa Koskela (SWE), 5:0
- Luciano Bruno (ITA) def. Alexander Künzler (FRG), 5:0
- Mark Breland (USA) def. Genaro Léon (MEX), KO-1

=== Semifinals ===
- An Young-Su (KOR) def. Joni Nyman (FIN), 3:2
- Mark Breland (USA) def. Luciano Bruno (ITA), 5:0

=== Final ===
- Mark Breland (USA) def. An Young-Su (KOR), 5:0
