= Tonga at the 2008 Summer Olympics =

- IOC code: TGA
- NOC: Tonga Sports Association and National Olympic Committee
- Website: www.oceaniasport.com/tonga

in Beijing
- Competitors: 3 in 2 sports
- Flag bearer: Ana Po'uhila
- Medals: Gold 0 Silver 0 Bronze 0 Total 0

Summer Olympics appearances (overview)
- 1984; 1988; 1992; 1996; 2000; 2004; 2008; 2012; 2016; 2020; 2024; 2028

Tonga competed at the 2008 Summer Olympics, that celebrated in Beijing, China, from August 8 to August 24, 2008. Tonga was represented by the Tonga Sports Association and National Olympic Committee, and was one of 117 nations that won no medals at the Games. Tonga was represented by three athletes competing in two sports–Aisea Tohi and Ana Po'uhila in track and field events, and Maamaloa Lolohea in weightlifting. The delegation's appearance at the Olympics marked its seventh consecutive appearance at the Olympics since its debut at the 1984 Summer Olympics in Los Angeles. The flag bearer for Tonga in Beijing was field athlete Ana Po'uhila.

== Background ==
The Kingdom of Tonga is an archipelago of 169 islands (36 are inhabited by about 100,000 people) that is located in the South Pacific Ocean to the far east of Australia. Initially known as the "Friendly Islands" by explorers, The islands of Tonga united under a single monarchy in 1845, and devised a constitution to restrain the monarchy in 1875. It is the only nation in the South Pacific that has neither been formally colonized nor had its original government dissolved, although it became a protectorate of the United Kingdom on 1900. Tonga renounced British protection in 1970 and, as of 2012, was the only monarchy in the Pacific Ocean.

Some 14 years after becoming a sovereign nation in both foreign and domestic affairs, Tonga submitted its first delegation to the 1984 Summer Olympics in Los Angeles, California, its largest Olympic team ever as of the Beijing Olympics. The first female Tongan athlete participated in the Olympics at the 1988 Summer Olympics in Seoul, South Korea. Between 1984 and 2008, Tongan athletes have participated at all of the seven summer Olympics. From 1988 to 2008, however, there had not been a Tongan Olympic team greater than five athletes in size. There had been a single Tongan medalist during this time period: Paea Wolfgramm won a silver medal in boxing at the 1996 Summer Olympics in Atlanta, Georgia.

Three athletes went to the 2008 Beijing Summer Games to participate on Tonga's behalf. Aisea Tohi was its sole track athlete, Ana Po'uhila was its sole field and only female athlete, and Maamaloa Lolohea was its only weightlifter. At 21 years old, Tohi was the youngest member of the delegation; Lolohea, at 40, was the oldest. Po'uhila was the nation's flag bearer at the ceremonies.

== Athletics ==
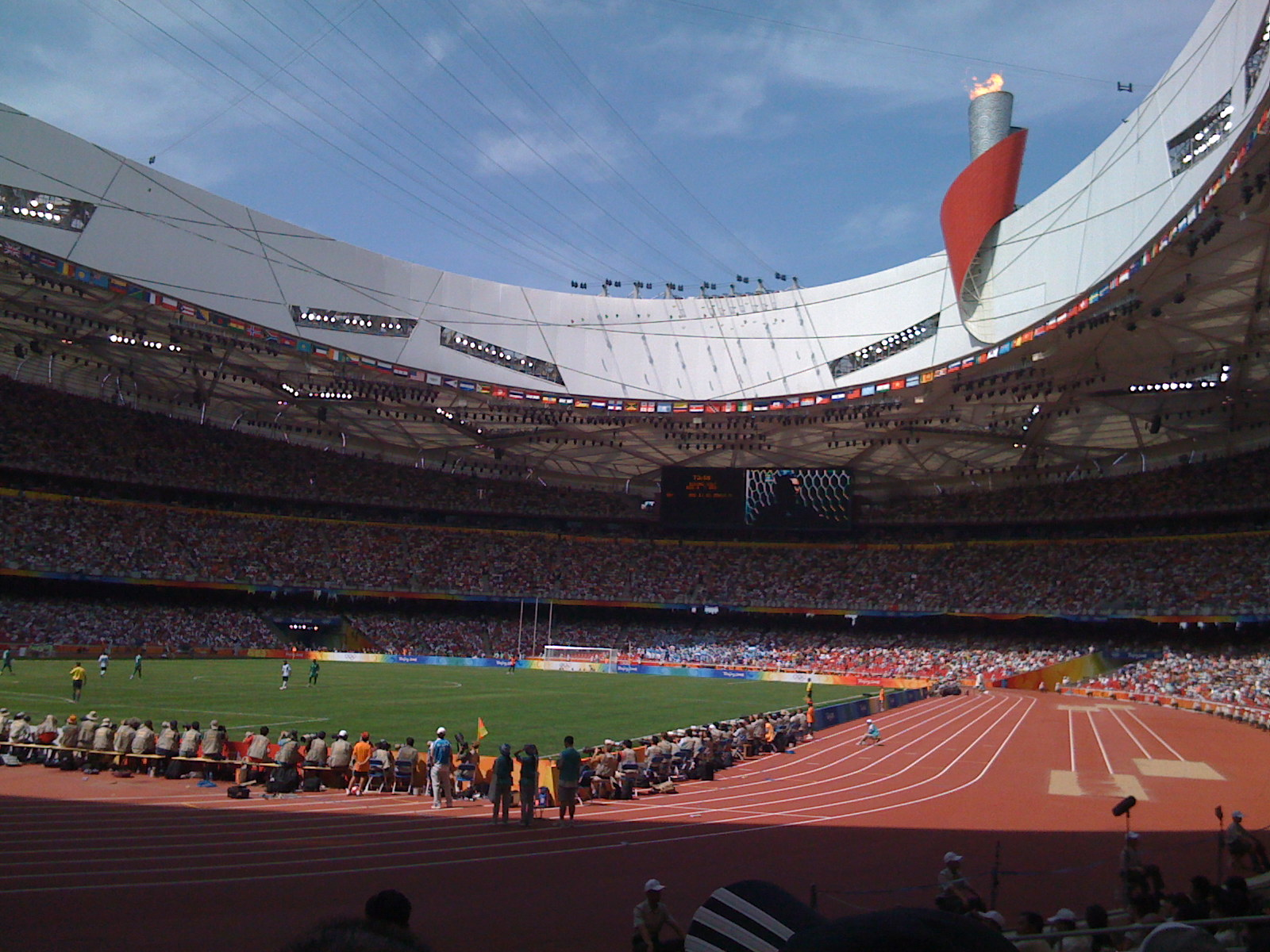
The Beijing National Stadium, where Po'uhila and Tohi competed in their events

Aisea Tohi represented Tonga at the Beijing Olympics in track and field. Born on Tonga's main island of Tongatapu in the settlement of Tofua, attended the Beijing Olympics at 21 years old, participating in the men's 100 meters dash. Tohi had not previously competed in any Olympic games. During the course of his event's qualification round, which took place on August 14, Tohi was placed in the second heat against seven other athletes. He finished the race in 11.17 seconds, placing seventh in his heat ahead of Roman William Cress from the Marshall Islands (11.18 seconds) and behind Béranger Bosse of the Central African Republic (10.51 seconds). The leaders of Tohi's heat included Jamaica's Asafa Powell (10.16 seconds) as well as Kim Collins of Saint Kitts and Nevis (10.17 seconds). Of the 80 athletes participating in the qualification round, Tohi placed 71st. He did not advance to later rounds.

Ana Po'uhila participated in the women's shot put on the behalf of Tonga at the Beijing Olympics, and was the only female athlete competing for Tonga at the 2008 Olympic games. She was born in Nuku'alofa, the national capital, which lies on the primary Tongan island of Tongatapu. Po'uhila first participated in the Olympics at age 24, when she represented Tonga in shot put at the 2004 Athens games. She represented Tonga again in Beijing at the age of 32. During the qualifying heat of her event, which took place on August 15, the Tongan field athlete was placed in the seventeen-person second heat. Po'uhila was given three attempts to put the shot as far as she could. During the first attempt, she lobbed the shot 16.21 meters, ranking 12th in her heat. She bested this ranking on her second attempt when she lobbed it 16.42 meters, ranking seventh amongst those who threw during the second try. Her third and final attempt, 16.35 meters, did not beat her second attempt. Using her best mark, 16.42 meters, Po'uhila placed 12th out of the 16 athletes who finished the event. She ranked ahead of Taiwan's Lin Chia-Ying (16.32 meters) and behind Russia's Irina Khudoroshkina (16.84 meters) in a heat led by China's Gong Lijiao (19.46 meters) and Belarus' Nadzeya Ostapchuk (19.08 meters). Of the 33 athletes who finished the event, Ana Po'uhila ranked 27th. She did not advance to the final round.

Men

Athlete	Event	Heat		Quarterfinal		Semifinal		Final	
Athlete	Event	Result	Rank	Result	Rank	Result	Rank	Result	Rank
Aisea Tohi	100 m	11.17	7	Did not advance					

Women

Athlete	Event	Qualification		Final	
Athlete	Event	Distance	Position	Distance	Position
Ana Po'uhila	Shot put	16.42	27	Did not advance	

Key

- Note–Ranks given for track events are within the athlete's heat only
- Q = Qualified for the next round
- q = Qualified for the next round as a fastest loser or, in field events, by position without achieving the qualifying target
- NR = National record
- N/A = Round not applicable for the event
- Bye = Athlete not required to compete in round

== Weightlifting ==
Maamaloa Lolohea participated in the Beijing Olympics on Tonga's behalf, competing in weightlifting. Lolohea was born in Kolofo'ou, a district of the capital city Nuku'alofa, and competed in Beijing as a 40-year-old in the men's super-heavyweight class division, which encompasses athletes who weigh more than 105 kilograms. Lolohea had not previously competed at any Olympic games. The Tongan athlete competed in his event on August 19, where he faced 14 other athletes. During the snatch phase of the event, Lolohea was given three attempts. He successfully lifted 127 kilograms on his first attempt, 135 kilograms on his second attempt, and 140 kilograms on his third and final attempt. During the clean and jerk phase of the event, he successfully lifted 173 kilograms on his first try, but unsuccessfully attempted to lift 185 kilograms on his second and third attempts. Because his highest scores were 140 in snatch and 173 in clean and jerk, Lolohea's final and total score was 313 kilograms. Of the 13 competitors who finished the event, Maamaloa Lolohea finished last behind Sam Pera, Jr. of the Cook Islands (350 kilograms), who in turn finished behind Finland's Antti Everi (366 kilograms). Gold medalist Matthias Steiner of Germany, in contrast, lifted a total of 461 kilograms.

Athlete	Event	Snatch		Clean & Jerk		Total	Rank
Athlete	Event	Result	Rank	Result	Rank	Total	Rank
Maamaloa Lolohea	Men's +105 kg	140	13	173	13	313	13

== See also ==
- Tonga at the 2008 Summer Paralympics
