= Tonga at the 1996 Summer Olympics =

- IOC code: TGA
- NOC: Tonga Sports Association and National Olympic Committee
- Website: www.oceaniasport.com/tonga

in Atlanta
- Competitors: 5 (4 men and 1 woman) in 3 sports
- Flag bearer: Paea Wolfgramm
- Medals Ranked 61st: Gold 0 Silver 1 Bronze 0 Total 1

Summer Olympics appearances (overview)
- 1984; 1988; 1992; 1996; 2000; 2004; 2008; 2012; 2016; 2020; 2024

Tonga competed at the 1996 Summer Olympics in Atlanta, United States. The nation won its first ever Olympic medal at these Games.

== Medalists ==
| Medal | Name | Sport | Event | Date |
|---|---|---|---|---|
| Silver | Paea Wolfgramm | Boxing | Super heavyweight | August 4 |

== Athletics ==
Men
Track & road events

| Athlete | Event | Heat | | Quarterfinal | | Semifinal | | Final | |
| Athlete | Event | Result | Rank | Result | Rank | Result | Rank | Result | Rank |
|---|---|---|---|---|---|---|---|---|---|
| Toluta'u Koula | 100 m | 10.71 | 8 | Did not advance | | | | | |

Women
Field events

| Athlete | Event | Qualification | | Final | |
| Athlete | Event | Distance | Position | Distance | Position |
|---|---|---|---|---|---|
| Ana Liku | Long jump | 6.06 | 28 | Did not advance | |

== Boxing ==
=== Men ===
| Athlete | Event | Round of 32 | Round of 16 | Quarterfinals | Semifinals | Final | |
| Athlete | Event | Opposition Result | Opposition Result | Opposition Result | Opposition Result | Opposition Result | Rank |
|---|---|---|---|---|---|---|---|
| Shane Heaps | Welterweight | Nourbek Kassenov (KGZ); L 2-11 | Did not advance | | | | |
| Paea Wolfgramm | Super heavyweight | BYE | Serguei Diahhovitch (BLR); W 10-9 | Alexis Rubalcaba (CUB); W 17-12 | Duncan Dokiwari (NGR); W 7-6 | Wladimir Klitschko (UKR); L 3-7 | Silver medal |

== Weightlifting ==
=== Men ===
| Athlete | Event | Snatch | | Clean & jerk | | Total | Rank |
| Athlete | Event | Result | Rank | Result | Rank | Total | Rank |
|---|---|---|---|---|---|---|---|
| Viliami Tapaatoutai | 91 kg | 105.0 | 25 | ~~140.0~~ | AC | 105.0 | DNF |
