= Tonga at the 2020 Summer Olympics =

- IOC code: TGA
- NOC: Tonga Sports Association and National Olympic Committee
- Website: www.oceaniasport.com/tonga

in Tokyo, Japan July 23, 2021 – August 8, 2021
- Competitors: 6 in 4 sports
- Flag bearers (opening): Malia Paseka; Pita Taufatofua
- Flag bearer (closing): N/A
- Medals: Gold 0 Silver 0 Bronze 0 Total 0

Summer Olympics appearances (overview)
- 1984; 1988; 1992; 1996; 2000; 2004; 2008; 2012; 2016; 2020; 2024; 2028

Tonga competed at the 2020 Summer Olympics in Tokyo. Originally scheduled to take place from 24 July to 9 August 2020, the Games were postponed to 23 July to 8 August 2021, due to the COVID-19 pandemic. It was the nation's tenth consecutive appearance at the Summer Olympics.

== Competitors ==
The following is the list of number of competitors in the Games.

Sport	Men	Women	Total
Athletics	1	0	1
Swimming	1	1	2
Taekwondo	1	1	2
Weightlifting	0	1	1
Total	3	3	6

== Athletics ==
Tonga received a universality slot from the World Athletics to send a male track and field athlete to the Olympics.

Key

- Note–Ranks given for track events are within the athlete's heat only
- Q = Qualified for the next round
- q = Qualified for the next round as a fastest loser or, in field events, by position without achieving the qualifying target
- NR = National record
- N/A = Round not applicable for the event
- Bye = Athlete not required to compete in round

Track & road events

Athlete	Event	Heat		Semifinal		Final	
Athlete	Event	Result	Rank	Result	Rank	Result	Rank
Ronald Fotofili	Men's 100 m	11.19 SB	8	Did not advance			

== Swimming ==
Tonga received a universality invitation from FINA to send two top-ranked swimmers (one per gender) in their respective individual events to the Olympics, based on the FINA Points System of June 28, 2021.

Athlete	Event	Heat		Semifinal		Final	
Athlete	Event	Time	Rank	Time	Rank	Time	Rank
Amini Fonua	Men's 100 m breaststroke	DSQ		Did not advance			
Noelani Day	Women's 50 m freestyle	29.06	63	Did not advance			

== Taekwondo ==
Tonga entered two athletes into the taekwondo competition at the Games. Rio 2016 Olympian Pita Taufatofua (men's +80 kg) and Malia Paseka (women's 67 kg) secured spots with a victory each in their respective weight classes at the 2020 Oceania Qualification Tournament in Gold Coast, Queensland, Australia.

Athlete	Event	Round of 16	Quarterfinals	Semifinals	Repechage	Final / BM	
Athlete	Event	Opposition Result	Opposition Result	Opposition Result	Opposition Result	Opposition Result	Rank
Pita Taufatofua	Men's +80 kg	Larin (ROC); L 3–24 PTG	Did not advance		Trajkovič (SLO); L 1–22 PTG	Did not advance	7
Malia Paseka	Women's −67 kg	Williams (GBR); L RSC	Did not advance		Malak (EGY); L 0–19	Did not advance	7

== Weightlifting ==
Tonga received one tripartite invitation quota from the International Weightlifting Federation.

Athlete	Event	Snatch		Clean & Jerk		Total	Rank
Athlete	Event	Result	Rank	Result	Rank	Total	Rank
Kuinini Manumua	Women's +87 kg	103	8	125	9	228	8
