= Luciano Bruno =

Italian boxer (born 1963)

Olympic medal record

Men's Boxing

Representing Italy

Summer Olympics
| Bronze medal – third place | 1984 Los Angeles | Welterweight |

European Amateur Championships
| Silver medal – second place | 1983 Varna | Welterweight |

World Cup
| Gold medal – first place | 1983 Rome | Welterweight |

Mediterranean Games
| Silver medal – second place | 1983 Casablanca | Welterweight |

Luciano Bruno (born 23 May 1963 in Foggia) is a retired Italian boxer, who won a Welterweight Bronze medal at the 1984 Summer Olympics.

== Amateur career ==
=== Olympic results ===
- 1/16: 1st round bye
- 1/8: Defeated Georges Bosco (Benin) 5–0
- 1/4: Defeated Peter Okumu (Nigeria) 4–1
- 1/2: Defeated Alexander Künzler (West Germany) 5–0
- Finals: Lost to Mark Breland (United States) 0–5

== Professional career ==
Bruno turned pro in 1984, winning his first nine fights, and retiring unbeaten in 1987 with a career record of 9–0–0.

== Professional boxing record ==
| 9 fights | 9 wins | 0 losses |
|---|---|---|
| By knockout | 6 | 0 |

== Retirement and later years ==
Bruno is now working as a boxing coach in Foggia.
