= An Young-su =

South Korean boxer

Medal record

Men's boxing

Representing South Korea

Olympic Games
Silver medal – second place	1984 Los Angeles	Welterweight

Asian Amateur Championships
Gold medal – first place	1983 Okinawa	Welterweight

- An Young-su
- Hangul: 안영수
- Hanja: 安榮水
- RR: An Yeongsu
- MR: An Yŏngsu

An Young-su (Korean: 안영수; Hanja: 安榮水; born February 20, 1964, in Seoul, South Korea) is a retired amateur boxer from South Korea, who won the silver medal in the men's welterweight division (–67 kg) at the 1984 Summer Olympics in Los Angeles, California. In the final he was beaten by Mark Breland of the United States.

== Results ==
1984 Summer Olympics
Event	Round	Result	Opponent	Score
Welterweight	First	Win	(Sudan) Abock Shoah	5-0
Welterweight	Second	bye		
Welterweight	Third	Win	(Turkey) Vedat Önsöy	5-0
Welterweight	Quarterfinal	Win	(Sweden) Vesa Koskela	5-0
Welterweight	Semifinal	Win	(Finland) Joni Nyman	3-2
Welterweight	Final	Loss	(United States) Mark Breland	0-5
