= Tonga at the 2016 Summer Paralympics =

- IPC code: TGA
- NPC: Tonga National Paralympic Committee

in Rio de Janeiro
- Competitors: 2 in 1 sports
- Medals: Gold 0 Silver 0 Bronze 0 Total 0

Summer Paralympics appearances (overview)
- 2000; 2004; 2008; 2012; 2016; 2020; 2024

Tonga competed at the 2016 Summer Paralympics in Rio de Janeiro, Brazil, from 7 September to 18 September 2016.

== History ==
Tonga went into the Paralympic Games with never having won a Paralympic medal in their history of participating in the Games. At the previous Games in London, the country only sent one sportsperson.

== Disability classifications ==
Every participant at the Paralympics has their disability grouped into one of five disability categories; amputation, the condition may be congenital or sustained through injury or illness; cerebral palsy; wheelchair athletes, there is often overlap between this and other categories; visual impairment, including blindness; Les autres, any physical disability that does not fall strictly under one of the other categories, for example dwarfism or multiple sclerosis. Each Paralympic sport then has its own classifications, dependent upon the specific physical demands of competition. Events are given a code, made of numbers and letters, describing the type of event and classification of the athletes competing. Some sports, such as athletics, divide athletes by both the category and severity of their disabilities, other sports, for example swimming, group competitors from different categories together, the only separation being based on the severity of the disability.

== Athletics ==
=== Men's field ===
These Paralympics were Sione Manu's first. He participated in the Javelin F46 event. Manu had his left arm amputated above the elbow after an accident.

Athlete	Events	Result	Rank
Sione Manu	Javelin F46	35.62	12

=== Women's field ===
Ana Talakai was the opening ceremonies flag bearer for Tonga. Sione Manu was her sighted guide for the opening ceremony.

Athlete	Events	Result	Rank
Ana Talakai	Shot Put F11-12	7.44	12

== Broadcasting ==
No broadcaster had the rights to the Games in Tonga. The Games were available via live streaming on the International Paralympic Committee website.

== See also ==
- Tonga at the 2016 Summer Olympics
