= Tonga at the 1988 Summer Olympics =

- IOC code: TGA
- NOC: Tonga Sports Association and National Olympic Committee

in Seoul
- Competitors: 5 (4 men and 1 woman) in 2 sports
- Flag bearer: Siololovau Ikavuka
- Medals: Gold 0 Silver 0 Bronze 0 Total 0

Summer Olympics appearances (overview)
- 1984; 1988; 1992; 1996; 2000; 2004; 2008; 2012; 2016; 2020; 2024

Tonga competed at the 1988 Summer Olympics in Seoul, South Korea.

== Competitors ==
The following is the list of number of competitors in the Games.

Sport	Men	Women	Total
Athletics	1	1	2
Boxing	3	–	3
Total	4	1	5

== Athletics ==
Men

=== Track events ===
Athlete	Events	Heat		Semifinal		Final	
Athlete	Events	Time	Position	Time	Position	Time	Position
Peauope Suli	100 m	10.94	79	Did not advance			
Peauope Suli	200 m	22.49	64	Did not advance			

Women

=== Field events ===
Athlete	Event	Qualifying		Final	
Athlete	Event	Distance	Position	Distance	Position
Siololovau Ikavuka	Shot put	12.31m	25	Did not advance	
Siololovau Ikavuka	Discus	44.94m	21	Did not advance	

== Boxing ==
Athlete	Event	Round of 32	Round of 16	Quarterfinals	Semifinals	Final
Athlete	Event	Opposition Result	Opposition Result	Opposition Result	Opposition Result	Opposition Result
Filipo Palako Vaka	Middleweight	Kieran Joyce (IRL); L RSCO	Did not advance			
Sione Vaveni Taliaʻuli	Light Heavyweight	Tommy Bauro (SOL); W KOH	Joseph Akhasamba (KEN); L 0-5	Did not advance		
Tualau Fale	Heavyweight	Harold Obunga (KEN); L RSCH	Did not advance			
