= Joni Nyman =

Finnish boxer

Personal information
- Born: 5 September 1962 (age 64)
Medal record
Men's Boxing
Representing Finland
Olympic Games
Bronze medal – third place	1984 Los Angeles	Welterweight
European Amateur Championships
Silver medal – second place	1985 Budapest	Welterweight

Joni Nyman (born 5 September 1962 in Pori) is a retired boxer (pugilist) from Finland, who won a Welterweight Bronze medal at the 1984 Summer Olympics. He also competed at the 1988 Summer Olympics in Seoul, South Korea, where he was defeated in the quarterfinals.

== Olympic results ==
1984 – Los Angeles (as a welterweight)

- Round of 64: bye
- Round of 32: Defeated Georges-Claude Ngangue (Cameroon) by decision, 5–0
- Round of 16: Defeated Kieran Joyce (Ireland) by decision, 4–1
- Quarterfinal: Defeated Dwight Frazier (Jamaica) by decision, 5–0
- Semifinal: Lost to An Young-Su (South Korea) by decision, 2–3 (was awarded bronze medal)

1988 – Seoul (as a welterweight)

- Defeated Manny Sobral (Canada) 4–1
- Defeated Sören Antman (Sweden) 5–0
- Defeated Dimus Chisala (Zambia) 5–0
- Lost to Kenneth Gould (United States) 0–5

== Pro career ==
Known as "Joltin' Joni", Nyman turned pro in 1988. Nyman retired in 1998 and returned in 2005 for one bout, retiring with a 14-6-1 record.
