= Tonga at the 2024 Summer Paralympics =

- IPC code: TON
- NPC: Tonga National Paralympic Committee

in Paris, France August 28, 2024 – September 8, 2024
- Competitors: 1 in 1 sport
- Flag bearer: Maleane Vasitai Leaaepeni Falemaka
- Medals: Gold 0 Silver 0 Bronze 0 Total 0

Summer Paralympics appearances (overview)
- 2000; 2004; 2008; 2012; 2016; 2020; 2024

Tonga competed at the 2024 Summer Paralympics in Paris, France, from 28 August to 8 September 2024. The delegation consisted of only one competitor from one sport.

== Competitors ==
The following is the list of number of competitors in the Games.

| Sport | Men | Women | Total |
|---|---|---|---|
| Athletics | 0 | 1 | 1 |
| Total | 0 | 1 | 1 |

== Athletics ==
| Athlete | Event | Final | |
| Athlete | Event | Result | Rank |
|---|---|---|---|
| Meleane Vasitai Leaaepeni Falemaka | Women's discus throw F38 | 16.71 PB | 14 |

== See also ==
- Tonga at the 2024 Summer Olympics
- Tonga at the Paralympics
