= Toluta'u Koula (rugby league) =

Tonga international rugby league footballer

Tolu Koula
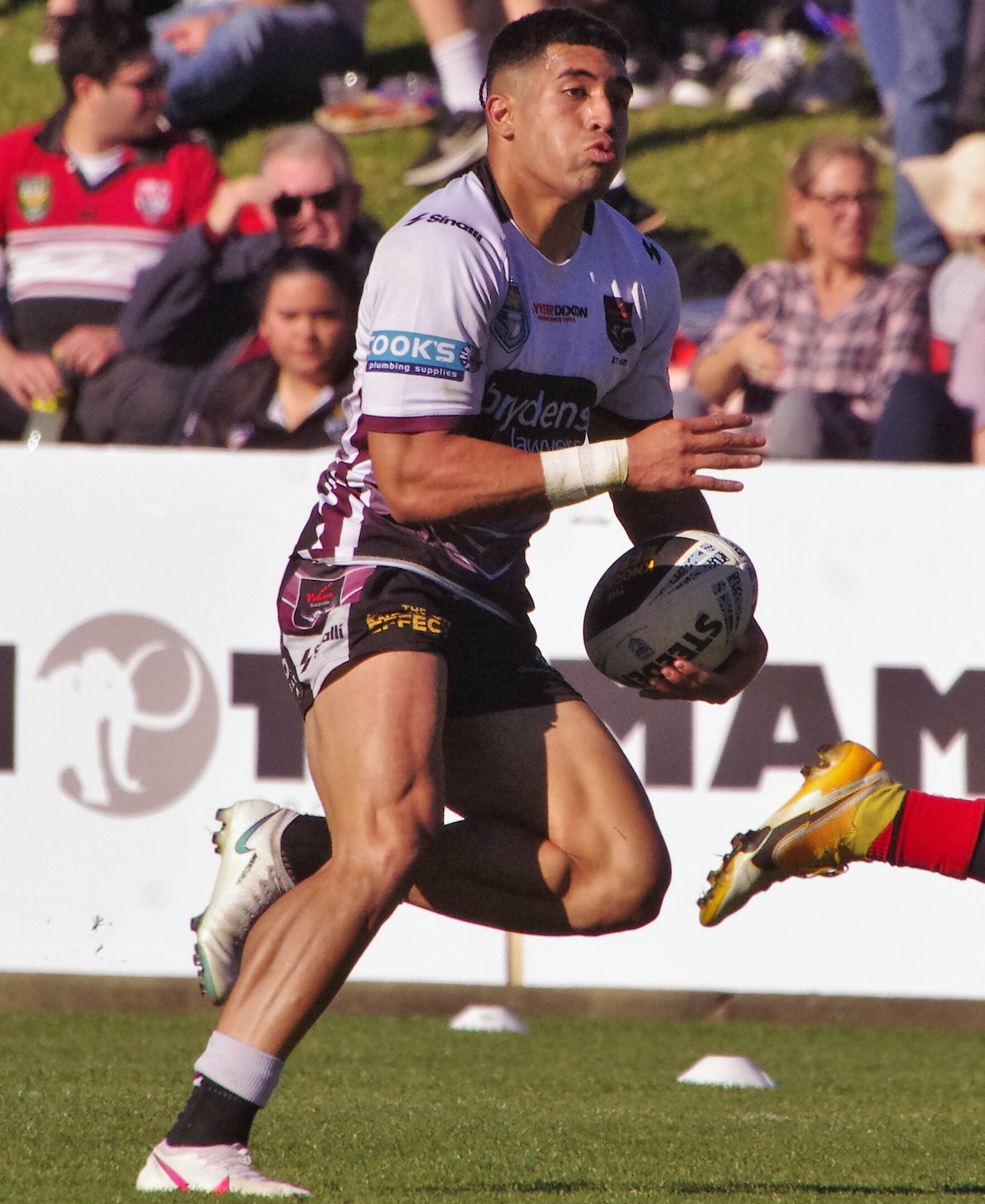

Personal information
- Full name: Tolutau Koula Jr
- Born: 2 September 2002 (age 24) Sydney, New South Wales, Australia
- Height: 180 cm (5 ft 11 in)
- Weight: 88 kg (13 st 12 lb)

Playing information
- Position: Centre, Fullback
Club
Years	Team	Pld	T	G	FG	P
2022–	Manly Sea Eagles	101	47	0	0	188
Representative
Years	Team	Pld	T	G	FG	P
2022–	Tonga	12	5	0	0	20
2026	New South Wales	3	0	0	0	0
- Source: As of 7 November 2026
- Parents: Tolutau Koula Sr (father); Ana Siulolo Liku (mother)

Tolutau Koula (born 2 September 2002) is a Tonga international rugby league footballer who plays as a centre and fullback for the Manly Warringah Sea Eagles in the National Rugby League and the New South Wales Rugby League Team at international level.

== Background ==
Koula's parents represented Tonga at multiple Olympic Games. His father, Tolutau Koula Sr, was a sprinter and his mother, Ana Siulolo Liku, was a hurdler who had the honour of being the Tongan flag bearer at the 2000 Summer Olympics in Sydney.

Koula Jr set the GPS sprint record in 2019 at 10.58 seconds (his father's fastest 100 metre time was a 10.56). He graduated from Newington College in 2020, where he played rugby union and was the Athletics Captain.

== Playing career ==
=== 2022 ===
Koula made his debut in round 1 of the 2022 NRL season for Manly-Warringah in a 28–6 loss to Penrith. Following this, he was announced as a member of the Tongan national rugby league team, where he will start at fullback against New Zealand on June 25.

Koula played 20 games for Manly in the 2022 NRL season as the club finished 11th on the table and missed out on the finals. He was one of seven players involved in the Manly pride jersey player boycott.

=== 2023 ===
In round 15 of the 2023 NRL season, Koula scored two tries for Manly in their 58–18 victory over the Dolphins. In round 21, Koula scored two tries for Manly in their 30–26 victory over rivals Cronulla in the battle of the beaches game. In round 27, Koula scored two tries in Manly's 54–12 victory over the Wooden Spoon side Wests Tigers. Koula played 19 games for Manly in the 2023 NRL season and scored eight tries as the club finished 12th on the table and missed the finals once again.

=== 2024 ===
He played a total of 21 games for Manly in the 2024 NRL season as they finished 7th on the table and qualified for the finals. Manly would be eliminated in the second week of the finals by the Sydney Roosters.

=== 2025 ===
In round 10 of the 2025 NRL season, Koula scored two tries for Manly in their 30-14 loss against rivals Cronulla.

Koula had a breakout season for Manly in 2025. Despite the team failing to reach the finals, Koula was a standout for the team with his running game and pace coming to the fore. He led the club try scoring list with 17 tries (5th in the NRL for the season) while almost doubling his career averages in run metres, tackle breaks and line breaks. His efforts in 2025 for Manly saw Tolu Koula named as the Roy Bull Manly Player of the Year, while his efforts didn't go unnoticed by his team mates and he was named the 2025 Manly Players Player. Unfortunately for Koula, an almost certain selection for Tonga in the post season Pacific Championships took a hit when he ruptured the MCL in his left knee soon after scoring his 17th try for the season in Manly's 40–24 win over St George Illawarra at Jubilee Oval in the penultimate round of the 2025 season.

=== 2026 ===
On 21 February 2026, Manly announced that Koula had re-signed with the club until the end of 2031. In May, Koula was selected by New South Wales in the 2026 State of Origin series. Koula was taken from the field during the second half of the match after he was hit in the head by Queensland fullback Kalyn Ponga. Koula has won the 2026 State of Origin series with New South Wales.

== Statistics ==
Year	Team	Games	Tries	Pts
2022	Manly Warringah Sea Eagles	20	6	24
2023	Manly Warringah Sea Eagles	19	8	32
2024	Manly Warringah Sea Eagles	21	7	28
2025	Manly Warringah Sea Eagles	22	17	68
2026	Manly Warringah Sea Eagles	13	6	24
2027	Manly Warringah Sea Eagles			
	Totals	95	44	176
