= 2020 Oceania Taekwondo Olympic Qualification Tournament =

Taekwondo competition

The 2020 Oceania Taekwondo Qualification Tournament for Tokyo Olympic Games took place in Gold Coast, Queensland, Australia. The tournament was held on 29 February 2020. Each country may enter a maximum of 2 male and 2 female divisions with only one athlete in each division. The winners per division qualify for the Olympic Games under their NOC.

== Qualification summary ==
NOC	Men				Women				Total
NOC	−58kg	−68kg	−80kg	+80kg	−49kg	−57kg	−67kg	+67kg	Total
Australia	X		X			X		X	4
New Zealand		X							1
Tonga				X			X		2
Total: 3 NOCs	1	1	1	1	0	1	1	1	7

== Men ==
=== −58 kg ===
- Safwan Khalil (AUS) qualified automatically.

=== −68 kg ===
Semifinals		Final
		Tom Burns (NZL)	35
Uhila Langi (TGA)	12	Rainner Pennie (PNG)	25
Rainner Pennie (PNG)	19

=== −80 kg ===
Semifinals		Final
		Jack Marton (AUS)	WD
Alexander Allen (GUM)	18	Alexander Allen (GUM)
Max Watene (NZL)	10

=== +80 kg ===
Final
Pita Taufatofua (TGA)	20
Steven Tommy (PNG)	4

== Women ==
=== −49 kg ===
- Cancelled due to no entries.

=== −57 kg ===
Final
Stacey Hymer (AUS)	33
Theresa Vili (SAM)	0

=== −67 kg ===
- Malia Paseka (TGA) qualified automatically.

=== +67 kg ===
Final
Reba Stewart (AUS)	15
Taylor Shaw (NZL)	3
