= Disability in Tonga =

Based on the survey conducted by the Tonga Red Cross Society and Disability Advisory Committee, there are 2,782 people with varying degrees of disability in Tonga, which makes up about 2.8% of the total population.

== History ==
In 2007, Tonga signed the Convention on the Rights of Persons with Disabilities but have not ratified yet up to date.

== Classification ==
In 1996, disabilities in Tonga consisted of mental disability (43.8%), intellectual disability (24.6%), physical disability (14.5%), hearing impairment (8.9%), visual impairment (5.4%) and others (2.8%).

== See also ==
- Tonga at the Paralympics
- Demographics of Tonga
