= Tonga at the 2016 Summer Olympics =

- IOC code: TGA
- NOC: Tonga Sports Association and National Olympic Committee
- Website: www.oceaniasport.com/tonga

in Rio de Janeiro
- Competitors: 7 in 4 sports
- Flag bearer (opening): Pita Taufatofua
- Flag bearer (closing): Siueni Filimone
- Medals: Gold 0 Silver 0 Bronze 0 Total 0

Summer Olympics appearances (overview)
- 1984; 1988; 1992; 1996; 2000; 2004; 2008; 2012; 2016; 2020; 2024; 2028

Tonga competed at the 2016 Summer Olympics in Rio de Janeiro, Brazil, from 5 to 21 August 2016. This is the nation's ninth consecutive appearance at the Summer Olympics.

Tonga Sports Association and National Olympic Committee sent the nation's largest delegation to the Games since its official debut at the 1984 Summer Olympics in Los Angeles. A total of seven athletes, four men and three women, were selected to the Tongan team across four different sports; four of them granted universality places to compete in their respective sporting events, with the other three qualifying for the Games on merit through continental tournaments.

Breaststroke swimmer Amini Fonua was the only Tongan athlete to have represented at the previous Games, with the rest of the field making their Olympic debut in Rio de Janeiro. Tonga's first ever taekwondo fighter and oldest competitor (aged 32) at the Olympics, Pita Taufatofua, who led his delegation as the flag bearer in the opening ceremony, instantly became an internet sensation by millions of viewers, when he marched into the Maracanã Stadium shirtless, smothered in coconut oil, and dressed in a traditional ta'ovala (a Tongan mat).

Tonga, however, failed to win its first Olympic medal since the 1996 Summer Olympics in Atlanta, where boxer Paea Wolfgramm bagged the silver in the men's super heavyweight division.

== Archery ==
One Tongan archer has qualified each for the men's and women's individual recurve at the Olympics with a top two finish at the Oceania Qualification Tournament in Nuku'alofa. This is Tonga's return to the Olympic competition in the sport after a 12-year hiatus.

Athlete	Event	Ranking round		Round of 64	Round of 32	Round of 16	Quarterfinals	Semi-finals	Final / BM	
Athlete	Event	Score	Seed	Opposition Score	Opposition Score	Opposition Score	Opposition Score	Opposition Score	Opposition Score	Rank
Arne Jensen	Men's individual	604	61	van den Berg (NED); L 3–7	Did not advance					
Lusitania Tatafu	Women's individual	559	63	Chang H-j (KOR); L 0–6	Did not advance					

== Athletics ==
Tonga received universality slots from IAAF to send two athletes (one male and one female) to the Olympics.

Key

- Note–Ranks given for track events are within the athlete's heat only
- Q = Qualified for the next round
- q = Qualified for the next round as a fastest loser or, in field events, by position without achieving the qualifying target
- NR = National record
- N/A = Round not applicable for the event
- Bye = Athlete not required to compete in round

Track & road events

Athlete	Event	Heat		Quarter-final		Semi-final		Final	
Athlete	Event	Result	Rank	Result	Rank	Result	Rank	Result	Rank
Siueni Filimone	Men's 100 m	10.76	2 Q	DNS		Did not advance			
Taina Halasima	Women's 100 m	12.80	6	Did not advance					

== Swimming ==
Tonga has received a Universality invitation from FINA to send two swimmers (one male and one female) to the Olympics.

Athlete	Event	Heat		Semi-final		Final	
Athlete	Event	Time	Rank	Time	Rank	Time	Rank
Amini Fonua	Men's 100 m breaststroke	1:06.40	45	Did not advance			
Irene Prescott	Women's 50 m freestyle	28.68	61	Did not advance			

== Taekwondo ==
Tonga entered one athlete into the taekwondo competition for the first time at the Olympics. Pita Taufatofua secured a spot in the men's heavyweight category (+80 kg) by virtue of his top finish at the 2016 Oceania Olympic Qualification Tournament in Port Moresby, Papua New Guinea.

Athlete	Event	Round of 16	Quarterfinals	Semi-finals	Repechage	Final / BM	
Athlete	Event	Opposition Result	Opposition Result	Opposition Result	Opposition Result	Opposition Result	Rank
Pita Taufatofua	Men's +80 kg	Mardani (IRI); L 1–16 PTG	Did not advance				

== See also ==
- Tonga at the 2018 Winter Olympics
