= Tonga at the 2008 Summer Paralympics =

- IPC code: TGA
- NPC: Tonga National Paralympic Committee

in Beijing
- Competitors: 1 in 1 sport
- Medals: Gold 0 Silver 0 Bronze 0 Total 0

Summer Paralympics appearances (overview)
- 2000; 2004; 2008; 2012; 2016; 2020; 2024

Tonga sent a delegation to compete at the 2008 Summer Paralympics in Beijing, China.

The Tonga National Olympic Committee initially reported that the country's sole representative would be Sione Manu, in the men's shot put. However, in the end, Manu was not part of Tonga's delegation, and the nation's single competitor was Mounga Okusitino, in the men's 100 metre sprint for athletes with cerebral palsy.

== Athletics ==
Name	Event	Time	Rank
Mounga Okusitino	Men's 100 metres T37	14.81	6th (out of 6) in heat 1; did not advance

== See also ==
- Tonga at the Paralympics
- Tonga at the 2008 Summer Olympics
