= Tonga at the 1992 Summer Olympics =

- IOC code: TGA
- NOC: Tonga Sports Association and National Olympic Committee
- Website: www.oceaniasport.com/tonga

in Barcelona
- Competitors: 5 men in 2 sports
- Medals: Gold 0 Silver 0 Bronze 0 Total 0

Summer Olympics appearances (overview)
- 1984; 1988; 1992; 1996; 2000; 2004; 2008; 2012; 2016; 2020; 2024

Tonga was represented at the 1992 Summer Olympics in Barcelona, Catalonia, Spain by the Tonga Sports Association and National Olympic Committee.

In total, five athletes – all men – represented Tonga in two different sports including athletics and weightlifting.

== Competitors ==
In total, five athletes represented Tonga at the 1992 Summer Olympics in Barcelona, Catalonia, Spain across two different sports.

Sport	Men	Women	Total
Athletics	4	0	4
Weightlifting	1	–	1
Total	5	0	5

== Athletics ==
In total, four Tongan athletes participated in the athletics events – Paeaki Kokohu in the men's 400 m hurdles, Toluta'u Koula in the men's 100 m, Mateaki Mafi in the men's 200 m and Homelo Vi in the decathlon.

The heats for the men's 100 m took place on 31 July 1992. Koula finished sixth in his heat in a time of 10.85 seconds and he did not advance to the quarter-finals.

The heats for the men's 400 m hurdles took place on 3 August 1992. Kokohu finished fifth in his heat in a time of 56.99 seconds and he did not advance to the semi-finals.

The heats for the men's 200 m took place on 3 August 1992. Mafi finished fifth in his heat in a time of 22.05 seconds and he did not advance to the quarter-finals.

Athlete	Event	Heat		Quarterfinal		Semifinal		Final	
Athlete	Event	Result	Rank	Result	Rank	Result	Rank	Result	Rank
Toluta'u Koula	100 m	10.85	6	did not advance					
Mateaki Mafi	200 m	22.05	5	did not advance					
Paeaki Kokohu	400 m hurdles	56.99	5	n/a		did not advance			

The decathlon took place on 5 and 6 August 1992. Vi completed all ten events and scored a total of 6,768 points to finish 26th overall.

Athlete	Event		100 m	LJ	SP	HJ	400 m	110H	DT	PV	JT	1500 m	Final	Rank
Homelo Vi	Decathlon	Result	11.14	6.91	11.97	1.82	51.45	15.70	40.68	4.00	52.32	5:17.57	6768	26
Homelo Vi	Decathlon	Points	830	792	605	644	749	767	678	617	623	463	6768	26

== Weightlifting ==
In total, one Tongan athlete participated in the weightlifting events – Uasi Vi Kohinoa in the –75 kg category.

The −75 kg took place on 30 July 1992. Kohinoa lifted 85 kg (snatch) and 115 kg (clean and jerk) for a combined score of 200 kg which placed him 31st in the overall rankings.

Athlete	Event	Snatch		Clean & Jerk		Total	Rank
Athlete	Event	Result	Rank	Result	Rank	Total	Rank
Uasi Vi Kohinoa	75 kg	85.0	33	115.0	31	200.0	31
