= Tonga at the 2000 Summer Paralympics =

- IPC code: TGA
- NPC: Tonga National Paralympic Committee

in Sydney
- Competitors: 1 in 1 sport
- Medals: Gold 0 Silver 0 Bronze 0 Total 0

Summer Paralympics appearances (overview)
- 2000; 2004; 2008; 2012; 2016; 2020; 2024

Tonga sent a delegation to compete at the 2000 Summer Paralympics in Sydney, Australia. The country was represented by a single athlete, Alailupe Valeti (also referred to as Alailupe Tualau), who competed in the discus and in the shot put, in events for visually impaired athletes. It was Tonga's first participation in the Paralympic Games.

== Athletics ==
Name	Event	Result	Rank
Alailupe Valeti	Women's Discus F12	17.90 m	10th (out of 10)
Alailupe Valeti	Women's Shot Put F12	7.13 m	7th (out of 7)

== See also ==
- Tonga at the Paralympics
- Tonga at the 2000 Summer Olympics
