= Tonga at the 2004 Summer Paralympics =

- IPC code: TGA
- NPC: Tonga National Paralympic Committee

in Athens
- Competitors: 1 in 1 sport
- Medals: Gold 0 Silver 0 Bronze 0 Total 0

Summer Paralympics appearances (overview)
- 2000; 2004; 2008; 2012; 2016; 2020; 2024

Tonga sent a delegation to compete at the 2004 Summer Paralympics in Athens, Greece. The country was represented by a single athlete, Alailupe Valeti (also referred to as Alailupe Tualau), who competed in a shot put event for visually impaired athletes.

== Athletics ==
Name	Event	Result	Rank
Alailupe Valeti	Women's Shot Put F12	7.48 m	10th (out of 11)

== See also ==
- Tonga at the Paralympics
- Tonga at the 2004 Summer Olympics
