= Tonga at the 2012 Summer Paralympics =

- IPC code: TGA
- NPC: Tonga National Paralympic Committee

in London
- Competitors: 1 in 1 sport
- Flag bearer: ʻAloʻalo Liku
- Officials: 2
- Medals: Gold 0 Silver 0 Bronze 0 Total 0

Summer Paralympics appearances (overview)
- 2000; 2004; 2008; 2012; 2016; 2020; 2024

An interview with the chef de mission of the Tonga Paralympic delegation at the London Paralympics

Tonga participated in the 2012 Summer Paralympics in London, United Kingdom, from August 29 to September 9, 2012. Their participation marked their fourth consecutive Summer Paralympics appearance since their début at the 2000 Summer Paralympics in Sydney. Tonga was represented by the Tonga National Paralympic Committee, and was one of the 45 participating countries that sent only a single athlete. Tonga has always sent only a single athlete from Sydney 2000 to London 2012. Tonga National Paralympic Committee sent a delegation of three people, including one athlete. The sole athlete to represent the nation was ʻAloʻalo Liku, who participated in javelin and discus throw. Liku was the country's flag-bearer during the Games' opening ceremony. Tonga did not win a medal at these Games, however Liku finished with seasonal bests in both the events.

== Background ==
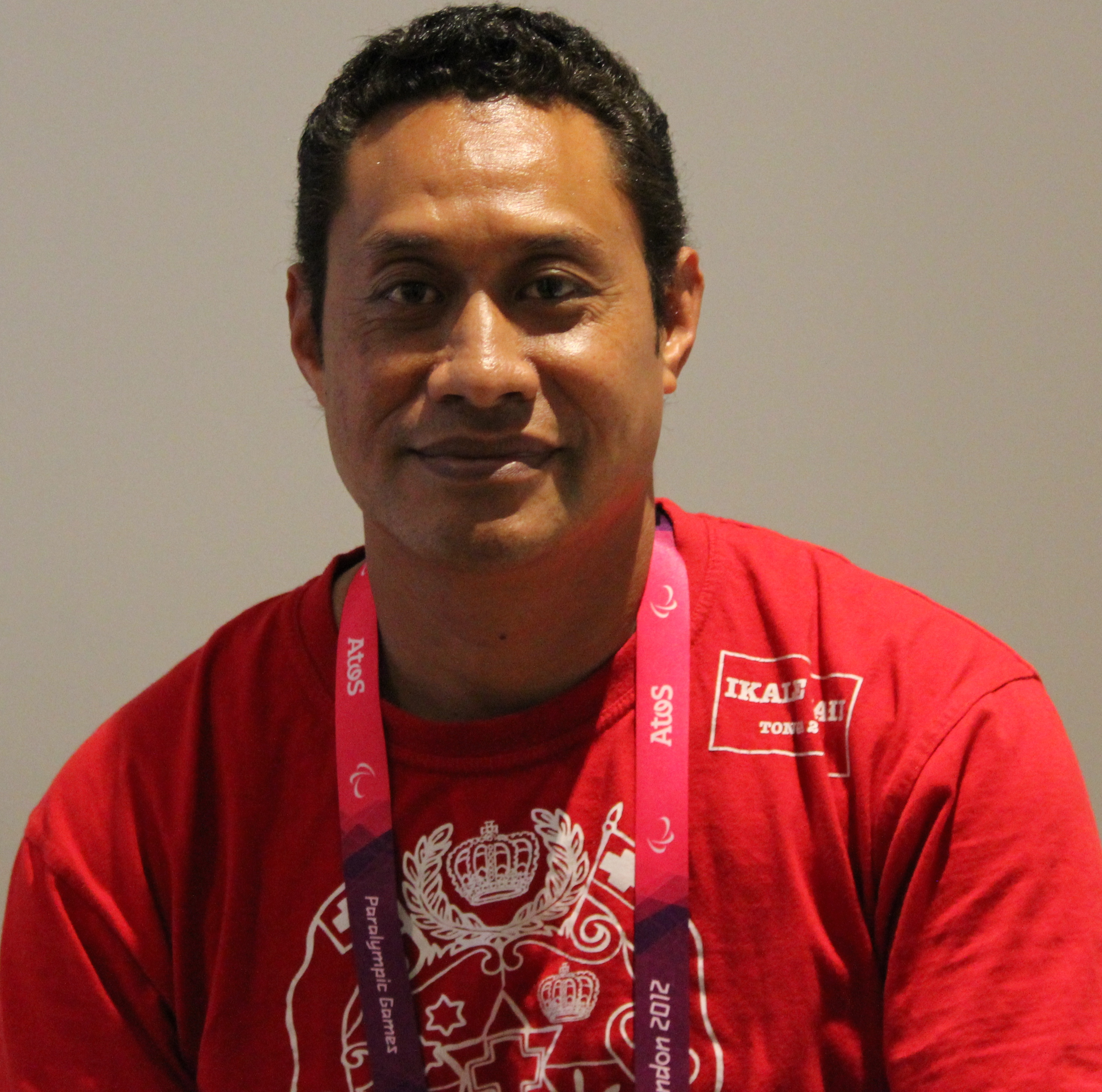
President of the Tonga National Paralympic Committee and chef de mission of Tonga for the 2012 Summer Paralympics Viliami Tufui.

Tonga's début in the Paralympics was in Sydney during the 2000 Summer Olympics, and it has participated in every Summer Paralympics between then and the London Paralympics in 2012–numbering four in total. In all the editions of the Games, Tonga has sent only one athlete. In Sydney 2000 and in Athens 2004, Alailupe Tualau participated on Tonga's behalf. Mounga Okusitino represented Tonga in the 2008 Summer Paralympics in Beijing.

In 2012 Summer Paralympics, Tonga was one of the 45 participating countries that sent only a single athlete. The Tongan delegation for the 2012 Summer Paralympics consisted of three men. ʻAloʻalo Liku, was the only athlete and competed in the two events of athletics— javelin throw and discus throw. President of the National Paralympic Committee of Tonga, Tonga National Paralympic Committee, Viliami Tufui accompanied as a chef de mission of nation for the Games. The final member of the delegation was Tevita Vake, who joined the delegation as coach of Liku. ʻAloʻalo Liku was the nation's flag bearer at the opening ceremony.

== Athletics ==
ʻAloʻalo Liku represented Tonga in the men's discus F44 and the men's javelin F44. F44 is a disability sport classification which encompasses field athletes who are afflicted with a disability that affects their arms or legs, and it also includes amputees. Factory worker Liku started participating in athletics just two years before the Games. Since Liku was Tonga's only participant, he was also the opening ceremonies flag bearer.

Javelin throw F44 event, in which ten athletes participated, was scheduled on September 2 at the London Olympic Stadium. Liku's best throw of 34.61 m came in his second attempt, and his third and final attempt was of 31.07 m. He finished tenth with a seasonal best, behind Cape Verde's Marcio Fernandes, whose best throw was 46.04 m—a regional record.

On September 6, Liku competed in discus throw F44. On his sixth and last attempt, Liku threw a discus seasonal best of 32.73 m and with this finished at eighth spot in the final standings. In this event, Jeremy Campbell of United States set a new Paralympic record with a throw of 60.05 m.

Men's Field Events

Athlete	Event	Final	
Athlete	Event	Distance	Rank
ʻAloʻalo Liku	Discus Throw F44	32.73	8
ʻAloʻalo Liku	Javelin Throw F44	34.61	10

== See also ==
- Summer Paralympic disability classification
- Tonga at the Paralympics
- Tonga at the 2012 Summer Olympics
