= Tonga at the 1984 Summer Olympics =

- IOC code: TGA (TON used at these Games)
- NOC: Tonga Sports Association and National Olympic Committee

in Los Angeles
- Competitors: 7 (7 men and 0 women) in 1 sport
- Flag bearer: Fine Sani
- Medals: Gold 0 Silver 0 Bronze 0 Total 0

Summer Olympics appearances (overview)
- 1984; 1988; 1992; 1996; 2000; 2004; 2008; 2012; 2016; 2020; 2024

Tonga competed in the Olympic Games for the first time at the 1984 Summer Olympics in Los Angeles, United States.

== Boxing ==
Men

Athlete	Event	First round	Second round	Third round	Quarterfinals	Semifinals	Final
Athlete	Event	Opposition Result	Opposition Result	Opposition Result	Opposition Result	Opposition Result	Opposition Result
Lisiate Lavulo	Light Welterweight	BYE	Javid Aslam (NOR); L RSC-2	Did not advance			
Saikoloni Hala	Welterweight	BYE	Vedat Önsöy (TUR); L 0-5	Did not advance			
Elone Lutui	Light Middleweight	BYE	Fubulune Inyana (ZAI); W 4-1	Israel Cole (SLE); L RSC-2	Did not advance		
Otosico Havili	Middleweight	Aristides González (PUR); L 1-4	Did not advance	—N/a	Did not advance		
Fine Sani	Light Heavyweight	BYE	Georgica Donici (ROU); L 0-5	—N/a	Did not advance		
Tevita Taufo'ou	Heavyweight	BYE	Loi Faateete (SAM); W 4-1	—N/a	Henry Tillman (USA); L RSC-2	Did not advance	
Viliami Pulu	Super heavyweight	BYE	—N/a		Robert Wells (GBR); L KO-1	Did not advance	
