= Tonga at the 2000 Summer Olympics =

- IOC code: TGA
- NOC: Tonga Sports Association and National Olympic Committee
- Website: www.oceaniasport.com/tonga

in Sydney
- Competitors: 3 (2 men and 1 woman) in 2 sports
- Flag bearer: Ana Siulolo Liku
- Medals: Gold 0 Silver 0 Bronze 0 Total 0

Summer Olympics appearances (overview)
- 1984; 1988; 1992; 1996; 2000; 2004; 2008; 2012; 2016; 2020; 2024; 2028

Tonga sent a delegation to compete at the 2000 Summer Olympics in Sydney, Australia from 15 September to 1 October 2000. Sydney was Tonga's fifth consecutive appearance at a Summer Olympic Games. The Tongan delegation to Sydney consisted of two track and field athletes; Toluta'u Koula and Ana Siulolo Liku; and weightlifter Tevita Kofe Ngalu. Neither of the track athletes advanced beyond the first round of their events, while Ngalu came 13th in the men's 105 kg category.

== Background ==
The Tonga Sports Association and National Olympic Committee was recognized by the International Olympic Committee on 1 January 1984. The Kingdom of Tonga made its Olympic debut at the 1984 Summer Olympics, and has appeared at every Summer Olympic Games since then, making these Sydney Games their fifth appearance. They did not make their debut in the Winter Olympic Games until the 2014 Sochi Olympics. The 2000 Summer Olympics were held from 15 September to 1 October 2000; a total of 10,651 athletes represented 199 National Olympic Committees. The Tongan delegation consisted of two track and field athletes; Toluta'u Koula and Ana Siulolo Liku; and weightlifter Tevita Kofe Ngalu. Liku was chosen as the flag-bearer for the opening ceremony.

== Athletics ==
Toluta'u Koula was 30 years old at the time of the Sydney Olympics. He was making his third consecutive and final Olympic appearance, having previously represented Tonga at the 1992 and 1996 Summer Olympics. On 22 September, he was drawn into heat four of the first round of the men's 100 meters; he finished the race in 11.01 seconds, ninth and last in his heat, and was eliminated. The gold medal was eventually won in 9.87 seconds by Maurice Greene of the United States; the silver was won by Ato Boldon of Trinidad and Tobago; and the bronze was earned by Obadele Thompson of Barbados.

Ana Siulolo Liku was 26 years old at the time of these Olympics, and had also previously represented Tonga at the 1996 Atlanta Olympics. On 25 September, she was drawn into heat three of the women's 100 meter hurdles, where she finished the race in a time of 14.58 seconds. This put her eighth and last in her heat, and she was eliminated. The gold medal was won by Olga Shishigina of Kazakhstan in a time of 12.65 seconds, the silver by Nigeria's Glory Alozie, and the bronze was won by Melissa Morrison of the United States.

| Athlete | Event | Heat | | Quarterfinal | | Semifinal | | Final | |
| Athlete | Event | Result | Rank | Result | Rank | Result | Rank | Result | Rank |
|---|---|---|---|---|---|---|---|---|---|
| Toluta'u Koula | Men's 100 m | 11.01 | 9 | did not advance | | | | | |
| Ana Siulolo Liku | Women's 100 m hurdles | 14.58 | 8 | did not advance | | | | | |

== Weightlifting ==
Tevita Kofe Ngalu was 27 years old at the time of the Sydney Olympics and was making his only Olympic appearance. On 25 September, he took part in the men's 105 kg competition, where participants could weigh no more than 105 kg. The competition was held in two phases, the clean and jerk, and the snatch with the sum of both lifts determining an athlete's final score; both lifts had to be completed for an athlete to rank for the event and each weightlifter got three attempts in each discipline. In his three attempts at the snatch, Ngalu lifted 122.5 kg and 127.5 kg, before failing on his third attempt at 130 kg, making his mark for the snatch 127.5 kg. This ranked him 17th and last among those setting a mark, however four weightlifters failed to set any mark in the snatch and were not allowed to advance to the clean and jerk.

The clean and jerk portion of the competition was held the same day. In his three attempts, Ngalu lifted 162.5 kg in his first attempt, failed at 167.5 kg in his second attempt, and lifted 167.5 kg in his third and final attempt, making his mark for this portion of the competition 165.5 kg. This placed him 13th and last, although four lifters failed to set a mark in the clean and jerk and went unranked in the competition. Ngalu's final mark was 295 kg for the competition, which placed him in 13th and last among those who completed the event. The gold medal was won by Hossein Tavakkoli of Iran, who set marks of 190 kg in the snatch and 235 kg in the clean and jerk, for a total mark of 425 kg, setting a new Olympic record.

| Athlete | Event | Snatch | | Clean & Jerk | | Total | Rank |
| Athlete | Event | Result | Rank | Result | Rank | Total | Rank |
|---|---|---|---|---|---|---|---|
| Tevita Kofe Ngalu | Men's 105 kg | 127.5 | 17 | 167.5 | 13 | 295.0 | 13 |

== See also ==
- Tonga at the 2000 Summer Paralympics
