= Tonga at the 2012 Summer Olympics =

- IOC code: TGA
- NOC: Tonga Sports Association and National Olympic Committee
- Website: www.oceaniasport.com/tonga

in London
- Competitors: 3 in 2 sports
- Flag bearers: Amini Fonua (opening); Joseph Andy Lui (closing)
- Medals: Gold 0 Silver 0 Bronze 0 Total 0

Summer Olympics appearances (overview)
- 1984; 1988; 1992; 1996; 2000; 2004; 2008; 2012; 2016; 2020; 2024

Tonga participated in the 2012 Summer Olympics in London, United Kingdom, which were held from 27 July to 12 August 2012. The country's participation in London marked its eighth appearance in the Summer Olympics since its debut at the 1984 Summer Olympics. The delegation included three competitors: two in athletics, Joseph Andy Lui and ʻAna Poʻuhila, along with one short distance swimmer Amini Fonua. The latter entry was Tonga's first appearance in Olympic swimming competition. Lui and Fonua qualified through wildcard places while Po'uhila made the games by meeting qualification standards. Fonua was selected as the flag bearer for the opening ceremony while Lui held it at the closing ceremony. Lui and Fonua failed to progress farther than the preliminary round of their respective events while Po'uhila finished 29th in the heat stage of the women's shot put contest.

== Background ==
Tonga participated in eight Summer Olympic Games between its debut at the 1984 Summer Olympics in Los Angeles, United States and the 2012 Summer Olympics in London, England. The country sent its largest delegation to an Olympic Games with seven to the 1984 Summer Olympics. No Tongan athlete has ever won a medal at the Olympic Games. Tonga participated in the London Summer Games between 27 July to 12 August 2012. The Tongan National Olympic Committee (NOC) selected two athletes through wildcard places. Usually, an NOC would be able to enter up to three qualified athletes in each individual event as long as each athlete met the "A" standard, or one athlete per event if they met the "B" standard. However, since Tonga had no athletes that met either standard, they were allowed to select two athletes, one of each gender, as wildcards.

The three athletes that were selected by Tonga to compete at the London Games were Joseph Andy Lui in the men's 100 metres, ʻAna Poʻuhila in the women's shot put contest and Amini Fonua in the men's 100 metre breaststroke. The country's male Olympic football team failed to qualify after being defeated by New Zealand 10-0 in their last group stage match in the OFC Men's Olympic Qualifying Tournament. Along with the three athletes, the country's delegation was led by its chef de mission Ahongalu Fusimalohi. Fonwa was selected as the flag bearer for the opening ceremony while Lui held it at the closing ceremony. Fusimalochi said in June 2012 that the team hoped ten athletes would be qualified, but after that did not occur, he expected that the competitor's performance in London will inspire participants who wanted to compete at the 2016 Summer Olympics in Rio de Janeiro.

== Athletics ==
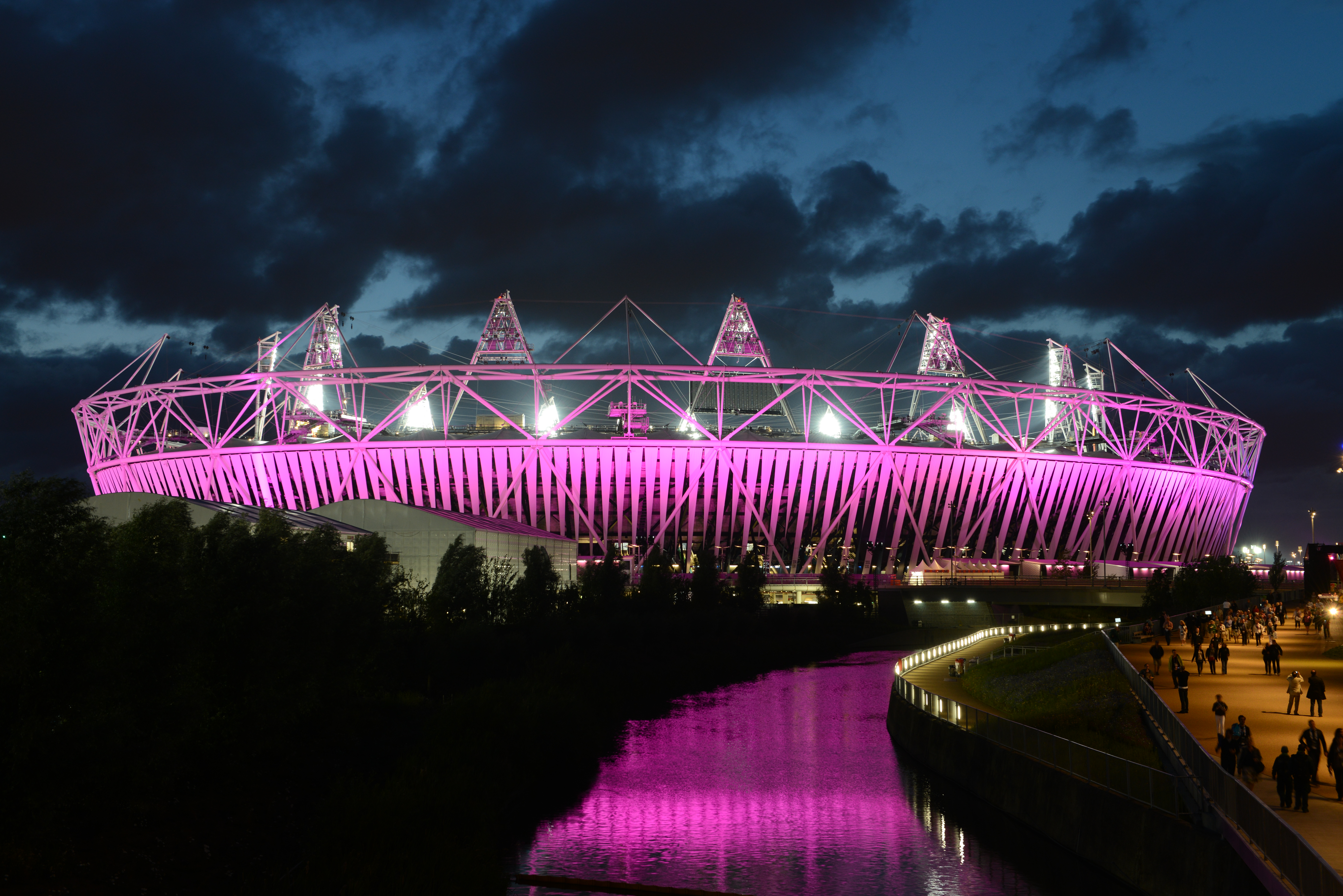
The London Olympic Stadium, where Lui and Poʻuhila competed in athletics events

At the age of 20, Joseph Andy Lui was the youngest person to represent Tonga at the London Games. He had not taken part in any previous Olympic Games, Lui qualified for the Games by using a wildcard because his fastest time of 10.82 seconds, set at the 2011 Oceania Athletics Championships, was 0.58 seconds slower than the "B" qualifying standard for his event, the men's 100 metres. In preparation for the games he trained in his native Tonga and spent one month in Gold Coast, Queensland. Lui was drawn in the first heat of the preliminary round on 4 August, finishing fourth out of seven athletes, with a time of 11.17 seconds. He finished in front of Mohan Khan of Bangladesh (11.25 seconds) but behind Guinea-Bissau's Holder da Silva (10.69 seconds) in a heat led by Bruno Rojas from Bolivia (10.62 seconds). Overall Liu placed 65th out of 75 runners and did not advance into the first round because his time was 0.48 seconds slower than Da' Silva's time who progressed him into the later stages. After the Games he said to ABC Radio Australia that while he did not expect to run quickly, he expressed his desire to represent Tonga at the Rio Games.

ʻAna Poʻuhila was the oldest person (and the sole female athlete) to take part for Tonga at the London Olympic Games at the age of 32. She had participated in the previous two Olympic Games in Athens and Beijing. Po'uhila gained entry into the Games by meeting qualification standards because her best throw of 16.40 metres, set at the 2011 Pacific Games, was 0.90 metres better than the "B" qualifying standard for the women's shot put competition. She spent time in Auckland preparing for the Games. During the qualifying heat of her event, which took place on 7 August, the Tongan field athlete was placed in the sixteen-person second heat. Po'uhila was given three attempts to put the shot as far as she could. During the first attempt, she lobbed the shot 15.80 metres, ranking 14th in her heat. Po'uhila was unable to best the ranking on her ranking when she lobbed it 15.75 metres, placing 11th amongst those who threw during the second try. Her third and final attempt, 15.11 metres, did not beat her first attempt. Using her best mark, 15.80 metres, Po'uhila placed 29th out of 30 athletes who completed the event. She finished ahead of Elena Smolyanova of Uzbekistan (14.42 metres) but behind Taiwan's Lin Chia-ying (17.43 metres) in a heat led by Yevgeniya Kolodko of Russia (19.31 metres). Of the 30 athletes who finished the event Po'uhila finished in 29th, (Note: One athlete, Radoslava Mavrodieva, did not record a mark, and one competitor, Nadzeya Ostapchuk was disqualified.) and did not progress into the final.

Key

- Note–Ranks given for track events are within the athlete's heat only

Men

Athlete	Event	Heat		Quarterfinal		Semifinal		Final	
Athlete	Event	Result	Rank	Result	Rank	Result	Rank	Result	Rank
Joseph Andy Lui	100 m	11.17	4	Did not advance					

Women

Athlete	Event	Qualification		Final	
Athlete	Event	Distance	Position	Distance	Position
Ana Po'uhila	Shot put	15.80	29	Did not advance	

== Swimming ==
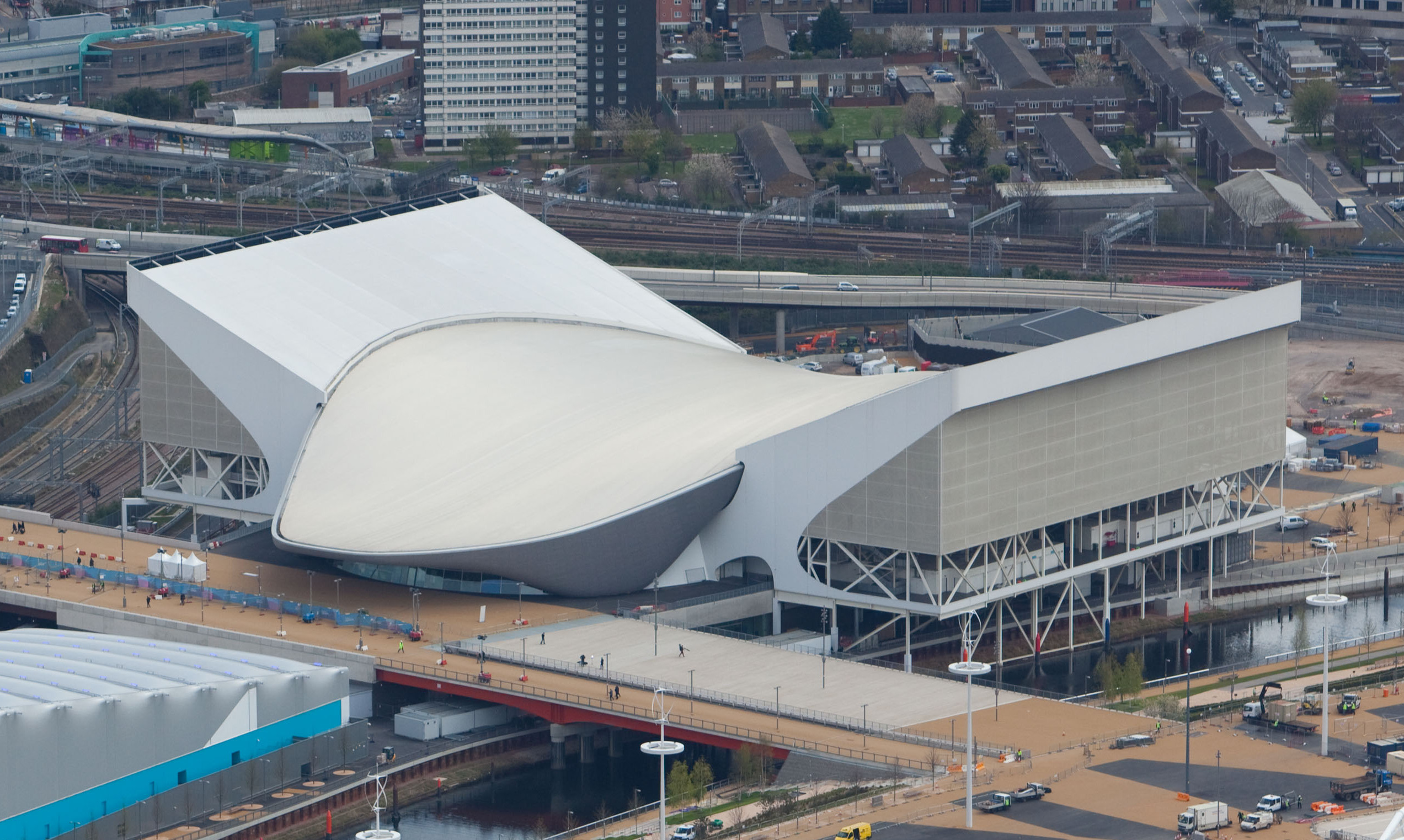
The London Aquatics Centre where Fonua competed in the men's 50 metre freestyle event

Competing at his first Olympics, Amini Fonua was the sole representative to compete in Swimming on Tonga's behalf. He qualified for the games by gaining a universality place from FINA because his time of one minute and 4.02 seconds did not reach the "A" (Olympic Qualifying Time) or "B" (FINA/Olympic Invititional Time) standard entry times for his event, the men's 100 metre breaststroke. Fonua's qualification meant Tonga made their first appearance in Olympic swimming competition. He spent time training in the United States in preparation for the Olympics. In an interview before the Games Fonua stated it was an honour to be his country's first Olympic swimmer and hoped he would not be the only such competitor. He was drawn in the contest's first heat on 28 July, finishing first out of four swimmers, with a time of one minute and 3.65 seconds. Fonua was ahead of the nearest-placed finisher Mubarak Al-Besher of the United Arab Emirates (one minute and 5.26 seconds). Overall he placed 41st out of 44 competitors and was unable to advance into the semi-final after finishing 3.07 seconds slower than the slowest athlete who made the next stage.

Men

Athlete	Event	Heat		Semifinal		Final	
Athlete	Event	Time	Rank	Time	Rank	Time	Rank
Amini Fonua	100 m breaststroke	1:03.65	41	Did not advance			

== See also ==
- Tonga at the 2012 Summer Paralympics
