= Kieran Joyce =

Kieran Joyce may refer to:

- Kieran Joyce (boxer) (born 1964), Irish boxer
- Kieran Joyce (hurler) (born 1987), Irish hurler
- Kieran Joyce (rugby union) (born 1996), Irish rugby union player
