= Tonga at the 2024 Summer Olympics =

- IOC code: TGA
- NOC: Tonga Sports Association and National Olympic Committee
- Website: www.oceaniasport.com/tonga

in Paris, France 26 July 2024 – 11 August 2024
- Competitors: 4 (2 men and 2 women) in 3 sports
- Flag bearers: Maleselo Fufofuka & Noelani Day
- Medals: Gold 0 Silver 0 Bronze 0 Total 0

Summer Olympics appearances (overview)
- 1984; 1988; 1992; 1996; 2000; 2004; 2008; 2012; 2016; 2020; 2024; 2028

Tonga competed at the 2024 Summer Olympics in Paris from 26 July to 11 August 2024. Since the nation's official debut in 1984, Tongan athletes have competed in every edition of the Summer Olympic Games.

== Competitors ==
The following is the list of number of competitors in the Games.

Sport	Men	Women	Total
Athletics	1	0	1
Boxing	0	1	1
Swimming	1	1	2
Total	2	2	4

== Athletics ==
Tonga sent one sprinter to compete at the 2024 Summer Olympics.

Key

- Note–Ranks given for track events are within the athlete's heat only
- Q = Qualified for the next round
- q = Qualified for the next round as a fastest loser or, in field events, by position without achieving the qualifying target
- NR = National record
- N/A = Round not applicable for the event
- Bye = Athlete not required to compete in round

Track events

Athlete	Event	Preliminary		Heat		Semifinal		Final	
Athlete	Event	Result	Rank	Result	Rank	Result	Rank	Result	Rank
Maleselo Fufofuka	Men's 100 m	12.11 PB	45	Did not advance					

== Boxing ==
For the first time since 2004, Tonga entered one female boxer into the Olympic tournament. Fe'ofa'aki Epenisa (women's featherweight) secured her spot through receiving the allocations of universality places, becoming the first female boxer to represent the country at an Olympics.

Athlete	Event	Round of 32	Round of 16	Quarterfinals	Semifinals	Final	
Athlete	Event	Opposition Result	Opposition Result	Opposition Result	Opposition Result	Opposition Result	Rank
Fe'ofa'aki Epenisa	Women's 60 kg	Hà (VIE); L 0–5	Did not advance				

== Swimming ==
Tonga sent two swimmers to compete at the 2024 Paris Olympics.

Athlete	Event	Heat		Semifinal		Final	
Athlete	Event	Time	Rank	Time	Rank	Time	Rank
Alan Uhi	Men's 100 m backstroke	1:00.62	46	Did not advance			
Noelani Day	Women's 50 m freestyle	28.60	51	Did not advance			
