= Tonga at the 2018 Winter Olympics =

- Flag of Tonga
- IOC code: TGA
- NOC: Tonga Sports Association and National Olympic Committee
- Website: www.oceaniasport.com/tonga

in Pyeongchang, South Korea 9–25 February 2018
- Competitors: 1 (1 man) in 1 event
- Flag bearer (opening): Pita Taufatofua
- Flag bearer (closing): Pita Taufatofua
- Medals: Gold 0 Silver 0 Bronze 0 Total 0

Winter Olympics appearances (overview)
- 2014; 2018; 2022–2026

Tonga competed at the 2018 Winter Olympics in Pyeongchang, South Korea, from 9 to 25 February 2018. The country's participation in Pyeongchang marked its second appearance at the Winter Olympics since its debut in the previous Games.

Tonga was represented by a single athlete, cross-country skier Pita Taufatofua, who also served as the country's flag-bearer during the opening and closing ceremonies. He did not win a medal, and as of these Games, Tonga had not earned a Winter Olympic medal.

== Background ==
The Tonga Sports Association and National Olympic Committee was recognized by the International Olympic Committee in 1984. The nation made its first Olympics appearance at the 1984 Summer Olympics. Tonga made its Winter Olympics debut in the previous edition in 2014, and the current edition marked its second consecutive appearance at the Games.

The 2018 Winter Olympics were held in Pyeongchang, South Korea between 9 and 25 February 2018. Tonga was represented by a single athlete, cross-country skier Pita Taufatofua, who also served as the country's flag-bearer during the opening and closing ceremonies. Taufatofua marched into the Pyeongchang Olympic Stadium shirtless, smothered in coconut oil, and dressed in a traditional ta'ovala (a Tongan mat). Tonga did not win a medal, and as of these Games, had not earned a Winter Olympic medal.

== Competitors ==
The Tongan team consisted of a lone athete.

Sport	Men	Women	Total
Cross-country skiing	1	0	1
Total	1	0	1

== Cross-country skiing ==
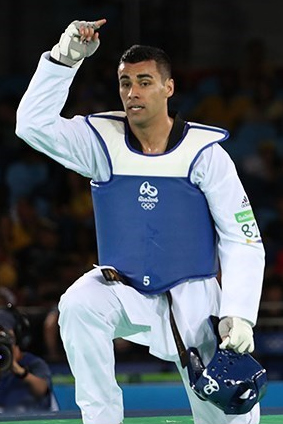
Pita Taufatofua was the only athlete representing Tonga.

As per the "A" standard, athletes with a maximum of 100 distance points were allowed to compete in both the sprint and distance events. NOCs which did not have any athlete meeting the "A" standard were allowed to enter one competitor in the distance event provided that they satisfied the "B" standard of having a maximum of 300 distance points at the end of qualifying on 20 January 2018. Tonga qualified one male athlete, Pita Taufatofua, after he achieved the basic qualification mark to participate in the men's 15 km classical distance event.

This was Taufatofua's second Olympic appearance after he appeared in the 2016 Summer Olympics. He represented Tonga in Taekwondo at the 2016 Summer Games.

The main event was held on 16 February 2018 at the Alpensia Cross-Country Skiing Centre. Taufatofua completed the 15 km (9.3 mi) course in 56:41.1. He finished the race in 114th position (out of 119 competitors), more than 22 minutes behind the winner, Dario Cologna of Switzerland.

Athlete	Event	Time	Deficit	Rank
Pita Taufatofua	Men's 15 km freestyle	56:41.1	+22:57.2	110

== See also ==
- Tonga at the 2016 Summer Olympics
- Tonga at the 2018 Commonwealth Games
