= Tonga at the 2023 World Athletics Championships =

- Flag of Tonga
- WA code: TGA

in Budapest, Hungary 19 August 2023 – 27 August 2023
- Competitors: 1 (1 man and 0 women)
- Medals: Gold 0 Silver 0 Bronze 0 Total 0

World Athletics Championships appearances (overview)
- 1983; 1987; 1991; 1993; 1995; 1997; 1999; 2001; 2003; 2005; 2007; 2009; 2011; 2013; 2015; 2017; 2019; 2022; 2023; 2025

Tonga competed at the 2023 World Athletics Championships in Budapest, Hungary, which were held from 19 to 27 August 2023. The athlete delegation of the country was composed of one competitor, sprinter Melino Tafuna who competed in the men's 100 metres. He qualified for the Championships upon being selected by the Tonga Athletic Association. Despite failing to advance from his preliminary round, he set a new personal best in the event with a time of 11.14 seconds.

== Background ==
The 2023 World Athletics Championships in Budapest, Hungary, were held from 19 to 27 August 2023. The Championships were held at the National Athletics Centre. To qualify for the World Championships, athletes had to reach an entry standard (e.g. time or distance), place in a specific position at select competitions, be a wild card entry, or qualify through their World Athletics Ranking at the end of the qualification period.

As Tonga did not meet any of the four standards, they could send either one male or one female athlete in one event of the Championships who has not yet qualified. The Tonga Athletic Association selected sprinter Melino Tafuna, who would compete in the men's 100 metres. By then, he was unranked in the world at the time of his selection for the Championships. Previously, he had placed second in the event at the Tongan National Championships with an assisted time of 11.08 seconds. He had also placed first in the men's 400 metres, men's long jump, men's 4 × 100 metres relay, and men's 4 × 400 metres relay, and third in the men's 200 metres. At 17 years of age, he was one of the youngest competitors at these World Championships.

== Results ==
Key

- Q = Qualified for the next round
- q = Qualified for the next round as a fastest loser or, in field events, by position without achieving the qualifying target
- NR = National record
- PB = Personal best
- SB = Season best
- N/A = Round not applicable for the event

=== Men ===
Tafuna competed in the third preliminary round of the men's 100 metres on 19 August against seven other sprinters. There, he recorded a time of 11.14 seconds for a new personal best and placed fifth, failing to advance further to the heats.

Track and road events

Athlete	Event	Preliminary		Heat		Semifinal		Final	
Athlete	Event	Result	Rank	Result	Rank	Result	Rank	Result	Rank
Melino Tafuna	100 metres	11.14 PB	5	Did not advance					
