= Tonga at the Paralympics =

- IPC code: TGA
- NPC: Tonga National Paralympic Committee
- Medals: Gold 0 Silver 0 Bronze 0 Total 0

Summer appearances
- 2000; 2004; 2008; 2012; 2016; 2020; 2024

Tonga first participated at the Paralympic Games in 2000, and has sent athletes to compete in every Summer Paralympic Games since then. The country has never taken part in the Winter Paralympics but the country made its debut at the Winter Olympic Games in 2014, which was staged in Sochi with the luger Bruno Banani.

== Full results for Tonga at the Paralympics ==
Name	Games	Sport	Event	Score	Rank
Alailupe Valeti	2000 Sydney	Athletics	Women's Discus F12	17.90 m	10th (out of 10)
Alailupe Valeti	2000 Sydney	Athletics	Women's Shot Put F12	7.13 m	7th (out of 7)
Alailupe Valeti	2004 Athens	Athletics	Women's Shot Put F12	7.48 m	10th (out of 11)
Mounga Okusitino	2008 Beijing	Athletics	Men's 100 metres T37	14.81	6th (out of 6) in heat 1 did not advance
ʻAloʻalo Liku	2012 London	Athletics	Men's discus throw F44	32.73 m	8th (out of 8)
ʻAloʻalo Liku	2012 London	Athletics	Men's javelin F44	34.61 m	10th (out of 10)1 did not advance
Sione Manu	2016 Rio	Athletics	Men's javelin F46	35.62 m	12th (out of 13)
Ana Talakai	2016 Rio	Athletics	Women's shot put F11/12	7.44 m	12th (out of 12)
Meleane Vasitai Leaaepeni Falemaka	2024 Paris	Athletics	Women's discus throw F38	16.71 m	14th (out of 14)

== See also ==
- Tonga at the Olympics
