= Henry Kalunga =

Zambian boxer (died 1994)

Personal information
- Nationality: Zambian
- Died: 1994

Sport
- Sport: Boxing

Henry Kalunga (date of birth unknown, died 1994) was a Zambian boxer. He competed in the men's welterweight event at the 1984 Summer Olympics. He was the 1983 African boxing champion.
