= Khemais Refai =

Tunisian boxer (born 1960)

Personal information
- Nationality: Tunisian
- Born: 17 July 1960 (age 64)

Sport
- Sport: Boxing

Khemais Refai (born 17 July 1960) is a Tunisian boxer. He competed in the men's welterweight event at the 1984 Summer Olympics.
