= Péter Tamton =

Hungarian weightlifter

Personal information
- Nationality: Hungarian
- Born: 19 July 1976 (age 48); Oroszlány, Hungary

Sport
- Sport: Weightlifting

Péter Tamton (born 19 July 1976) is a Hungarian weightlifter. He competed in the men's heavyweight event at the 2000 Summer Olympics.
