= Tonga at the Olympics =

- IOC code: TGA
- NOC: Tonga Sports Association and National Olympic Committee
- Website: www.oceaniasport.com/tonga
- Medals Ranked 137th: Gold 0 Silver 1 Bronze 0 Total 1

Summer appearances
- 1984; 1988; 1992; 1996; 2000; 2004; 2008; 2012; 2016; 2020; 2024; 2028

Winter appearances
- 2014; 2018; 2022–2026

Tonga has competed in 11 Summer Olympic Games since its debut in 1984, and in only 2 Winter Olympic Games: 2014 and 2018. It became the smallest independent nation to win an Olympic medal in the Summer games when Super Heavyweight Boxer Paea Wolfgramm earned silver in the 1996 Super heavyweight 91 kg championships in Atlanta.

Tonga sought to enter a delegation for the 2010 Winter Olympics, which would have been the country's first participation in the Winter Games. The Tonga Amateur Sports Association (TASA) announced that it intended to send one athlete to compete in the luge event. In December 2008, two male athletes (Fuahea Semi and Taniela Tufunga) were selected to travel to Germany for training, although only one of them would compete at the Olympics. Semi was eventually selected as Tonga's candidate to compete in the Games, and was presented by his German sponsors under a new name, "Bruno Banani". He failed to qualify, however, crashing in the final round of qualifications and ending the Kingdom's hopes of competing at the 2010 Games. Banani qualified for the 2014 Winter Olympic Games in Sochi, Russia, becoming the first Tongan athlete to compete at the Winter Games.

== Medal tables ==
=== Medals by Summer Games ===
Games	Athletes	Gold	Silver	Bronze	Total	Rank
(United States) 1984 Los Angeles	7	0	0	0	0	–
(South Korea) 1988 Seoul	5	0	0	0	0	–
(Spain) 1992 Barcelona	5	0	0	0	0	–
(United States) 1996 Atlanta	5	0	1	0	1	61
(Australia) 2000 Sydney	3	0	0	0	0	–
(Greece) 2004 Athens	5	0	0	0	0	–
(China) 2008 Beijing	3	0	0	0	0	–
(United Kingdom) 2012 London	3	0	0	0	0	–
(Brazil) 2016 Rio de Janeiro	7	0	0	0	0	–
(Japan) 2020 Tokyo	6	0	0	0	0	–
(France) 2024 Paris	4	0	0	0	0	–
(United States) 2028 Los Angeles	future event					
(Australia) 2032 Brisbane	future event					
Total		0	1	0	1	137

=== Medals by Winter Games ===
Games	Athletes	Gold	Silver	Bronze	Total	Rank
(Russia) 2014 Sochi	1	0	0	0	0	–
(South Korea) 2018 Pyeongchang	1	0	0	0	0	–
(China) 2022 Beijing	did not participate					
(Italy) 2026 Milano Cortina	did not participate					
(France) 2030 French Alps	future event					
(United States) 2034 Utah	future event					
Total		0	0	0	0	–

=== Medals by summer sport ===
Sport	Gold	Silver	Bronze	Total
Boxing	0	1	0	1
Totals (1 entries)	0	1	0	1

== List of medalists ==
Medal	Name	Games	Sport	Event
Silver	Paea Wolfgramm	1996 Atlanta	Boxing	Men's Super Heavyweight (>91 kg)

== See also ==
- List of flag bearers for Tonga at the Olympics
- Tonga at the Paralympics
- Tropical nations at the Winter Olympics
