= Kitenge Kitengewa =

Congolese boxer (born 1962)

Personal information
- Nationality: Congolese
- Born: 27 June 1962 (age 62)

Sport
- Sport: Boxing

Kitenge Kitengewa (born 27 June 1962) is a Congolese former professional boxer who competed from 1987 to 1989, and held the African super-welterweight title in 1989. As an amateur, he competed in the men's welterweight event at the 1984 Summer Olympics.

== See also ==
- List of African Boxing Union champions
