= Basil Boniface =

Seychellois boxer (born 1962)

Personal information
- Nationality: Seychellois
- Born: 6 January 1962 (age 64)

Sport
- Sport: Boxing

Basil Boniface (born 6 January 1962) is a Seychellois boxer. He competed in the men's welterweight event at the 1984 Summer Olympics. He later was a coach.
