= Francisco Lisboa =

Indonesian boxer

Personal information
- Nationality: Indonesian
- Born: 1 May 1965 (age 60) Uato-Lari, Viqueque, Portuguese Timor

Sport
- Sport: Boxing

Francisco Lisboa (born 1 May 1965) is an Indonesian boxer. He competed in the men's welterweight event at the 1984 Summer Olympics.
