= Konrad König =

Austrian boxer

Personal information
- Nationality: Austrian
- Born: 31 July 1961 (age 63); Hallein, Austria

Sport
- Sport: Boxing

Konrad König (born 31 July 1961) is an Austrian boxer. He competed in the men's welterweight event at the 1984 Summer Olympics.
