= Tonga at the 2004 Summer Olympics =

- IOC code: TGA
- NOC: Tonga Sports Association and National Olympic Committee
- Website: www.oceaniasport.com/tonga

in Athens
- Competitors: 5 in 4 sports
- Flag bearer: Ma'afu Hawke
- Medals: Gold 0 Silver 0 Bronze 0 Total 0

Summer Olympics appearances (overview)
- 1984; 1988; 1992; 1996; 2000; 2004; 2008; 2012; 2016; 2020; 2024

Tonga competed at the 2004 Summer Olympics in Athens, Greece, from 13 to 29 August 2004.

== Archery ==
One Tongan archer qualified for the men's individual archery through a tripartite invitation.

Athlete	Event	Ranking round		Round of 64	Round of 32	Round of 16	Quarterfinals	Semifinals	Final / BM	
Athlete	Event	Score	Seed	Opposition Score	Opposition Score	Opposition Score	Opposition Score	Opposition Score	Opposition Score	Rank
Sifa Taumoepeau	Men's individual	563	62	Galiazzo (ITA); L 122–156	did not advance					

== Athletics ==
Tongan athletes have so far achieved qualifying standards in the following athletics events (up to a maximum of 3 athletes in each event at the 'A' Standard, and 1 at the 'B' Standard).

Men
Track & road events

Athlete	Event	Heat		Quarterfinal		Semifinal		Final	
Athlete	Event	Result	Rank	Result	Rank	Result	Rank	Result	Rank
Filipo Muller	100 m	11.18	9	did not advance					

Women
Field events

Athlete	Event	Qualification		Final	
Athlete	Event	Distance	Position	Distance	Position
Ana Po'uhila	Shot put	15.33	32	did not advance	

Key

- Note–Ranks given for track events are within the athlete's heat only
- Q = Qualified for the next round
- q = Qualified for the next round as a fastest loser or, in field events, by position without achieving the qualifying target
- NR = National record
- N/A = Round not applicable for the event
- Bye = Athlete not required to compete in round

== Boxing ==
Tonga sent a single boxer to Athens. Ma'afu Hawke lost 11-30 to American Jason Estrada.

Athlete	Event	Round of 16	Quarterfinals	Semifinals	Final	
Athlete	Event	Opposition Result	Opposition Result	Opposition Result	Opposition Result	Rank
Ma'afu Hawke	Super heavyweight	Estrada (USA); L 11–30	did not advance			

== Judo ==
Tonga has qualified a single judoka.

Athlete	Event	Round of 32	Round of 16	Quarterfinals	Semifinals	Repechage 1	Repechage 2	Repechage 3	Final / BM	
Athlete	Event	Opposition Result	Opposition Result	Opposition Result	Opposition Result	Opposition Result	Opposition Result	Opposition Result	Opposition Result	Rank
Akapei Latu	Men's −73 kg	Yagoubi (ALG); L 0000–1111	did not advance							

== See also ==
- Tonga at the 2004 Summer Paralympics
