= Mickey Hughes (boxer) =

English boxer

Personal information
- Nationality: English
- Born: Michael Hughes; 13 June 1962 (age 64) London, England
- Height: 5 ft 9 in (1.75 m)
- Weight: welterweight, and welter/light middleweight

Boxing career
- Stance: Orthodox

Boxing record
- Total fights: 31
- Wins: 24 (KO 21)
- Losses: 7 (KO 4)

Michael "Mickey" Hughes (born 13 June 1962 in London) is a former English boxer. He competed at welterweight and professional welter/light-middleweight boxer levels and was mostly active in the 1980s and 1990s.

As an amateur, he won the 1984 Amateur Boxing Association of England Welterweight title against Robert Thomas at Gloucester Amateur Boxing Club (ABC), boxing out of St. Pancras (ABC). Representing Great Britain as a welterweight in Boxing at the 1984 Summer Olympics in Los Angeles, United States, he defeated Paul Rasamimanana of Madagascar and subsequently lost to Rudel Obreja of Romania.

After turning professional, Mickey won the British Boxing Board of Control (BBB of C) British light-middleweight and Commonwealth light-middleweight titles. He was also a challenger for the BBB of C Southern Area welterweight title against Trevor Smith, Commonwealth welterweight title against Donovan Boucher, BBB of C British welterweight title against Del Bryan, and World Boxing Association (WBA) Inter-Continental light-middleweight title against Shaun Cummins. Mickey's professional fighting weight varied from 146 lb (66 kg; 10 st 6 lb), i.e., welterweight, to 154 lb (70 kg; 11 st 0 lb), i.e., light-middleweight.
