= La Shondra David Mosaʻati =

Tongan sprinter (born 1996)

La Shondra David Mosa'ati
Personal information
- Born: 15 May 1996 (age 30)

Sport
- Country: Tonga
- Sport: Track and field
- Event: 100 metres
- Updated on 29 August 2015

La Shondra David Mosa'ati (born 15 May 1996) is a male Tongan sprinter. He competed in the men's 100 metres event at the 2015 World Championships in Athletics in Beijing, China.

== See also ==
- Tonga at the 2015 World Championships in Athletics
