= Vesa Koskela =

Swedish boxer

Personal information
- Nationality: Swedish
- Born: 22 December 1960 (age 64); Salla, Finland

Sport
- Sport: Boxing

Vesa Koskela (born 22 December 1960) is a Swedish boxer. He competed in the men's welterweight event at the 1984 Summer Olympics.
