= Fine Sani =

Tongan boxer (born 1959)

Fine Sani Vea
Personal information
- Nationality: Tongan
- Born: 19 November 1959 (age 66)

Sport
- Sport: Boxing
Medal record
Men's amateur boxing
Representing Fiji
Commonwealth Games
Gold medal – first place	1982 Brisbane	Light heavyweight

Fine Sani Vea (born 19 November 1959) is a Tongan boxer. He competed in the men's light heavyweight event at the 1984 Summer Olympics, losing his first bout to Georgică Donici of Romania. Sani won a gold medal in the light heavyweight division at the 1982 Commonwealth Games while representing Fiji despite not having Fijian citizenship.

== Honours ==
National honours

- Order of Queen Sālote Tupou III, Member (31 July 2008).

Olympic Games
Preceded by None	Flagbearer for Tonga; Los Angeles 1984	Succeeded by Siololovau Ikavuka
