= Kamel Abboud =

Algerian boxer (born 1961)

Personal information
- Nationality: Algerian
- Born: 30 September 1961 (age 63)
- Height: 1.78 m (5 ft 10 in)
- Weight: 67 kg (148 lb)

Sport
- Sport: Boxing

Kamel Abboud (born 30 September 1961) is an Algerian boxer. He competed in the 1984 Summer Olympics in the men's welterweight division. He tied for ninth place with seven other competitors.

== Early life ==
Kamel trained at the Béjaïa boxing school, considered to be the best at the national level at the time he was training.

== Significant Competitions ==
He won the gold medal in the lightweight division at the 1979 African Boxing Championship.

He competed in the welterweight division at the 1981 CISM Championships held at Camp Lejeune in Jacksonville, North Carolina. He lost to Tim Christensen (USA) in the quarter-finals.
