= Wayne Gordon (boxer) =

Canadian boxer

Wayne Gordon (born March 30, 1963, in Victoria, British Columbia) is a retired boxer from Canada, who competed for his native country at the 1984 Summer Olympics in Los Angeles, California. There he was defeated in the first round of the men's welterweight (– 67 kg) division by eventual American gold medalist Mark Breland. He also represented Canada at the 1983 Pan American Games.

== 1984 Olympic results ==
Below is the record of Wayne Gordon, a Canadian welterweight boxer who competed at the 1984 Los Angeles Olympics:

- Round of 64: lost to Mark Breland (United States) by decision, 0-5
