= Maamaloa Lolohea =

Tongan weightlifter (1968–2020)

Personal information
- Nationality: Tonga
- Born: 27 May 1968 Kolofo'ou, Tonga
- Died: May 21, 2020 (aged 51)
- Height: 1.80 m (5 ft 11 in)
- Weight: 135 kg (298 lb)

Sport
- Sport: Weightlifting
- Event: +100 kg

Maamaloa Lolohea (27 May 1968 – 21 May 2020) was a Tongan weightlifter. At age forty, Lolohea made his official debut for the 2008 Summer Olympics in Beijing, where he competed in the men's super heavyweight category (+105 kg). Lolohea placed thirteenth in this event, as he successfully lifted 140 kg in the single-motion snatch, and hoisted 173 kg in the two-part, shoulder-to-overhead clean and jerk, for a total of 313 kg.

== Major results ==
Year	Venue	Weight	Snatch (kg)				Clean & Jerk (kg)				Total	Rank
Year	Venue	Weight	1	2	3	Rank	1	2	3	Rank	Total	Rank
Representing Tonga
Olympic Games
2008	Beijing, China	+105 kg	127	135	140	13	173	~~185~~	~~185~~	13	313	13
Commonwealth Games
2006	Melbourne, Australia	+105 kg	135	~~140~~	~~140~~	4	175	177	~~190~~	4	312	4
2002	(United Kingdom) Manchester, Great Britain	+105 kg	125.0	~~130.0~~	130.0	6	160.0	170.0	~~177.5~~	6	300.0	6
