= Rudel Obreja =

Romanian boxer (1965–2023)

Personal information
- Full name: Rudel Ionel Obreja
- Nationality: Romanian
- Born: 6 August 1965 Galați, Romania
- Died: 12 March 2023 (aged 57) Bucharest, Romania
- Height: 174 cm (5 ft 9 in)

Sport
- Sport: Boxing
Medal record
Men's amateur boxing
Representing Romania
Romania National Amateur Boxing Championships
Gold medal – first place	1984 Bucharest	Welterweight
Gold medal – first place	1987 Bucharest	Light middleweight
Gold medal – first place	1988 Constanța	Light middleweight
Gold medal – first place	1989 Bucharest	Light middleweight
World Amateur Championships
Bronze medal – third place	1989 Moscow	Light middleweight
European Amateur Championships
Silver medal – second place	1989 Athens	Light middleweight

Rudel Obreja (6 August 1965 – 12 March 2023) was a Romanian boxer and businessman. He competed in the men's welterweight event at the 1984 Summer Olympics. Obreja also won four national senior titles, a bronze medal at the 1989 World Amateur Boxing Championships and a silver medal at the European Amateur Boxing Championships. He was the president of the Romanian Boxing Federation between 2004 and 2012. In 2007, he was elected vice president of AIBA, and was the chief technical officer for amateur boxing at the 2008 Summer Olympics in Beijing.

In 2018, Obreja was sentenced to 5 years in prison for money laundering, tax evasion and bribery. In 2022, he was released to undergo cancer treatment in a non-prison hospital. He died on 12 March 2023, at age 57.
