= Siololovau Ikavuka =

Tongan athlete

Personal information
- Nationality: Tongan
- Born: 8 February 1968 (age 58)

Sport
- Sport: Athletics
- Events: Shot put Discus

Siololovau Ikavuka (born 8 February 1968) is a Tongan athlete. She competed in the women's shot put and the women's discus throw at the 1988 Summer Olympics. She was the first woman to represent Tonga at the Olympics.

Olympic Games
Preceded by Fine Sani	Flagbearer for Tonga; Seoul 1988	Succeeded by Paea Wolfgramm
