= Tevita Kofe Ngalu =

Tongan weightlifter

Personal information
- Nationality: Tonga
- Born: 30 April 1973 (age 53) Tonga
- Height: 1.77 m (5 ft 9 1/2 in)
- Weight: 105 kg (231 lb)

Sport
- Sport: Weightlifting
- Event: +105 kg

Tevita Kofe Ngalu (born 30 April 1973) is a Tongan weightlifter who competed at the 2000 Summer Olympics.

Ngalu's was 27 years old when he competed in his first major international event which was the 2000 Summer Olympics which was held in Sydney, he entered the 105 kg contest, and after lifting 127.5 kg in the snatch and 167 kg in the clean and jerk he finished in 13th place out of the 21 starters.

Ngalu won at the 2013 New Zealand Weightlifting Championships held in Christchurch in the over 105 kg division.
