= Peter Okumu =

Ugandan boxer

Personal information
- Nationality: Ugandan
- Born: 9 October 1962 (age 62)

Sport
- Sport: Boxing

Peter Okumu (born 9 October 1962) is a Ugandan boxer. He competed in the men's welterweight event at the 1984 Summer Olympics.
