= Dwight Frazer =

Jamaican boxer (born 1967)

Personal information
- Nationality: Jamaican
- Born: 22 December 1967 (age 57)

Sport
- Sport: Boxing

Dwight Frazer (born 22 December 1967) is a Jamaican boxer. He competed in the men's welterweight event at the 1984 Summer Olympics.
