= Alexander Künzler =

German boxer

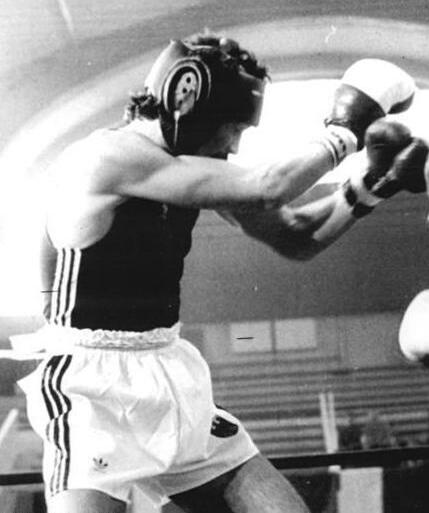
- Künzler in 1986

Personal information
- Nationality: German
- Born: 11 July 1962 (age 62); Pforzheim, West Germany

Sport
- Sport: Boxing

Alexander Künzler (born 11 July 1962) is a German former boxer. He competed at the 1984 Summer Olympics and the 1988 Summer Olympics.
