= Maleselo Fukofuka =

Tongan sprinter (born 2005)

Personal information
- Nationality: Tonga
- Born: 10 June 2005 (age 21) Tatakamotonga, Tongatapu

Sport
- Country: Tonga
- Sport: Athletics
- Event: 100 m

Achievements and titles
- Personal best: 12.11s (100 m)

Maleselo Fukofuka (born 10 June 2005) is a Tongan sprinter. He competed for Tonga in the men's 100 metres at the 2024 Summer Olympics.

== Career ==
Fukofuka represented Tonga in the decathlon event at the 2023 Pacific Games. He also competed in the decathlon event in the 2024 Oceania Athletics Championships, where he ran a time of 12.57 seconds in the 100 metres.

He represented Tonga in the men's 100 metres at the 2024 Summer Olympics in Paris. He ran a personal best time of 12.11 seconds in Heat 5 of the preliminary round, he finished in eighth place and did not progress to the next round. The winner of the heat was Christopher Borzor of Haiti.
