= Pita Taufatofua =

Tongan taekwondo practitioner and skier

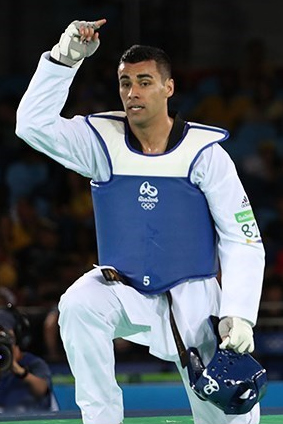
- Taufatofua at the 2016 Summer Olympics

Personal information
- Full name: Pita Nikolas Taufatofua
- Nicknames: Tonga Flag Bearer
- National team: Tonga
- Citizenship: Tongan
- Born: 5 November 1983 (age 43) Brisbane, Queensland, Australia
- Education: Tonga Side School; Tonga High School; Saint Peter's Lutheran College
- Height: 1.92 m (6 ft 4 in)
- Weight: 100 kg (220 lb)

Sport
- Sport: Taekwondo; Cross-country skiing Canoe
- Coached by: Vasini Piu; Paul Sitapa (Both for Taekwondo)
Medal record
Men's taekwondo
Representing Tonga
Oceania Taekwondo Olympic Qualification Tournament
Gold medal – first place	2016 Port Moresby	+80 kg
Gold medal – first place	2020 Gold Coast	+80 kg
Silver medal – second place	2011 Nouméa	+80 kg

Pita Nikolas Taufatofua (born 5 November 1983) is a Tongan athlete in taekwondo, cross-country skiing, and canoe. He is also a UNICEF ambassador and motivational speaker and lives in Brisbane, Australia.

Taufatofua became internationally famous after appearing in a traditional Tongan taʻovala wrapped around his waist, with his chest bared and oiled, as Tonga's flagbearer in the 2016 Summer Olympics opening ceremony in Rio de Janeiro, Brazil. He went on to reprise his role as flagbearer for the 2018 Winter Olympics and the 2020 Summer Olympics.

== Early life ==
Taufatofua was born in Australia on 5 November 1983 and raised in Tonga. He attended Tonga Side School and Tonga High School, and graduated from Saint Peter's Lutheran College in Brisbane in 2000. His Tongan father, Dr Pita Faiva Taufatofua, would later be appointed as governor of Haʻapai in 2021; his mother is Australian of British descent. He began practicing taekwondo at age five.

His childhood included traditional Tongan activities such as harvesting cassava.

== Sports career ==
=== Taekwondo career ===
In the course of his career he has experienced, by one account, "six broken bones, three torn ligaments, three months in a wheelchair, a year and a half on crutches and hundreds of hours of physiotherapy".

At the 2016 Oceania Taekwondo Olympic Qualification Tournament in February in Port Moresby, Papua New Guinea, he won his semi-final 4–3 before winning in the final against the 15th ranked fighter in the world to qualify for the 2016 Olympics. He had previously tried to qualify for the Olympics on two occasions. He was the first athlete from Tonga to compete in the Olympics in taekwondo. He was Tonga's flagbearer for the opening ceremony.

Taufatofua did not qualify for the 2024 Summer Olympics in either taekwondo or kayak.

=== Cross-country skiing career ===
In December 2016, Taufatofua posted a video announcing his plans to train and compete in cross-country skiing. He began learning form and technique by watching YouTube videos of professional races. In January 2018, the Wall Street Journal reported he was one race away from qualifying for the 2018 Winter Olympics in PyeongChang, having completed most of his qualification requirements in roller ski races and only needing to make a final qualifying time on snow. Taufatofua joined forces with skiers German Madrazo of Mexico and Yonathan Fernandez of Chile to form an independent training group that rented a cabin in Austria to train on snow and travel together to races. After slow finishes in seven snow races throughout January 2018, Taufatofua's last opportunity was a race on 20 January in Ísafjörður, Iceland. Taufatofua, Madrazo, and Fernandez almost missed the race due to road closures from snowstorms and an avalanche, but ultimately Taufatofua succeeded in qualifying for the 2018 Winter Olympics in the Iceland race on the final day of the qualification period. He is the second Tongan to compete in the Winter Olympics, after 2014 luger Bruno Banani.

=== Canoeing career ===
In April 2019, it was reported Taufatofua would attempt to qualify for the 2020 Summer Olympics, this time in sprint canoeing. He told the BBC, "It's a sport that's close to my heart as it's what my ancestors did for thousands of years when they colonised the Polynesian islands." Taufatofua hoped to qualify for the one-man (K-1) 200-metre kayak event.

At the World Canoe Sprint Championships in Hungary in August 2019, Taufatofua finished last in his opening round heat. In order to qualify for the 2021 Olympics, he would have had to win the K-1 200-metre event at the Oceania continental qualifier in February 2020. That attempt was unsuccessful.

However, in February 2020, he qualified for the 2020 Summer Olympics for taekwondo, after winning gold in the M+80 kg, his second Olympic competition for the sport.

=== Olympic appearances ===
==== 2016 Summer Olympics ====
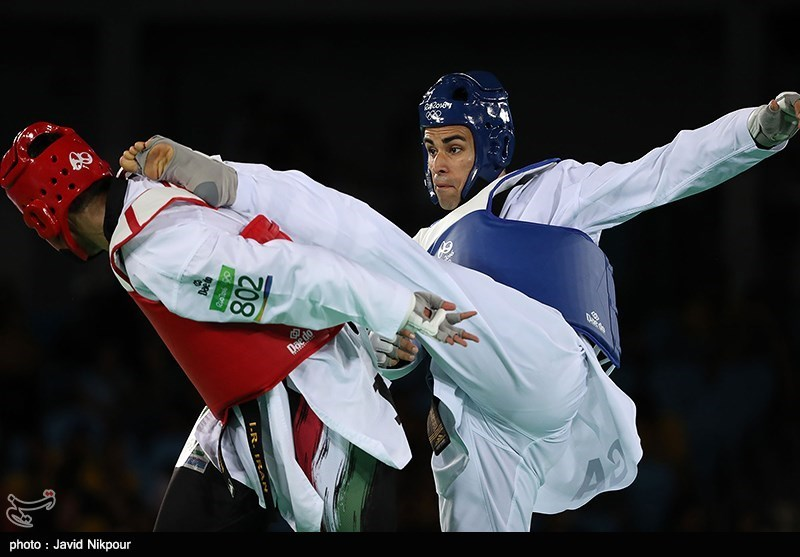
Taufatofua sparring with Sajjad Mardani in his first bout

Taufatofua appeared as Tonga's flag bearer in the Parade of Nations during the Olympics opening ceremony, which was held on 5 August 2016 in Rio de Janeiro, Brazil. During the parade, he wore nothing but a taʻovala (a Tongan mat which is wrapped around the waist), with his face and torso appearing noticeably shiny. Initially, many assumed that he was sweating profusely, but it became apparent that he had applied copious amounts of oil to his torso. Taufatofua's shirtless, oiled-up appearance garnered him fame on social media as footage of his appearance went viral.

During the taekwondo tournament, Taufatofua was eliminated in his first bout by the Iranian Sajjad Mardani once the score escalated to 16–1. Taufatofua made an appearance at the closing ceremony of the games, showing up after a musical number in the same costume he wore during the Parade of Nations.

==== 2018 Winter Olympics ====
As Tonga's only representative in the 2018 Winter Olympics, Taufatofua was again the flagbearer for his country in the 2018 Winter Olympics Parade of Nations. Despite the temperatures being below freezing—and telling the media before the ceremony that he would not walk shirtless—he again wore nothing but a traditional Taʻovala mat wrapped around his waist, baring an oiled chest and torso.

On Friday 16 February 2018, he competed in the 15km skiing freestyle race, coming in 114th place out of 119 skiers.

==== 2020 Summer Olympics ====
Taufatofua led his nation in the 2020 Opening Ceremonies, again shirtless and oiled; however, this time he had a co-flagbearer, Malia Paseka, who was also there to compete in Taekwondo. This marked the third time the Tongan Olympian carried his country's flag in tapa cloth (a form of traditional Tongan clothing). In addition to showing off his oiled physique, Taufatofua also wore a pearl necklace in tribute to those who had recently passed (namely as a result of the COVID-19 pandemic) as well as in dedication to his parents and family. The black pearl featured on the necklace held personal significance to him and his family. Prior to the opening ceremonies, Taufatofua shared a photograph of the necklace on Instagram, beginning the caption with the words, "FOR THOSE WE LOST - you will always be a pearl in the safety of our hearts."

==== 2026 Winter Olympics ====
During the 2026 Winter Olympics opening ceremony, Pita Taufatofua appeared as one of the eight carriers of the Olympic flag.

== Personal life ==
Taufatofua grew up with his parents and six siblings in a one-bedroom house in Tonga, which the family lost in a tropical storm. As an adult he splits his time between his home nation and Brisbane, Australia.

Taufatofua is a UNICEF ambassador and spends time working with homelessness charities, including at Sandgate House training homeless children to develop independent living skills. He also works to raise awareness of global warming, which threatens his island nation of Tonga.

Taufatofua is a motivational speaker and in 2018 he published a book called The Motivation Station: An Essential Guide to Becoming Your Greatest Version. He was a speaker at the 2018 MIT Solve, which was headlined by Canadian Prime Minister Justin Trudeau.

Taufatofua has an engineering degree and as of 2016 is working on his master's degree. He has also worked as a model beginning at age eighteen.

In 2022, Taufatofua reported on Instagram that his father and other family members were among those affected by the 2022 Hunga Tonga–Hunga Ha'apai eruption and tsunami. He also made a fundraiser on the website GoFundMe, to provide money for relief to Tonga following the tsunami.
