= Malia Paseka (taekwondo) =

Tongan taekwondo practitioner

Personal information
- Full name: Malia Maile Paseka
- National team: Tonga
- Born: 30 August 2000 (age 26)
- Years active: 2012–present

Sport
- Sport: Taekwondo
- Weight class: -62kg, -67kg

Malia Maile Paseka (born 30 August 2000) is a Tongan Taekwondo athlete who made her Olympic debut at the 2020 Summer Olympics in Tokyo. She was an opening ceremony flag bearer alongside Pita Taufatofua.

== Sports career ==
Paseka started fighting taekwondo at the age of 11, after being invited by her brother. In 2019, Paseka won bronze in the women's -62 kg and gold in the team event at the Pacific Games in Apia, Samoa, the first step in her path towards Olympic qualification.

=== 2020 Summer Olympics ===
In February 2020, Paseka secured her spot in the Olympics after winning gold in the women's 67 kg division at the Olympic Qualifier tournament on Australia's Gold Coast. Her appearance at the 2020 Summer Olympics marked the first time a female Taekwondo athlete represented Tonga at the Olympic Games. She also became the ninth female athlete to represent Tonga in any sport at the Olympic Games. Paseka lost in her debut by a technical knockout, after Lauren Williams kicked her in the head and the referees stopped the contest. Williams' final entry sent Paseka to the repechage, where she lost to Hedaya Wahba.
