= Vedat Önsoy =

Turkish boxer

Personal information
- Nationality: Turkish
- Born: 7 July 1959 (age 65)

Sport
- Sport: Boxing

Vedat Önsoy (born 7 July 1959) is a Turkish boxer. He competed in the men's welterweight event at the 1984 Summer Olympics.
