= Joseph Andy Lui =

Tongan sprinter

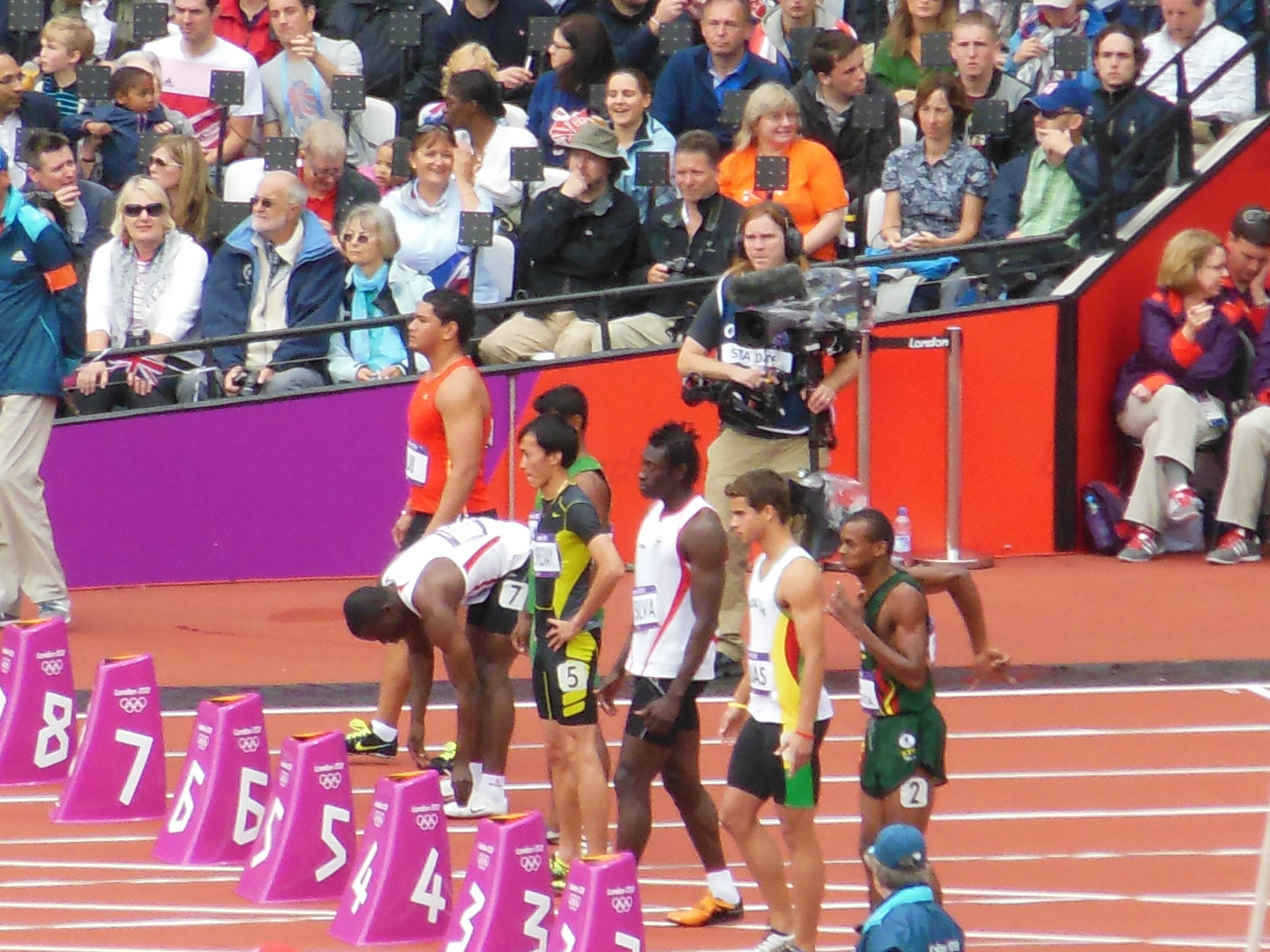
- Before the start of heat 1 of the 100 m at the 2012 Summer Olympics

Personal information
- Born: January 7, 1992 (age 34) Tofoa

Sport
- Country: Tonga
- Sport: Athletics
- Event: 100 metres
- Updated on 7 August 2012

Joseph Andy Lui (born January 7, 1992) is a sprinter from Tonga. He came 4th in Heat 1 of the 100 metres Preliminaries at the 2012 Summer Olympics.

Lui was born in Tofoa.
