= Ana Siulolo Liku =

Tongan hurdler

Personal information
- Nationality: Tongan
- Born: 9 January 1974 (age 52)
- Spouse: Toluta'u Koula Sr.
- Relatives: Toluta'u Koula (son)

Sport
- Sport: Track and field
- Events: Long Jump; 100 metres hurdles

Ana Siulolo Liku (born 9 January 1974) is a Tongan long jumper and hurdler. She competed in the Women's long jump at the US 1996 Summer Olympics in Atlanta, and in the Women's 100 metres hurdles at the Australian 2000 Summer Olympics in Sydney. She was also given the honour of being the Tongan flag bearer in Sydney.

== Family ==
Now living in Sydney, Ana Siulolo Liku is the wife of former Tongan sprinter Toluta'u Koula Sr., and the mother of current (2025) Manly Warringah Sea Eagles and Tongan international representative rugby league player Toluta'u Koula Jr. (born 2 September 2002). Like his parents, Tolu Jr. was a sprinter in his youth. In 2019 at age 17 he set the still standing (as of 2025) New South Wales GPS (Great Public Schools) 100m record with a time of 10.58, only 0.02 slower than his father's personal best 100m time set in 1996.

== Honours ==
National honours

- Order of Queen Sālote Tupou III, Member (31 July 2008).
