= Paea Wolfgramm =

Tongan boxer (born 1969)

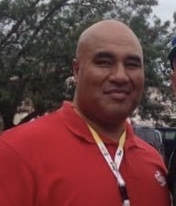
- Wolfgramm in 2017

Personal information
- Full name: Paea Wolfgramm
- Nickname: The Tongan Warrior
- Nationality: Tongan
- Born: December 1, 1969 (age 56) Vava'u, Tonga
- Height: 1.85 m (6 ft 1 in)
- Weight: 140 kg (309 lb)

Sport
- Sport: Boxing
- Weight class: Super Heavyweight
Medal record
Men's amateur boxing
Representing Tonga
Olympic Games
| Silver medal – second place | 1996 Atlanta | Super heavyweight |
Commonwealth Games
| Bronze medal – third place | 1994 Victoria | Super heavyweight |

Paea Wolfgramm (born December 1, 1969) is a Tongan retired boxer. Nicknamed "The Tongan Warrior", Wolfgramm earned the Super Heavyweight silver medal at the 1996 Summer Olympics, making him the first and only athlete from Tonga to win an Olympic medal.

== Personal ==
Wolfgramm has 7 children - 5 boys and 2 girls, as well as 4 brothers and 2 sisters. He resides in South Auckland New Zealand and now works as an architect.

== Amateur highlights ==
- 1994 3rd place at the Commonwealth Games in Victoria, Canada.
  - Defeated Joseph Saimei (Solomon Islands) RSC 2
  - Lost to David Anyim (Kenya) PTS (5–9)
- 1995 won the Oceanian Championships in Nuku'alofa, Tonga.
- 1996 Representing Tonga, Wolfgramm won the Super Heavyweight Silver Medal at the Atlanta Olympics. Results were:
  - Defeated Serguei Lyakhovich (Belarus) PTS (10–9)
  - Defeated Alexis Rubalcaba (Cuba) PTS (17–12)
  - Defeated Duncan Dokiwari (Nigeria) PTS (7–6)
  - Lost to Wladimir Klitschko (Ukraine) PTS (3–7)

== Professional career ==
At 6'4" and 325 pounds, the huge Wolfgramm turned pro after the Olympics, but had limited success. He lost a decision to journeyman Marion Wilson in 1998. Although he was able to beat former Cuban Olympian Jorge Luis Gonzalez by decision to set up a fight with Wladimir Klitschko for the vacant WBC International Heavyweight Title, he was beaten in the first round in a rematch of their 1996 Super Heavyweight Olympic finals bout. He later lost a decision to Eliecer Castillo, but beat Jimmy Thunder to set up a fight with Corey Sanders in late 2001. Sanders won via 9th-round TKO, and Wolfgramm announced his retirement shortly after this fight.

== Professional boxing record ==
| 24 fights | 20 wins | 4 losses |
|---|---|---|
| By knockout | 14 | 2 |
| By decision | 6 | 2 |

| No. | Result | Record | Opponent | Type | Round, time | Date | Location | Notes |
|---|---|---|---|---|---|---|---|---|
| 24 | Loss | 20–4 | (United States) Corey Sanders | TKO | 9 (10), 1:54 | 8 Aug 2001 | (United States) Grand Victoria Casino, Elgin, Illinois, U.S. | |
| 23 | Win | 20–3 | (New Zealand) Jimmy Thunder | TD | 7 (10), 3:00 | 1 Apr 2001 | (United States) Hard Rock Hotel and Casino, Las Vegas, Nevada, U.S. | |
| 22 | Loss | 19–3 | (Cuba) Eliecer Castillo | SD | 12 | 21 Oct 2000 | (United States) Silver Star Casino, Philadelphia, Mississippi, U.S. | For vacant IBO Inter-Continental heavyweight title |
| 21 | Win | 19–2 | (United States) Rocky Gannon | RTD | 3 (8), 3:00 | 21 Jul 2000 | (United States) Regent Hotel and Casino, Las Vegas, Nevada, U.S. | |
| 20 | Loss | 18–2 | (Ukraine) Wladimir Klitschko | TKO | 1 (12), 1:30 | 18 Mar 2000 | Sporthalle, Hamburg, Germany | For vacant WBC International heavyweight title |
| 19 | Win | 18–1 | (United States) Calvin Lampkin | UD | 10 | 5 Dec 1999 | (United States) Casino Magic, Bay St. Louis, Mississippi, U.S. | |
| 18 | Win | 17–1 | (United States) Gerard Jones | UD | 10 | 7 Mar 1999 | (United States) Celebrity Theatre, Phoenix, Arizona, U.S. | |
| 17 | Win | 16–1 | (Cuba) Jorge Luis González | MD | 8 | 15 Aug 1998 | (United States) County Coliseum, El Paso, Texas, U.S. | |
| 16 | Win | 15–1 | (United States) Guy Sonnenberg | TKO | 1 (8), 1:29 | 12 Jun 1998 | (United States) Belle of Baton Rouge Casino, Baton Rouge, Louisiana, U.S. | |
| 15 | Loss | 14–1 | (United States) Marion Wilson | MD | 6 | 9 May 1998 | (United States) Trump Taj Mahal, Atlantic City, New Jersey, U.S. | |
| 14 | Win | 14–0 | (United States) Rick Sullivan | TKO | 1 (6) | 21 Mar 1998 | Max-Schmeling-Halle, Berlin, Germany | |
| 13 | Win | 13–0 | (United States) Kevin Rosier | TKO | 1 (6), 1:12 | 16 Jan 1998 | (United States) Trump Casino Hotel, Atlantic City, New Jersey, U.S. | |
| 12 | Win | 12–0 | (United States) Billy Eaton | KO | 1 (6), 1:29 | 20 Dec 1997 | (United States) Country Club, Reseda, California, U.S. | |
| 11 | Win | 11–0 | (United States) Ed White | KO | 1 (4), 2:15 | 23 Sep 1997 | (United States) Foxwoods Resort, Mashantucket, Connecticut, U.S. | |
| 10 | Win | 10–0 | (United States) Gerald Brown | TKO | 1 (4) | 23 August 1997 | (United States) Wild Wild West, Atlantic City, New Jersey, U.S. | |
| 9 | Win | 9–0 | (United States) Jessie Henry | TKO | 3 (4), 2:59 | 9 August 1997 | (United States) South Padre Island, Texas, U.S. | |
| 8 | Win | 8–0 | (United States) Robert Mitchell | TKO | 1 (4) | 24 May 1997 | (United States) Mammoth Events Center, Denver, Colorado, U.S. | |
| 7 | Win | 7–0 | (Armenia) Khoren Indjian | TKO | 2 (4), 1:24 | 10 May 1997 | (United States) MARK of the Quad Cities, Moline, Illinois, U.S. | |
| 6 | Win | 6–0 | (United States) Ronnie Smith | UD | 4 | 3 Mar 1997 | (United States) Austin, Texas, U.S. | |
| 5 | Win | 5–0 | (United States) Stan Jones | KO | 2 (6) | 14 Feb 1997 | (United States) Fantasy Springs Casino, Indio, California, U.S. | |
| 4 | Win | 4–0 | (United States) Momtchil Govedarov | TKO | 1 (4), 1:17 | 28 Jan 1997 | (United States) Club Rio, Tempe, Arizona, U.S. | |
| 3 | Win | 3–0 | (United States) Orlando Leavall | PTS | 4 | 17 Jan 1997 | (United States) Country Club, Reseda, California, U.S. | |
| 2 | Win | 2–0 | (United States) John Foster | TKO | 1 (4) | 11 Jan 1997 | (United States) Hynes Convention Center, Boston, Massachusetts, U.S. | |
| 1 | Win | 1–0 | (United States) Jeff Kirk | KO | 1 (4), 0:46 | 3 Dec 1996 | (United States) Fantasy Springs Casino, Indio, California, U.S. | Professional debut |

== Honours ==
National honours

- Order of Queen Sālote Tupou III, Member (31 July 2008).

Olympic Games
| Preceded by Siololovau Ikavuka | Flagbearer for Tonga; Atlanta 1996 | Succeeded by Ana Siulolo Liku |
