= Aisea Tohi =

Tongan sprinter (born 1987)

Personal information
- Nationality: Tonga
- Born: April 15, 1987 (age 39) Tofoa, Tonga
- Height: 1.85 m (6 ft 1 in)
- Weight: 68 kg (150 lb)

Sport
- Sport: Athletics
Medal record
Men's athletics
Representing Tonga
Oceania Championships
Bronze medal – third place	2006 Apia	800 m medley relay (Mixed)
- Updated on 22 April 2013

Aisea Tohi (born April 15, 1987) is a track and field sprint athlete who competes internationally for Tonga.

Tohi represented Tonga at the 2008 Summer Olympics in Beijing. He competed at the 100 metres sprint and placed 7th in his heat without advancing to the second round. He ran the distance in a time of 11.17 seconds.

He also took part in 2007 and 2009 World Championships in Athletics in Osaka and Berlin respectively.

His personal best at the 100 meters sprint is 11.05 seconds, that he achieved on September 24th, 2009 in Cook Islands.

== Achievements ==
Year	Competition	Venue	Position	Event	Notes
Representing Tonga
2004	Oceania Championships	Townsville, Australia	3rd (exhibition)	4 × 100 m relay	43.84 s
2006	Oceania Championships	Apia, Samoa	3rd	Mixed 800 m medley relay	1:38.06 min
