= Ronald Fotofili =

Tongan sprinter

Ronald Lawrence Fotofili
Personal information
- Nationality: Tongan
- Born: 6 July 1998 (age 27)

Sport
- Sport: Athletics
- Event: Sprinting

Achievements and titles
- Personal bests: 100 m: 10.89 (2019); 200 m: 21.54 (2019) NR; 400 m: 49.62 (2017)

Ronald Lawrence Fotofili (born 6 July 1998) is a Tongan athlete. He competed in the men's 100 metres event at the 2019 World Athletics Championships, where he was eliminated in the preliminary round. He also competed in the men's 100 metres event at the 2020 Summer Olympics, where he suffered the result. He was a batonbearer for the 2022 Commonwealth Games Queen's Baton Relay when the baton came to Tonga in February 2022.

Fotofili is from the village of Lapaha and attended Tupou College, where he began competing in athletics.
