= Kieran Joyce (boxer) =

Irish boxer

Personal information
- Nationality: Irish
- Born: 9 October 1964 (age 60)

Sport
- Sport: Boxing

Kieran Joyce (born 9 October 1964) is an Irish boxer. He competed at the 1984 Summer Olympics and the 1988 Summer Olympics.
