= Toluta'u Koula (sprinter) =

Tongan sprinter

Toluta'u Koula (born 6 July 1970) is a former Tongan sprinter who competed in the men's 100m competition at the 1996 Summer Olympics. He recorded a 10.71, not enough to qualify for the next round past the heats. He also competed in the 1992 Summer Olympics, scoring a 10.85, as well as the 2000 Summer Olympics, where he ran an 11.01. His personal best is 10.56, set in 1996. He also competed in the 1994 and 1998 Commonwealth Games.

== Personal life ==
Living in Sydney, Toluta'u Koula Sr is married to Tongan Knight and former Tongan hurdles sprinter, Ana Siulolo Liku. Together they are the parents of Manly Warringah Sea Eagles outside back Toluta'u Koula Jr. Like his father, in his youth Tolu Jr. was a sprinter who since 2019 has held the New South Wales GPS (Great Public Schools) 100m record with a time of 10.58, only 0.02 slower than his father’s best recorded time.
