= Tonga National Paralympic Committee =

National Paralympic Committee of Tonga

National Paralympic Committee
- Country: Tonga
- Code: TGA
- Continental association: OPC
- Headquarters: Tonga Red Cross Bldg, Upper Room Taufa'ahau Road, Nukuʻalofa, Tonga
- President: Dr Nailasikau Halatuituia

Tonga National Paralympic Committee (IPC code: TGA) is the National Paralympic Committee representing Tonga.
