= Tonga Sports Association and National Olympic Committee =

National Olympic Committee

- Country: Tonga
- Code: TGA
- Created: 1963
- Recognized: 1984
- Continental Association: ONOC
- President: Michael Bloomfield
- Secretary General: Siosifa Takitoa Taumoepeau
- Website: www.tasanoc.com

The Tonga Sports Association and National Olympic Committee (IOC code: TGA) is the National Olympic Committee representing Tonga.

== See also ==
- Tonga at the Olympics
- Tonga at the Commonwealth Games
