= Athletics at the 1995 South Pacific Games =

Athletics at the X South Pacific Games
- Dates: August 17–24
- Host city: Pirae, Tahiti (French Polynesia) / (French Polynesia)
- Venue: Stade Pater Te Hono Nui
- Level: Senior
- Events: 42 (23 men, 19 women)
- Participation: 12 nations

Athletics competitions at the 1995 South Pacific Games were held at the Stade Pater Te Hono Nui in Pirae, French Polynesia, between August 17–24, 1995.

A total of 42 events were contested, 23 by men and 19 by women.

== Medal summary ==
Medal winners and their results were published on the Athletics Weekly webpage courtesy of Tony Isaacs and Børre Lilloe, and on the Oceania Athletics Association webpage by Bob Snow.

Complete results can also be found on the Oceania Athletics Association and on the Athletics PNG webpages, both also compiled by Bob Snow.

=== Men ===
Event	Gold		Silver		Bronze	
100 metres (wind: 0.0 m/s)	Jone Delai (FIJ)	10.34 GR	Peter Pulu (PNG)	10.54	Amos Ali (PNG)	10.79
200 metres (wind: +2.9 m/s)	Jone Delai (FIJ)	21.20 w	Peter Pulu (PNG)	21.47 w	Amos Ali (PNG)	21.74 w
400 metres	Ivan Wakit (PNG)	47.77	Subul Babo (PNG)	47.80	Henry Rogo (FIJ)	48.39
800 metres	Isireli Naikelekelevesi (FIJ)	1:52.49 GR	Peteresio Ranuku (FIJ)	1:52.76	Tawai Keiruan (VAN)	1:52.91
1500 metres	Isireli Naikelekelevesi (FIJ)	3:58.58	Tawai Keiruan (VAN)	3:58.63	Peteresio Ranuku (FIJ)	3:59.54
5000 metres	(French Polynesia) /Georges Richmond (TAH)	15:18.85	Christian Cacot (NCL)	15:35.07	Sau Wai (PNG)	15:37.54
10000 metres	(French Polynesia) /Georges Richmond (TAH)	32:32.82	Davendra Singh (FIJ)	32:37.86	Sau Wai (PNG)	32:46.44
Marathon	(French Polynesia) /Georges Richmond (TAH)	2:30:32	Binesh Prasad (FIJ)	2:34:01	Mahendra Prasad (FIJ)	2:45:22
3000 metres steeplechase	Tawai Keiruan (VAN)	9:21.11	Davendra Singh (FIJ)	9:23.28	Primo Higa (SOL)	9:36.53
110 metres hurdles (wind: +2.7 m/s)	Ivan Wakit (PNG)	14.97 w	Albert Chambonnier (NCL)	15.20 w	(French Polynesia) /Yohann Bouit (TAH)	15.58 w
400 metres hurdles	Ivan Wakit (PNG)	52.20 GR	Henry Rogo (FIJ)	54.04	Autiko Daunakamakama (FIJ)	54.48
High jump	Jean-Bernard Fuller (NCL)	2.01	(French Polynesia) /Moana Laurendeau (TAH)	1.98	Aisea Tukutau (TGA)	1.88
Pole vault	(French Polynesia) /Thibaut Cattiau (TAH)	4.60	Yoan Tein-Bai (NCL)	4.50	Aisea Tukutau (TGA)	4.40
Long jump	(French Polynesia) /Apolosi Foliaki (TAH)	7.39 (wind: +0.7 m/s) =GR	Gabriele Qoro (FIJ)	7.21 (wind: +0.9 m/s)	Tevita Fauonuku (TGA)	7.13 (wind: +0.8 m/s)
Triple jump	Michel Louison (NCL)	15.29 w (wind: +3.0 m/s)	(French Polynesia) /Apolosi Foliaki (TAH)	14.78 w (wind: +5.1 m/s)	Steeve Druminy (NCL)	14.57 w (wind: +5.1 m/s)
Shot put	Rocky Vaitanaki (NCL)	17.74	Jean-Pierre Totélé (NCL)	16.36	Yannick Fakaté (NCL)	16.14
Discus throw	Jean-Pierre Totélé (NCL)	52.38 GR	(French Polynesia) /Gordon Barff (TAH)	52.22	Laurent Pakihivatau (NCL)	48.38
Hammer throw	Laurent Pakihivatau (NCL)	61.78 GR	Yannick Fakaté (NCL)	54.50	Brentt Jones (NFK)	54.00
Javelin throw	(Wallis and Futuna) /Lolohea Halagahu (WLF)	73.34	Gaëtan Siakinuu-Schmidt (NCL)	72.22	(Wallis and Futuna) /Vitolio Tipotio (WLF)	71.32
Decathlon	Joseph Rodan II (FIJ)	6287	Albert Miller (FIJ)	6179	(Wallis and Futuna) /Setefano Initia (WLF)	5279
20 Kilometres Road Walk	Dip Chand (FIJ)	1:49:56 GR	Pradeep Chand (FIJ)	1:51:04	Caleb Maybir (FIJ)	1:52:36
4 x 100 metres relay	Papua New Guinea; Allan Akia; Peter Pulu; Amos Ali; Subul Babo	40.29 GR	Fiji; Gabriel Qoro; Jone Delai; Solomone Bole; Henry Rogo	40.52	Vanuatu; Franckie Mariello; Jansen Molisingi; Baptiste Firiam; Laurence Jack	41.26
4 x 400 metres relay	Fiji; Henry Rogo; Solomone Bole; Soloveni Nakaunicina; Jone Delai	3:10.16	Papua New Guinea; Subul Babo; Samuel Bai; Peter Pulu; Ivan Wakit	3:10.52	Vanuatu; Tavakalo Kailes; Jean-Pierre Tiopang; Tawai Keiruan; Baptiste Firiam	3:16.09

=== Women ===
Event	Gold		Silver		Bronze	
100 metres (wind: 0.0 m/s)	Vaciseva Tavaga (FIJ)	12.03	Rachel Rogers (FIJ)	12.21	Laure Uedre (NCL)	12.45
200 metres (wind: +1.2 m/s)	Vaciseva Tavaga (FIJ)	24.45 GR	Mary Estelle Kapalu (VAN)	24.85	Rachel Rogers (FIJ)	24.95
400 metres	Mary Estelle Kapalu (VAN)	54.69 GR	Vaciseva Tavaga (FIJ)	55.98	Kelera Tania (FIJ)	57.63
800 metres	Salome Tabuatalei (FIJ)	2:11.12 GR	Karolina Tanono (FIJ)	2:12.42	Mary Estelle Kapalu (VAN)	2:13.69
1500 metres	Nadia Prasad (NCL)	4:29.3 GR	Salome Tabuatalei (FIJ)	4:54.2	Vasa Tulahe (TGA)	4:55.2
3000 metres	Nadia Prasad (NCL)	9:09.48 GR	Salome Tabuatalei (FIJ)	10:26.11	Rosemary Omundsen (PNG)	10:29.99
10000 metres	Nadia Prasad (NCL)	33:47.21 GR	Rosemary Omundsen (PNG)	38:11.37	(French Polynesia) /Teroro Meyer (TAH)	41:30.72
Marathon	Pauline Vea (TGA)	2:54:02 GR	Marie-José Berthet (NCL)	3:11:02	Marie Benito (GUM)	3:16:44
100 metres hurdles (wind: -0.5 m/s)	Rachel Rogers (FIJ)	13.96 GR	(French Polynesia) /Gaëlle Arbus de la Palme (TAH)	14.90	Seraseini Likuwaqa (FIJ)	16.79
400 metres hurdles	Mary Estelle Kapalu (VAN)	59.65 GR	Asenaca Shaw (FIJ)	64.84	(French Polynesia) /Christine Coquil (TAH)	70.56
High jump	Mereani White (FIJ)	1.70	Angela Way (PNG)	1.67	Sainiana Rokolewetini (FIJ)	1.59
Long jump	Siulolo Liku (TGA)	5.75 w (wind: +4.3 m/s)	Marica Likulawedua (FIJ)	5.67 w (wind: +6.3 m/s)	Angela Way (PNG)	5.67 w (wind: +3.3 m/s)
Triple jump	Angela Way (PNG)	12.03 (wind: +1.4 m/s) GR	Siulolo Liku (TGA)	12.01 (wind: +1.3 m/s)	Fabienne Dargos (NCL)	11.85 (wind: +0.9 m/s)
Shot put	(French Polynesia) /Margareth Bringold (TAH)	13.77	Marie-Christine Fakaté (NCL)	13.39	Iammo Launa (PNG)	13.16
Discus throw	Marie-Christine Fakaté (NCL)	45.60	(French Polynesia) /Margareth Bringold (TAH)	44.26	(French Polynesia) /Sandra Pito (TAH)	43.98
Javelin throw	Bina Ramesh (NCL)	58.14 GR	Rosemai Poilagi (NCL)	52.62	Iammo Launa (PNG)	48.50
Heptathlon	(French Polynesia) /Véronique Boyer (TAH)	4588	Sainiana Rokolewetini (FIJ)	4561	Brigitte Hardel (NCL)	4361
4 x 100 metres relay	Fiji; Vaciseva Tavaga; Rachel Rogers; Litiana Waqanitoga; Sereseini Likuwaqa	46.70 GR	New Caledonia; Valerie Nea; Emilie Wahnapo; Celina Goye; Laure Uedre	48.00	Papua New Guinea; Freda Gepp; Ale Gagole; Monica Jonathan; Shayne Avefa	48.03
4 x 400 metres relay	Fiji; Kelera Tania; Karolina Tanono; Salome Tabuatalei; Vaciseva Tavaga	3:48.22 GR	Vanuatu; Odile Daruhi; Aline Mermer; Olivet Bice; Mary-Estelle Kapalu	3:57.50	Papua New Guinea; Rubbie Apolos; Angela Way; Shayne Avefa; Ale Gagole	4:03.60

== Medal table (unofficial) ==
* Host nation (French Polynesia)

Rank	Nation	Gold	Silver	Bronze	Total
1	Fiji (FIJ)	14	17	9	40
2	New Caledonia (NCL)	10	10	6	26
3	French Polynesia (TAH)*	7	5	4	16
4	Papua New Guinea (PNG)	5	6	10	21
5	Vanuatu (VAN)	3	3	4	10
6	Tonga (TON)	2	1	4	7
7	Wallis and Futuna (WLF)	1	0	2	3
8	Guam (GUM)	0	0	1	1
8	Norfolk Island (NFK)	0	0	1	1
8	Solomon Islands (SOL)	0	0	1	1
Totals (10 entries)		42	42	42	126

== Participation (unofficial) ==
Athletes from the following 12 countries were reported to participate:

- Fiji
- Guam
- Federated States of Micronesia
- New Caledonia
- Norfolk Island
- Northern Mariana Islands
- Papua New Guinea
- Solomon Islands
- (French Polynesia) /Tahiti
- Tonga
- Vanuatu
- /Wallis and Futuna
