= Athletics at the 1993 South Pacific Mini Games =

Athletics at the IV South Pacific Mini Games
- Dates: December 10–16
- Host city: Port Vila, Vanuatu
- Level: Senior
- Events: 42 (23 men, 19 women)
- Participation: 15 nations

Athletics competitions at the 1993 South Pacific Mini Games were held in Port Vila, Vanuatu, between December 10–16, 1993.

A total of 42 events were contested, 23 by men and 19 by women.

== Medal summary ==
Medal winners and their results were published on the Athletics Weekly webpage courtesy of Tony Isaacs and Børre Lilloe, and on the Oceania Athletics Association webpage by Bob Snow.

Complete results can also be found on the Oceania Athletics Association, and on the Athletics PNG webpages.

=== Men ===
Event	Gold		Silver		Bronze	
100 metres (wind: -6.0 m/s)	Jone Delai (FIJ)	11.06	Subul Babo (PNG)	11.33	Peter Pulu (PNG)	11.37
200 metres (wind: -3.3 m/s)	Jone Delai (FIJ)	21.38	Subul Babo (PNG)	21.87	Solomone Bole (FIJ)	22.20
400 metres	Baobo Neuendorf (PNG)	47.33	Calvin Yee Koon Hoong (FIJ)	47.77	Baptiste Firiam (VAN)	47.87
800 metres	Thompson Harokave (PNG)	1:58.77	Baptiste Firiam (VAN)	1:59.10	Cliff Madu (PNG)	1:59.77
1500 metres	Tawai Keiruan (VAN)	3:58.28	Davendra Singh (FIJ)	3:59.01	Cliff Madu (PNG)	4:03.33
5000 metres	Davendra Singh (FIJ)	15:23.67	Morris Manai (PNG)	15:38.08	(French Polynesia) /Georges Richmond (TAH)	15:40.45
10000 metres	Davendra Singh (FIJ)	32:48.4	(French Polynesia) /Georges Richmond (TAH)	33:09.1	Philip Kamane (PNG)	33:18.7
Marathon	Binesh Prasad (FIJ)	2:40:52	Jean-Michel Boulanger (NCL)	2:43:33	Mahendra Prasad (FIJ)	2:50:13
3000 metres steeplechase	Davendra Singh (FIJ)	9:24.48	Tawai Keiruan (VAN)	9:30.45	Morris Manai (PNG)	9:44.91
110 metres hurdles (wind: -1.8 m/s)	Sekona Vi (TGA)	15.20	Albert Chambonnier (NCL)	15.34	Albert Miller (FIJ)	15.37
400 metres hurdles	Baobo Neuendorf (PNG)	53.11	Autiko Daunakamakama (FIJ)	53.32	Sekona Vi (TGA)	54.03
High jump	Jean-Bernard Fuller (NCL)	2.00	(French Polynesia) /Jean-Luc Mu Kwai Chuan (TAH)	1.97	Alfred Antipas (PNG)	1.94
Pole vault	(French Polynesia) /|Jean-Luc Mu Kwai Chuan (TAH)	4.50	Viliame Teumohenga (TGA)	4.50	(French Polynesia) /Thibaut Cattiau (TAH)	4.40
Long jump	(French Polynesia) /Apolosi Foliaki (TAH)	7.20 (wind: +1.5 m/s)	Tevita Fauonuku (TGA)	7.10 (wind: +1.7 m/s)	Patrice Kaddour (NCL)	6.99 (wind: +0.5 m/s)
Triple jump	Michel Louison (NCL)	15.81 (wind: +0.4 m/s)	Steeve Druminy (NCL)	15.02 (wind: +0.3 m/s)	(French Polynesia) /Apolosi Foliaki (TAH)	14.93 (wind: +1.5 m/s)
Shot put	Jean-Pierre Totélé (NCL)	16.67	Rocky Vaitanaki (NCL)	16.60	Laurent Pakihivatau (NCL)	15.62
Discus throw	Rocky Vaitanaki (NCL)	45.28	Jean-Pierre Totélé (NCL)	45.14	Laurent Pakihivatau (NCL)	43.92
Hammer throw	Laurent Pakihivatau (NCL)	54.00	Brentt Jones (NFK)	51.36	Frédéric Cassier (NCL)	49.48
Javelin throw	Gaëtan Siakinuu-Schmidt (NCL)	69.74	Jioji Nadavo (FIJ)	67.70	Antonio Sekeme (NCL)	64.60
Decathlon	Sekona Vi (TGA)	6472 w	Albert Miller (FIJ)	5906 w	Lorima Vunisa (FIJ)	5582 w
20 Kilometres Road Walk	Pramesh Prasad (FIJ)	1:54:09	Dip Chand (FIJ)	1:54:26	Pradeep Chand (FIJ)	2:00:03
4 x 100 metres relay	Fiji; Solomoni Bole; Jone Delai; Ponipate Tawake; Henry Rogo	40.47	Papua New Guinea; Ezekiel Wartovo; Subul Babo; Peter Pulu; Baobo Neuendorf	40.90	(French Polynesia) /Tahiti	42.19
4 x 400 metres relay	Fiji; Henry Rogo; Calvin Yee; Solomoni Bole; Jone Delai	3:09.97	Papua New Guinea; Subul Babo; Kaminiel Selot; Dalos Umul; Baobo Neuendorf	3:16.54	Vanuatu	3:17.70

=== Women ===
Event	Gold		Silver		Bronze	
100 metres (wind: -6.9 m/s)	Vaciseva Tavaga (FIJ)	12.54	Rachel Rogers (FIJ)	12.76	Litiana Waqanitoga (FIJ)	12.94
200 metres (wind: -2.5 m/s)	Vaciseva Tavaga (FIJ)	24.49	Rachel Rogers (FIJ)	24.95	Laure Uedre (NCL)	25.55
400 metres	Mary Estelle Kapalu (VAN)	54.25	Mary Unido (PNG)	56.20	Ilisapeci Ligalau (FIJ)	57.11
800 metres	Nadia Prasad (NCL)	2:13:55	Karolina Tanono (FIJ)	2:14.07	Ilisapeci Ligalau (FIJ)	2:15.90
1500 metres	Nadia Prasad (NCL)	4:30.19	Salome Tabuatalei (FIJ)	4:41.35	Vasa Tulahe (TGA)	4:47.82
3000 metres	Nadia Prasad (NCL)	9:46.87	Salome Tabuatalei (FIJ)	10:24.47	Rosemary Turare (PNG)	10:31.07
10000 metres	Nadia Prasad (NCL)	35:35.38	Rosemary Turare (PNG)	38:01.73	Pauline Vea (TGA)	38:08.41
Marathon	Marie-José Gardereau (NCL)	3:13:29	Pauline Vea (TGA)	3:19:00	Rosemary Turare (PNG)	3:54:19
100 metres hurdles (wind: -1.5 m/s)	Rachel Rogers (FIJ)	14.29	(French Polynesia) /Véronique Boyer (TAH)	14.55	Lillyanne Beining (PNG)	14.77
400 metres hurdles	Mary Estelle Kapalu (VAN)	60.99	Elizabeth Kamilus (PNG)	63.22	Rosi Tamani (FIJ)	74.07
High jump	(French Polynesia) /Véronique Boyer (TAH)	1.69	Mereani White (FIJ)	1.66	Angela Way (PNG)	1.60
Long jump	Marica Likulawedua (FIJ)	5.89 w (wind: +2.2 m/s)	Angela Way (PNG)	5.46 (wind: +1.3 m/s)	Iowana Vakaloloma (FIJ)	5.39 w (wind: +3.4 m/s)
Triple jump	(French Polynesia) /Véronique Boyer (TAH)	11.98 w (wind: +4.1 m/s)	Salanieta Tamani (FIJ)	11.34 (wind: +1.8 m/s)	Angela Way (PNG)	11.17 (wind: +1.7 m/s)
Shot put	Marie-Chanelle Sako (NCL)	13.67	Marie-Danielle Teanyouen (NCL)	13.56	Sera Cawanibuka (FIJ)	12.56
Discus throw	Pamela Ferland (NCL)	38.92	Marie-Chanelle Sako (NCL)	37.36	Linda Simutoga (NCL)	37.08
Javelin throw	Marie-Danielle Teanyouen (NCL)	49.00	Francesca Binet (NCL)	43.16	Linda Polelei (NCL)	41.66
Heptathlon	(French Polynesia) /Véronique Boyer (TAH)	4792	Lillyanne Beining (PNG)	4437	Iowana Vakaloloma (FIJ)	3290
4 x 100 metres relay	Fiji; Vaciseva Tavaga; Rachel Rogers; Rosi Tamani; Litiana Waqanitoga	47.63	New Caledonia	47.92	Papua New Guinea; Shayne Avefa; Mary Unido; Lillyanne Beining; Elizabeth Kamilus	48.49
4 x 400 metres relay	Fiji; Vaciseva Tavaga; Karolina Tanono; Ilisapeci Ligalau; Sisilia Dauniwe	3:45.73	Papua New Guinea; Mary Unido; Rosemary Nami; Ale Gagole; Elizabeth Kamilus	3:52.66	(French Polynesia) /Tahiti	4:03.17

== Medal table (unofficial) ==
* Host nation (Vanuatu)

Rank	Nation	Gold	Silver	Bronze	Total
1	Fiji (FIJ)	15	13	12	40
2	New Caledonia (NCL)	14	9	8	31
3	French Polynesia (TAH)	5	3	5	13
4	Papua New Guinea (PNG)	3	11	12	26
5	Vanuatu (VAN)*	3	2	2	7
6	Tonga (TON)	2	3	3	8
7	Norfolk Island (NFK)	0	1	0	1
Totals (7 entries)		42	42	42	126

== Participation (unofficial) ==
Athletes from the following 15 countries were reported to participate:

- American Samoa
- Cook Islands
- Fiji
- Guam
- Nauru
- New Caledonia
- Niue
- Norfolk Island
- Northern Mariana Islands
- Papua New Guinea
- Solomon Islands
- (French Polynesia) /Tahiti
- Tonga
- Vanuatu
- Western Samoa
