= Athletics at the 1997 South Pacific Mini Games =

Athletics at the V South Pacific Mini Games
- Dates: August 15–20
- Host city: Pago Pago, American Samoa
- Venue: Veterans Memorial Stadium
- Level: Senior
- Events: 42 (23 men, 19 women)
- Participation: 15 nations

Athletics competitions at the 1997 South Pacific Mini Games were held at the Veterans Memorial Stadium in Pago Pago, American Samoa, between August 15–20, 1997.

A total of 42 events were contested, 23 by men and 19 by women.

== Medal summary ==
Medal winners and their results were published on the Athletics Weekly webpage courtesy of Tony Isaacs and Børre Lilloe, and on the Oceania Athletics Association webpage by Bob Snow.

Complete results can also be found on the Oceania Athletics Association, and on the Athletics PNG webpages.

=== Men ===
Event	Gold		Silver		Bronze	
100 metres (wind: -2.0 m/s)	Jone Delai (FIJ)	10.52	Peter Pulu (PNG)	10.70	Toluta'u Koula (TGA)	10.82
200 metres (wind: -3.6 m/s)	Soloveni Koroi (FIJ)	21.36	Jone Delai (FIJ)	21.38	Aminiasi Babitu (FIJ)	21.54
400 metres	Soloveni Koroi (FIJ)	46.46	Solomone Bole (FIJ)	48.80	Samuel Bai (PNG)	49.14
800 metres	Isireli Naikelekelevesi (FIJ)	1:50.54	Selwyn Kole (SOL)	1:53.33	Sisari Vakasuka (FIJ)	1:56.13
1500 metres	Isireli Naikelekelevesi (FIJ)	3:56.07	Tawai Keiruan (VAN)	3:59.88	Selwyn Kole (SOL)	4:00.95
5000 metres	Primo Higa (SOL)	15:54.66	(French Polynesia) /Georges Richmond (TAH)	15:57.75	Tawai Keiruan (VAN)	15:58.40
10000 metres	Primo Higa (SOL)	33:19.96	(French Polynesia) /Georges Richmond (TAH)	33:19.98	Chris Votu (SOL)	34:36.18
Road running	(French Polynesia) /Georges Richmond (TAH)	2:08:59	Primo Higa (SOL)	2:11:46	Jean-Marie Zazina (NCL)	2:12:17
3000 metres steeplechase	Tawai Keiruan (VAN)	9:30.86	Primo Higa (SOL)	9:34.86	Isireli Naikelekelevesi (FIJ)	9:37.42
110 metres hurdles (wind: +2.8 m/s)	Jovesa Naivalu (FIJ)	13.9 (ht) w	Ah Chong Sam Chong (SAM)	14.3 (ht) w	Ivan Wakit (PNG)	14.4 (ht) w
400 metres hurdles	Jovesa Naivalu (FIJ)	51.87	Autiko Daunakamakama (FIJ)	52.64	Ivan Wakit (PNG)	53.25
High jump	Nathan Sua'mene (SAM)	2.04	Jone Kalouniviti (FIJ)	1.97	(French Polynesia) /Olivier Agusson (TAH)	1.91
Pole vault	Aisea Tukutau (TGA)	4.50	Jean-Bernard Harper (NCL)	4.40	Tokaikolo Latapu (TGA)	4.20
Long jump	Cédric Obertan (NCL)	7.16 w (wind: +4.4 m/s)	(French Polynesia) /Ali Yaya (TAH)	7.11 w (wind: +4.0 m/s)	Edward Bai (PNG)	7.00 (wind: +2.0 m/s)
Triple jump	Florent Eurisouke (NCL)	14.53 (wind: +1.9 m/s)	Fagamanu Sofai (SAM)	14.52 (wind: +1.5 m/s)	Jovesa Naivalu (FIJ)	14.49 w (wind: +3.6 m/s)
Shot put	Laurent Vili (NCL)	15.13	(French Polynesia) /Gordon Barff (TAH)	15.05	Rene Delamar (GUM)	14.50
Discus throw	(French Polynesia) /Gordon Barff (TAH)	48.88	Victor Sako (NCL)	41.54	Fine Sinipata (TGA)	40.20
Hammer throw	Soane Lakafia (NCL)	54.00	Brentt Jones (NFK)	52.48	Laurent Vili (NCL)	44.46
Javelin throw	James Goulding (FIJ)	73.58	Tevita Baleisavu (FIJ)	68.76	Andrew Ratawa (FIJ)	66.76
Decathlon	Joseph Rodan II (FIJ)	6235	Sekona Vi (TGA)	5958	Gaël Aonvase (NCL)	5331
20 Kilometres Road Walk	Dip Chand (FIJ)	1:49:23	Pradeep Chand (FIJ)	1:50:16	Manohar Maharaj (FIJ)	2:03:56
4 x 100 metres relay	Fiji; Aminiasi Babitu; Jone Delai; Soloveni Koroi Nakaunicina; Solomone Bole	40.15	Papua New Guinea; Alan Akia; Subul Babo; Terry Seph; Jeffrey Bai	41.77	Vanuatu; Baptiste Firiam; Jansen Molisingi; Jack Laurence; Jude Brown Tabeleo	42.11
4 x 400 metres relay	Fiji; Aminiasi Babitu; Solomone Bole; Seru Buwawa; Jone Delai	3:13.80	Papua New Guinea; Clement Abai; Subul Babo; Samuel Bai; Jeffrey Bai	3:16.63	Vanuatu; Tavakalo Kailes; Jude Brown Tabeleo; Baptiste Firiam; Harrison Solomon	3:21.56

=== Women ===
Event	Gold		Silver		Bronze	
100 metres (wind: -3.3 m/s)	Siulolo Liku (TGA)	12.60	Vaciseva Tavaga (FIJ)	12.64	Rachel Rogers (FIJ)	12.78
200 metres (wind: -3.6 m/s)	Rossa Maira (PNG)	25.47	Rachel Rogers (FIJ)	25.53	Vaciseva Tavaga (FIJ)	25.89
400 metres	Rossa Maira (PNG)	57.74	Karolina Tanono (FIJ)	57.98	Laisa Dibuka (FIJ)	59.04
800 metres	Karolina Tanono (FIJ)	2:14.93	Salome Tabuatalei (FIJ)	2:17.59	Vasa Tulahe (TGA)	2:18.87
1500 metres	Salome Tabuatalei (FIJ)	5:04.81	Karolina Tanono (FIJ)	5:04.98	Lynn Pokou (PNG)	5:16.99
3000 metres	Salome Tabuatalei (FIJ)	11:02.78	Vasa Tulahe (TGA)	11:08.78	(French Polynesia) /Vaite Bounhoure (TAH)	11:14.76
10000 metres	Salome Tabuatalei (FIJ)	43:46.0	Sieni Skelton (ASA)	45:50.0		
100 metres hurdles (wind: +1.8 m/s)	Rachel Rogers (FIJ)	13.6	Siulolo Liku (TGA)	13.8	(French Polynesia) /Cécile Tiatia (TAH)	15.8
400 metres hurdles	Laisa Dibuka (FIJ)	62.72	Apikali Kainoco (FIJ)	63.04	(French Polynesia) /Cécile Tiatia (TAH)	66.07
High jump	Angela Way (PNG)	1.74	(French Polynesia) /Albertine Teriierooiterai (TAH)	1.55	Rosalia Raqato (FIJ)	1.50
Long jump	Siulolo Liku (TGA)	6.19 w (wind: +3.7 m/s)	Vani Senokonoko (FIJ)	5.64 w (wind: +4.4 m/s)	Marica Likulawedua (FIJ)	5.47 (wind: +2.0 m/s)
Triple jump	Siulolo Liku (TGA)	12.49 w (wind: +2.5 m/s)	Julie Julien (NCL)	11.40 w (wind: +3.7 m/s)	Marica Likulawedua (FIJ)	11.23 w (wind: +2.4 m/s)
Shot put	Lisa Misipeka (ASA)	14.37	Marie-Christine Fakaté (NCL)	13.04	Maria Livanawa (FIJ)	12.90
Discus throw	Marie-Christine Fakaté (NCL)	44.64	Lisa Misipeka (ASA)	43.32	Siniva Marsters (COK)	43.27
Hammer throw	Lisa Misipeka (ASA)	58.20	Marie-Christine Fakaté (NCL)	32.76	Tenisia Mahitoga (NCL)	30.50
Javelin throw	Iloai Suaniu (SAM)	46.10	Tenisia Mahitoga (NCL)	43.68	Maria Livanawa (FIJ)	43.38
Heptathlon	Vani Senokonoko (FIJ)	4265	(French Polynesia) /Albertine Teriierooiterai (TAH)	3798		
4 x 100 metres relay	Fiji; Seini Soroacagi; Rachel Rogers; Vaciseva Tavaga; Josivini Maria	47.36	(French Polynesia) /Tahiti; Heilanie Teraimana; Christine Coquil; Vaiana Teganahau; Cécile Tiatia	51.28	Samoa; Agape Ualesi; Siosina Lui; Lanuola Keil; Tooa Ah Chong	52.13
4 x 400 metres relay	Fiji; Laisa Dibuka; Apikali Kainoco; Seini Soroacagi; Karolina Tanono	3:58.41	Papua New Guinea; Monica Jonathan; Angela Way; Della Marava; Rossa Maira	4:16.53	(French Polynesia) /Tahiti; Dolores Dogba; Vaite Bonhoure; Vaiana Teganahau; Christine Coquil	4:27.58

== Medal table ==
The medal table was published.

* Host nation (American Samoa)

Rank	Nation	Gold	Silver	Bronze	Total
1	Fiji (FIJ)	21	13	14	48
2	New Caledonia (NCL)	5	6	4	15
3	Tonga (TON)	4	3	4	11
4	Papua New Guinea (PNG)	3	4	5	12
5	French Polynesia (TAH)	2	7	5	14
6	Solomon Islands (SOL)	2	3	2	7
7	Samoa (SAM)	2	2	1	5
8	American Samoa (ASA)*	2	2	0	4
9	Vanuatu (VAN)	1	1	3	5
10	Norfolk Island (NFK)	0	1	0	1
11	Cook Islands (COK)	0	0	1	1
11	Guam (GUM)	0	0	1	1
Totals (12 entries)		42	42	40	124

== Participation (unofficial) ==
Athletes from the following 15 countries were reported to participate:

- American Samoa
- Cook Islands
- Fiji
- Guam
- Federated States of Micronesia
- New Caledonia
- Norfolk Island
- Northern Mariana Islands
- Palau
- Papua New Guinea
- Samoa
- Solomon Islands
- (French Polynesia) /Tahiti
- Tonga
- Vanuatu
