= List of Fijian records in athletics =

The following are the national records in athletics in Fiji maintained by Fiji's national athletics federation: Athletics Fiji (AF).

== Outdoor ==
Key to tables: Awaiting ratification Record not kept by AF Not ratified or later rescinded by AF

# = not ratified by federation

=== Men ===
Event	Record	Athlete	Date	Meet	Place	Ref.
100 m	10.20 (+1.2 m/s)	Banuve Tabakaucoro	8 July 2016	Melanesian Championships	Suva, Fiji	
100 m	10.2 h (Note: doubtful timing)	Banuve Tabakaucoro	29 March 2012	Suva Zone Two Meet	Suva, Fiji	
200 m	20.53 (−1.5 m/s)	Banuve Tabakaucoro	16 July 2015	Pacific Games	Port Moresby, Papua New Guinea	
400 m	45.82	Saimoni Tamani	23 July 1970	British Commonwealth Games	Edinburgh, United Kingdom	
800 m	1:48.70	Isireli Naikelekelevesi	8 August 2004		Szombathely, Hungary	
1000 m	2:26.4 h	Isireli Naikelekelevesi	14 August 1995		Pirae, French Polynesia	
1500 m	3:42.81	Richard Kermode	13 February 1982		Auckland, New Zealand	
Mile	4:14.24	Isireli Naikelekelevesi	8 May 2004		Brisbane, Australia	
3000 m	8:13.6 h	Usaia Sotutu	4 July 1971		Celje, S.F.R. Yugoslavia	
5000 m	14:22.50	Yeshnil Karan	5 March 2025	Box Hill Burn	Box Hill, Australia	
10,000 m	30:19.92	Yeshnil Karan	22 April 2025	UniSport Nationals Athletics	Gold Coast, Australia	
Half marathon	1:07:57	Binesh Prasad	6 February 1993		Las Vegas, United States	
Marathon	2:23:33	Binesh Prasad	4 February 1989		Las Vegas, United States	
110 m hurdles	13.82 (+0.3 m/s)	Jovesa Naivalu	5 August 1997	World Championships	Athens, Greece	
400 m hurdles	51.67	Jovesa Naivalu	9 June 1999	South Pacific Games	Santa Rita, Guam	
3000 m steeplechase	8:48.0 h	Usaia Sotutu	17 June 1971		Seattle, United States	
High jump	2.09 m (Note: indoor mark ratified as absolute record)	Antonio Rahiman	5 April 2003		Suva, Fiji	
High jump	2.09 m	Malakai Kaiwalu	8 July 2016	Melanesian Championships	Suva, Fiji	
Pole vault	4.45 m	Joseph Rodan	28 July 2002	Commonwealth Games	Manchester, United Kingdom	
Long jump	7.82 m (+1.4 m/s)	Eroni Tuivanuavou	11 July 2003	South Pacific Games	Suva, Fiji	
Triple jump	16.08 m (−2.9 m/s)	Eugene Vollmer	24 May 2012	NAIA Championships	Marion, United States	
Shot put	17.75 m	Mustafa Fall	19 July 2019	Pacific Games	Apia, Samoa	
Discus throw	53.89 m A	Mustafa Fall	17 May 2019	NJCAA Division I Championships	Hobbs, United States	
Hammer throw	55.11 m	Abineet Ram	15 April 2017	Woody Wilson Classic	Davis, United States	
Javelin throw	81.76 m	Leslie Copeland	3 April 2016	Australian Championships	Sydney, Australia	
Decathlon	7397 pts	Albert Miller	23–24 May 1983		Cape Girardeau, United States	
Decathlon	100m / Long jump / Shot put / High jump / 400m / 110m H / Discus / Pole vault / Javelin / 1500m; 11.22 / 6.94 m / 12.64 m / 1.93 m / 49.73 / 14.60 / 38.54 m / 3.80 m / 62.14 m / 4:35.57					
3000 m walk (track)	13:08.2	Manohar Maharaj	30 November 1996		Suva, Fiji	
5000 m walk (track)	24:52.6	Dip Chand	28 March 1997		Suva, Fiji	
10,000 m walk (track)	50:43.7	Dip Chand	7 July 1995		Suva, Fiji	
10 km walk (road)	54:30	Dip Chand	29 November 1996	Oceania Championships	Townsville, Australia	
10 km walk (road)	50:43.7 #	Dip Chand	7 July 1995		Suva, Fiji	
20 km walk (road)	1:46:53	Caleb Maybir	28 May 1991		Brisbane, Australia	
20 km walk (road)	1:36:35 #	Dip Chand	13 April 1998		Suva, Fiji	
50 km walk (road)	5:25:00 #	Dip Chand	3 September 2000		Melbourne, Australia	
50 km walk (road)	5:50:19	Caleb Maybir	28 June 1992		Brisbane, Australia	
4 × 100 m relay	40.15	Fiji; Aminiasi Babitu; Jone Delai; Soloveni Koroi Nakaunicina; Solomone Bole	20 August 1997	South Pacific Mini Games	Tafuna, American Samoa	
4 × 400 m relay	3:07.15	Fiji; Aminiasi Babitu; Henry Semiti Rogo; Solomone Bole; Soloveni Koroi Nakaunicina	20 September 1998	Commonwealth Games	Kuala Lumpur, Malaysia	
4 × 400 m relay	3:07.03^{†} #	Fiji; Waisea Finau; Navitalai Naivalu; Iliesa Namosimalua; Niko Verekauta	24 March 2006	Commonwealth Games	Melbourne, Australia	

^{†}: 3:07.73 by another source.

=== Women ===
Event	Record	Athlete	Date	Meet	Place	Ref.
100 m	11.55 (+0.1 m/s)	Makelesi Batimala	4 September 2007	Pacific Games	Apia, Samoa	
200 m	23.22 (+1.9 m/s)	Makelesi Batimala	20 July 2008	KBC Night of Athletics	Heusden-Zolder, Netherlands	
300 m	37.91	Makelesi Batimala	10 August 2004		Ljubljana, Slovenia	
400 m	51.89	Makelesi Batimala	26 June 2004		Brisbane, Australia	
800 m	2:08.81	Makelesi Batimala	30 May 2008		Brisbane, Australia	
1000 m	3:05.48	Kavita Maharaj	17 October 1999		Brisbane, Australia	
1500 m	4:39.1 h	Salome Tabuatalei	8 July 1995		Suva, Fiji	
2000 m	6:54.0 h	Salome Tabuatalei	7 July 1995		Suva, Fiji	
3000 m	10:18.7 h (Note: by AF source; 10:18.6 by OAA source)	Salome Tabuatalei	9 February 1994 (Note: by World Athletics source; 12 February 1994 by OAA source)		Auckland, New Zealand	
5000 m	18:22.6 h	Salome Tabuatalei	27 May 1995		Suva, Fiji	
10,000 m	38:49.6 h	Salome Tabuatalei	2 October 1993		Suva, Fiji	
Half marathon	1:31:09 (Note: by OAA source; 1:39:09 by AF source)	Salome Tabuatalei	13 June 1993		Nouméa, New Caledonia	
Marathon	4:13:06 (Note: not ratified by AF but recognized by World Athletics)	Anna Cowley	21 July 2018		Suva, Fiji	
Marathon	3:58:57	Victoria Domico	27 July 2019	Island Chill Suva Marathon	Suva, Fiji	
100 m hurdles	13.62 (−0.4 m/s)	Rachael Rogers	8 February 1998		Canberra, Australia	
100 m hurdles	13.5 h	Rachael Rogers	12 April 2003		Runaway Bay, Queensland, Australia	
400 m hurdles	1:01.01	Ana Kaloucava	19 July 2019	Pacific Games	Apia, Samoa	
3000 m steeplechase						
High jump	1.71 m	Shawntell Lockington	16 September 2017		Suva, Fiji	
Pole vault	3.60 m	Eseta Finau	22 April 2017		Los Gatos, United States	
Long jump	6.12 m	Miriama Chambault	30 November 1979		Nouméa, New Caledonia	
Triple jump	12.86 m (−0.7 m/s)	Milika Tuivanuavou	13 April 2013	PacWest Conference Championships	Claremont, United States	
Shot put	14.73 m	Miliki Tuivanuavou	11 April 2015	Mangrum Invitational	San Marcos, United States	
Discus throw	47.76 m	Mereoni Vibose	2 April 1983		Suva, Fiji	
Hammer throw	49.68 m	Avi Bulai	4 May 2018		Hutchinson, United States	
Javelin throw	49.28 m (new design)	Sisilia Lau	10 July 2003	South Pacific Games	Suva, Fiji	
Javelin throw	53.18 m (old design)	Mereoni Vibose	24 October 1987		Suva, Fiji	
Heptathlon	4822 pts	Sainiana Tukana	17–18 December 1987	South Pacific Games	Nouméa, New Caledonia	
Heptathlon	100m H / High jump / Shot put / 200m / Long jump / Javelin / 800m; 15.55 / 1.66 m / 8.83 m / 26.12 / 5.56 m / 33.98 m / 2:26.54					
20 km walk (road)	2:47:33	Deepika Chand	10 July 2003	South Pacific Games	Suva, Fiji	
4 × 100 m relay	44.86	Fiji; Litiana Miller; Makelesi Bulikiobo; Mereoni Raluve; Rachael Rogers	12 July 2003	South Pacific Games	Suva, Fiji	
4 × 400 m relay	3:41.03	Fiji; Torika Odro; Paulini Korowaqa; Anameli Navukitu; Makelesi Batimala	8 September 2007	Pacific Games	Apia, Samoa	
4 × 400 m relay	3:40.03 #	Fiji; Vasiti Vatureba; Makelesi Bulikiobo; Miriama Radiniwaimaro; Mereoni Ratuve	12 July 2003	South Pacific Games	Suva, Fiji	

^{‡}: another source states 17 March 2013.

=== Mixed ===
Event	Record	Athletes	Date	Meet	Place	Ref.
4 × 400 m relay	3:31.77	Fiji; Waisake Tewa; Heleina Young; Waisea Tuiyabayaba; Adi Ceva Lutumailagi	8 July 2025	Pacific Mini Games	Koror, Palau	

== Indoor ==
=== Men ===
Event	Record	Athlete	Date	Meet	Place	Ref.
55 m	6.23 A	Jone Delai	8 February 1997		Reno, United States	
60 m	6.87	Aaron Powell	19 September 2017	Asian Indoor and Martial Arts Games	Ashgabat, Turkmenistan	
200 m	21.64 A	Soloveni Nakaunicina	8 February 1997		Reno, United States	
400 m	49.55	Samuela Railoa	18 September 2017	Asian Indoor and Martial Arts Games	Ashgabat, Turkmenistan	
400 m	47.0 A	Saimoni Tamani	27 February 1971		Pocatello, United States	
400 m	47.0 y OT	Saimoni Tamani	13 February 1971		Houston, United States	
600 m	1:19.37 OT	Ratutira Narara	1 January 2013		Lubbock United States	
800 m	2:01.75 OT	Abaramo Ratucove	21 February 2026	Region VI/KJCCC Indoor Championships	Pittsburg, United States	
1500 m	4:16.10 y	Morgan Clark	20 February 2004		Clemson, United States	
Mile	4:16.10 y	Morgan Clark	20 February 2004		Clemson, United States	
Mile	4:16.1 h	Usaia Sotutu	January 1971		Provo, United States	
3000 m	8:40.11	Morgan Clark	21 February 2004		Clemson, United States	
3000 m	8:34.48	Morgan Clark	8 February 2002		Chapel Hill, United States	
5000 m	15:47.97	Morgan Clark	10 January 2004		Chapel Hill, United States	
50 m hurdles	7.09	Joseph Rodan	20 January 2001	Los Angeles Invitational	Los Angeles, United States	
55 m hurdles	7.46 A	Jovesa Naivalu	8 February 1997		Reno, United States	
60 m hurdles	8.45	Errol Bernard Qaqa	18 September 2017	Asian Indoor and Martial Arts Games	Ashgabat, Turkmenistan	
High jump	2.10 m	Rusiate Matai	8 February 2025	Bearcat Invitational	Maryville, United States	
Pole vault	4.41 m	Joseph Rodan Jr.	16 February 2002		Pomona, United States	
Long jump	7.37 m	Eugene Vollmer	18 February 2012	Fresno Pacific/Pt. Loma Dual Meet	Fresno, United States	
Triple jump	15.62 m	Eugene Vollmer	5 March 2011	NAIA Championships	Geneva, United States	
Shot put	18.35 m	Mustafa Fall	6 March 2020	NJCAA Championships	Lynchburg, United States	
Heptathlon	4636 pts	Waisele Inoke	22–23 February 2025	Region VI/KJCCC Championships	Pittsburg, United States	
Heptathlon	60m / Long jump / Shot put / High jump / 60m H / Pole vault / 1000m; 6.92 / 6.63 m / 11.94 m / 1.87 m / 8.83 / 3.15 m / 3:14.35					
5000 m walk						
4 × 400 m relay						

=== Women ===
Event	Record	Athlete	Date	Meet	Place	Ref.
60 m	7.69	Makereta Naulu	19 September 2017	Asian Indoor and Martial Arts Games	Ashgabat, Turkmenistan	
200 m	27.25	Ana Baleveicau	6 February 2015		Joplin, United States	
200 m	26.27 OT	Ana Baleveicau	28 February 2015		Lubbock, United States	
400 m	54.02	Makelesi Batimala	7 March 2008	World Championships	Valencia, Spain	
600 m	1:37.11	Anna Baleveicau	7/8 March 2014		New York City, United States	
800 m	2:24.18	Ana Baleveicau	7/8 March 2014		New York City, United States	
1500 m						
3000 m						
55 m hurdles	8.96	Alisha Dickinson	14 February 2014		Lubbock, United States	
60 m hurdles	9.10	Fane Sauvakacolo	20 January 2023	SDSU Division II Invite	Brookings, United States	
High jump	1.60 m	Milika Tuivanuavou	3 March 2011	NAIA Championships	Cedarville, United States	
Pole vault						
Long jump	5.93 m	Milika Tuivanuavou	15 February 2013	NCCAA Championships	Marion, United States	
Triple jump	12.77 m	Milika Tuivanuavou	16 February 2013	NCCAA Championships	Marion, United States	
Shot put	14.69 m	Milika Tuivanuavou	3 March 2012	NAIA Championships	Geneva, United States	
Pentathlon	3362 pts OT	Milika Tuivanuavou	3 March 2011		Geneva, United States	
Pentathlon	60m H / High jump / Shot put / Long jump / 800m; 9.20 / 1.60 m / 13.04 m / 5.26 m / 2:56.77					
Pentathlon	3401 pts #	Milika Tuivanuavou	28 January 2011	Fresno Pacific All-Comers	Fresno, United States	
Pentathlon	60m H / High jump / Shot put / Long jump / 800m; / / / 5.67 m / 2:54.57					
Pentathlon	2981 pts #	Milika Tuivanuavou	5 February 2010		Fresno, United States	
Pentathlon	60m H / High jump / Shot put / Long jump / 800m; 9.15 (55m hurdles) / 1.50 m / 13.47 m / 5.29 m / 3:17.64					
3000 m walk						
4 × 400 m relay						
