= List of Vanuatuan records in athletics =

The following are the national records in athletics in Vanuatu maintained by the Vanuatu Athletics Federation.

== Outdoor ==
Key to tables: Awaiting ratification Record not kept by Athletics Vanuatu Not ratified or later rescinded by Athletics Vanuatu

=== Men ===
Event	Record	Athlete	Date	Meet	Place	Ref.
100 m	10.64 (+0.5 m/s)	Moses Kamut	26 July 2005	South Pacific Mini Games	Koror, Palau	
100 m	10.64 (−0.6 m/s)	Moses Kamut	18 February 2006	Melbourne Track Classic	Melbourne, Australia	
100 m	10.64 (+2.0 m/s)	Moses Kamut	15 March 2008		Auckland, New Zealand	
100 m	10.4 h NWI	Carles Godden	31 August 1968		Port Vila, New Hebrides	
100 m	10.4 h NWI	Carles Godden	15 August 1970		Port Vila, New Hebrides	
100 m	10.4 h NWI	Jerry Jeremiah	4 September 1984		Luganville, Vanuatu	
200 m	21.57 (−2.7 m/s)	Moses Kamut	19 August 2007	Melanesian Regional Championships	Cairns, Australia	
400 m	47.62	Baptiste Firiam	7 March 1996		Sydney, Australia	
800 m	1:51.13	Arnold Sorina	8 October 2010	Commonwealth Games	Delhi, India	
1000 m	2:32.55	Tavakalo Kailes	26 July 1995		Flein, Germany	
1500 m	3:58.28	Tawai Keiruan	16 December 1993	South Pacific Mini Games	Port Vila, Vanuatu	
3000 m	8:54.8	Tawai Keiruan	11 March 1995		Canberra, Australia	
5000 m	15:08.1	Tawai Keiruan	25 July 1997		Port Vila, Vanuatu	
10,000 m	33:04.1	Jimmy Sandy Sam	7 July 2003	South Pacific Games	Suva, Fiji	
Half marathon	1:12:39	Philip Nausien	4 July 2010	Gold Coast Half Marathon	Gold Coast, Queensland, Australia	
110 m hurdles	15.33 NWI	Dicko Japheth	14 December 2017	Pacific Mini Games	Port Vila, Vanuatu	
400 m hurdles	52.94	David Benjimen	21 June 2011	Oceania Regional Championships	Apia, Samoa	
3000 m steeplechase	9:21.11	Tawai Keiruan	18 August 1995	South Pacific Games	Pirae, French Polynesia	
High jump	2.00 m	Édouard Robsen	2 August 1985	South Pacific Mini Games	Avarua, Cook Islands	
Pole vault	3.70 m	André Koulon	28 July 1975		Port Vila, New Hebrides	
Long jump	7.18 m	Georges Taniel	1 September 1984		Luganville, Vanuatu	
Triple jump	14.65 m	Georges Taniel	31 August 1978		Pirae, French Polynesia	
Shot put	14.27 m	Georges Laurence	27 June 1980		Port Vila, Vanuatu	
Discus throw	45.84 m	Georges Laurence	7 September 1982		Port Vila, Vanuatu	
Hammer throw	34.31 m	Lachlan Kalsau	13 December 2017	Pacific Mini Games	Port Vila, Vanuatu	
Javelin throw	61.73 m (new design)	Jack Nasawa	15/17 December 2021		Port Vila, Vanuatu	
Javelin throw	65.54 m^{†} (old design)	Bruno Cevuard	7 September 1979	South Pacific Games	Suva, Fiji	
Decathlon	5448 pts h	David Naupa	14–15 September 1971	South Pacific Games	Pirae, French Polynesia	
Decathlon	100m / Long jump / Shot put / High jump / 400m / 110m H / Discus / Pole vault / Javelin / 1500m; 11.49 / 6.20 m / 8.67 m / 1.66 m / 51.0 / 18.24 / 22.36 m / 2.80 m / 46.46 m / 4:33.9					
10 km walk (road)	1:02:31	Jessie Owens	18 June 1995		Port Vila, Vanuatu	
20 km walk (road)						
50 km walk (road)						
4 × 100 m relay	41.73	Vanuatu; Steeve Lolten; Bradly Toa; Brandy Mento; Markly Simeon	13 December 2017	Pacific Mini Games	Port Vila, Vanuatu	
4 × 100 m relay	41.26 (Note: with a foreigner)	Vanuatu; Franckie Mariello; Jansen Molisingi; Baptiste Firiam; Laurence Jack	24 August 1995	South Pacific Games	Pirae, French Polynesia	
4 × 400 m relay	3:16.09	Vanuatu; Tavakalo Kailes; Jean-Pierre Tiopang; Tawai Keiruan; Baptiste Firiam	24 August 1995	South Pacific Games	Pirae, French Polynesia	

^{†}: Result obtained during decathlon

=== Women ===
Event	Record	Athlete	Date	Meet	Place	Ref.
100 m	12.51	Roslyn Nalin	16 July 2019		Apia, Samoa	
100 m	12.30 NWI	Georgette Delaplane^{‡}	7 September 1976		Nouméa, New Caledonia	
100 m	12.0 h	Georgette Delaplane^{‡}	12 July 1976		Nouméa, New Caledonia	
200 m	24.85 NWI	Mary Estelle Kapalu	22 August 1995	South Pacific Games	Pirae, French Polynesia	
200 m	24.8 h	Mary Estelle Kapalu	25 June 1995		Lae, Papua New Guinea	
400 m	53.92	Mary Estelle Kapalu	5 August 1995	World Championships	Gothenburg, Sweden	
800 m	2:13.69	Mary Estelle Kapalu	22 August 1995	South Pacific Games	Pirae, French Polynesia	
1500 m	4:59.49	Lilly Hunai	11 June 1999	South Pacific Games	Santa Rita, Guam	
3000 m	11:09.2	Lily Iawantak	4 September 2001		Port Vila, Vanuatu	
5000 m	20:26.9	Serah Kausir	22 August 2003		Lenakel, Vanuatu	
10,000 m	48:29.0	Marie Rose	12–14 December 2016		Luganville, Vanuatu	
100 m hurdles	15.68 NWI	Leitaou Essaou	7 September 1979	South Pacific Games	Suva, Fiji	
100 m hurdles	14.90 NWI	Georgette Delaplane^{‡}	30 August 1976		Nouméa, New Caledonia	
400 m hurdles	58.68	Mary Estelle Kapalu	28 July 1996	Olympic Games	Atlanta, United States	
3000 m steeplechase	12:03.71	Marie Nakou	30 August 2017		China	
High jump	1.51 m	Anna Lemus-Bihu	31 August 1978		Pirae, French Polynesia	
High jump	1.58 m	Loain Pierrez^{‡}	6 September 1979	South Pacific Games	Suva, Fiji	
Pole vault						
Long jump	5.45 m	Anna Lemus-Bihu	12 November 1977		Port Vila, New Hebrides	
Long jump	5.74 m	Georgette Delaplane^{‡}	28 August 1976		Nouméa, New Caledonia	
Triple jump	10.68 m	Fiona Peters	24 July 1997		Port Vila, Vanuatu	
Shot put	12.05 m	Madeleine Nirua	9 June 1979		Port Vila, New Hebrides	
Discus throw	38.56 m	Maryline Adam	9 September 1983	South Pacific Games	Apia, Western Samoa	
Hammer throw	19.31 m	Elis Malep	12 December 2017	Pacific Mini Games	Port Vila, Vanuatu	
Javelin throw	36.36 m (new design)	Rachelle Revevouro	7 September 2001		Port Vila, Vanuatu	
Javelin throw	42.12 m (old design)	Germaine Naio	1972		Port Vila, New Hebrides	
Heptathlon	2345 pts h	Elisa Rouvone	11 July 1998		Port Vila, Vanuatu	
Heptathlon	100m H / High jump / Shot put / 200m / Long jump / Javelin / 800m; 22.0 / 1.27 m / 7.35 m / 29.7 / 4.30 m / 21.67 m / 3:09.6					
20 km walk (road)						
4 × 100 m relay	49.03	Vanuatu; Odile Daruhi; Aline Mermer; Olivette Bice; Mary Estelle Kapalu	24 August 1995	South Pacific Games	Pirae, French Polynesia	
4 × 100 m relay	49.03	Vanuatu; Judithe Alatoa; Christelle Kalopong; Lyza Malres; Roslyn Nalin	13 December 2017	Pacific Mini Games	Port Vila, Vanuatu	
4 × 400 m relay	3:57.50	Vanuatu; Odile Daruhi; Aline Mermer; Olivette Bice; Mary Estelle Kapalu	24 August 1995	South Pacific Games	Pirae, French Polynesia	

^{‡}: French citizens

=== Mixed ===
Event	Record	Athletes	Date	Meet	Place	Ref.
4 × 400 m relay	4:00.04	Vanuatu	7 June 2024	Oceania Championships	Suva, Fiji	
4 × 400 m relay	3:52.28	Vanuatu; Rizon Rara; Chloe David; Ralph Andre; Priscilla Monthouel	8 July 2025	Pacific Mini Games	Koror, Palau	

== Indoor ==
=== Men ===
Event	Record	Athlete	Date	Meet	Place	Ref.
60 m	7.06	Daniel Philimon	19 September 2017	Asian Indoor and Martial Arts Games	Ashgabat, Turkmenistan	
200 m						
400 m	49.92	Tikie Mael	2 March 2018	World Championships	Birmingham, United Kingdom	
800 m	1:54.44	Arnold Sorina	9 March 2012	World Championships	Istanbul, Turkey	
1500 m						
3000 m						
60 m hurdles						
High jump						
Pole vault						
Long jump	5.98 m	Frenly Volul	19 September 2017	Asian Indoor and Martial Arts Games	Ashgabat, Turkmenistan	
Triple jump						
Shot put						
Heptathlon						
Heptathlon	60m / Long jump / Shot put / High jump / 60m H / Pole vault / 1000m					
5000 m walk						
4 × 400 m relay	3:28.52	Paul Nalau; George Molisingi; Daniel Philimon; Nathan Kalman	20 September 2017	Asian Indoor and Martial Arts Games	Ashgabat, Turkmenistan	

=== Women ===
Event	Record	Athlete	Date	Meet	Place	Ref.
60 m	9.06	Daphne Nalawas	10 March 2012	World Championships	Istanbul, Turkey	
200 m						
400 m						
800 m						
1500 m						
3000 m						
60 m hurdles						
High jump						
Pole vault						
Long jump						
Triple jump						
Shot put						
Pentathlon						
Pentathlon	60m H / High jump / Shot put / Long jump / 800m					
3000 m walk						
4 × 400 m relay						
