= 1994 Oceania Athletics Championships =

II Oceania Athletics Championships
- Dates: February 23–26
- Host city: Auckland, New Zealand
- Level: Senior
- Events: 41 (22 men, 19 women)
- Participation: 15 nations

The 1994 Oceania Athletics Championships were held in Auckland, New Zealand, between February 23–26, 1994.

A total of 41 events were contested, 22 by men and 19 by women.

== Medal summary ==
Medal winners were published. Complete results can be found as compiled by Bob Snow from Athletics Papua New Guinea.

=== Men ===
Event	Gold		Silver		Bronze	
100 metres (wind: -0.3 m/s)	Jone Delai; Fiji	10.63	Chris Wilkinson; New Zealand	10.82	Ross Fitzpatrick; New Zealand	10.83
200 metres (wind: +0.7 m/s)	Jone Delai; Fiji	21.55	Solomone Bole; Fiji	21.94	James Noblet; Australia	21.97
400 metres	Mark Wilson; New Zealand	47.25	Dean Sheddan; New Zealand	48.22	Rhoderick Grivas; Australia	48.62
800 metres	Mark Tonks; New Zealand	1:50.38	Mark Turner; New Zealand	1:51.30	Rhoderick Grivas; Australia	1:52.15
1500 metres	John Henwood; New Zealand	3:51.71	Stephen Blair; New Zealand	3:52.08	Daniel Hill; Australia	3:52.35
5000 metres	Jason Cameron; New Zealand	14:44.62	Thor Anderson; Vanuatu	16:07.78	Morris Manai; Papua New Guinea	16:07.84
10000 metres	Paul McRae; New Zealand	31:11.97	Parshottam Lal; Fiji	33:26.81	Ashok Kumar; Fiji	33:43.65
Marathon	Robert Holland; New Zealand	2:33:16	Mervyn Shields; New Zealand	2:39:29	Ian Moore; Australia	2:41:11
3000 metres steeplechase	Hamish Christensen; New Zealand	8:54.74	Matthew Holder; New Zealand	9:08.55	Davendra Singh; Fiji	9:21.64
110 metres hurdles (wind: +2.7 m/s)	Nick Bolton; New Zealand	14.67w	/Robert Tupuhoé; French Polynesia	14.95w	Sekona Vi; Tonga	15.15w
400 metres hurdles	Nick Bolton; New Zealand	53.01	Sekona Vi; Tonga	53.51	Autiko Daunakamakama; Fiji	53.79
High jump	Michael Sharapoff; New Zealand	2.05	Arvindra Maharaj; Fiji	1.99	/Jean-Luc Mu Kwai Chuan; French Polynesia	1.93
Pole vault	/Thibaut Cattiau; French Polynesia	4.55	/Jean-Luc Mu Kwai Chuan; French Polynesia	4.45	Lee Brown; Australia	4.45
Long jump	Aaron Langdon; New Zealand	7.62w	Julian Manderson; Australia	7.43w	/Apolosi Foliaki; French Polynesia	7.01w
Triple jump	/Apolosi Foliaki; French Polynesia	14.95	Steeve Druminy; New Caledonia	14.84	Driss Doukari; Australia	14.38w
Shot put	Patrick Hellier; New Zealand	16.10	Matt Gadsby; Australia	15.59	Kevin Galea; Australia	15.40
Discus throw	/Gordon Barff; French Polynesia	48.54	Patrick Hellier; New Zealand	48.54	Ian Boller; Australia	47.46
Hammer throw	Patrick Hellier; New Zealand	63.16	Yannick Fakaté; New Caledonia	52.20	Brentt Jones; Norfolk Island	51.34
Javelin throw	Steven Madeo; Australia	67.84	Jioji Nadavo; Fiji	65.40	André Hmalako; New Caledonia	58.82
20 Kilometres Road Walk	Shane Brown; New Zealand	1:43:55	Mark Nipperess; Australia	1:51:56	Dip Chand; Fiji	1:57:42
4 x 100 metres relay	New Zealand	41.57	Australia	41.98	Tonga	42.43
4 x 400 metres relay	Fiji	3:12.40	New Zealand	3:13.11	Australia	3:18.73

=== Women ===
Event	Gold		Silver		Bronze	
100 metres (wind: -1.0 m/s)	Vaciseva Tavaga; Fiji	12.17	Lauretta Graham; New Zealand	12.57	Vani Senokonoko; Fiji	12.77
200 metres (wind: +3.4 m/s)	Vaciseva Tavaga; Fiji	24.37w	Suzanne Coleman; New Zealand	24.89w	Tara Smith; New Zealand	25.26w
400 metres	Mary Estelle Kapalu; Vanuatu	55.72	Sheryn Brodie; Australia	57.08	Seini Soroacagi; Fiji	57.49
800 metres	Andrea Williams; New Zealand	2:14.13	Nuree White; New Zealand	2:16.10	Karolina Tanono; Fiji	2:17.65
1500 metres	Sharon McKenzie; New Zealand	4:39.64	Vanessa Nikora; New Zealand	4:51.44	Salome Tabuatalei; Fiji	4:58.30
5000 metres	Nicola McDonald; New Zealand	18:03.37	Salome Tabuatalei; Fiji	18:42.83		
Half Marathon	Irene Wilson; New Zealand	1:25:38	Cathy Gabel; Australia	1:29:38	Alison McVie; Australia	1:37:33
100 metres hurdles (wind: +3.5 m/s)	Janiene Ashbridge; New Zealand	14.06w	Lillyanne Beining; Papua New Guinea	14.13w	Elizabeth Binns; New Zealand	14.76w
400 metres hurdles	Mary Estelle Kapalu; Vanuatu	61.70	Megan Merrilees; New Zealand	61.84	Megan Minehane; Australia	63.73
High jump	Carmen Hunter; Australia	1.77	Belinda Lavarack; Australia	1.74	Shelley Stoddart; New Zealand	1.74
Long jump	Frith Maunder; New Zealand	6.10	Shelley Stoddart; New Zealand	5.81w	Katie Ackerman; Australia	5.69w
Triple jump	Shelley Stoddart; New Zealand	12.50	Megan Minehane; Australia	11.71	Salanieta Tamani; Fiji	11.70
Shot put	Elizabeth Binns; New Zealand	13.08	Teresa Came; New Zealand	12.80	Marie-Chanelle Sako; New Caledonia	12.66
Discus throw	Geraldine Isaacs; New Zealand	40.02	Mague Taofifenua; New Caledonia	37.84	Romera Tabuavuni; Fiji	31.58
Hammer throw	Teresa Came; New Zealand	50.52	Miranda Winter; New Zealand	41.10	Linda Polelei; New Caledonia	29.82
Javelin throw (old implement)	Melissa Brearley; New Zealand	48.34	Bina Ramesh; New Caledonia	47.90	Linda Polelei; New Caledonia	44.50
10 Kilometres Road Walk	Monique Greenoff-Gaffney; Australia	57:09	Cherie Nelson; New Zealand	58:53		
4 x 100 metres relay	Fiji	47.10	Australia	48.62		
4 x 400 metres relay	New Zealand	3:54.14	Fiji	3:58.03	Australia	3:58.34

== Medal table (unofficial) ==
* Host nation (New Zealand)

Rank	Nation	Gold	Silver	Bronze	Total
1	New Zealand (NZL)*	27	17	4	48
2	Fiji (FIJ)	6	6	10	22
3	Australia (AUS)	3	9	14	26
4	French Polynesia (TAH)	3	2	2	7
5	Vanuatu (VAN)	2	1	0	3
6	New Caledonia (NCL)	0	4	4	8
7	Tonga (TON)	0	1	2	3
8	Papua New Guinea (PNG)	0	1	1	2
9	Norfolk Island (NFI)	0	0	1	1
Totals (9 entries)		41	41	38	120

== Participation (unofficial) ==
The participation of athletes from 15 countries could be determined from the Pacific Islands Athletics Statistics publication.

- American Samoa
- Australia
- Cook Islands
- Fiji
- New Caledonia
- New Zealand
- Niue
- Northern Mariana Islands
- Norfolk Island
- Papua New Guinea
- Samoa
- Solomon Islands
- (French Polynesia) /Tahiti
- Tonga
- Vanuatu
