= National records in athletics =

National records in athletics are the marks achieved by a nation's best athlete or athletes in a particular athletics event. These records are ratified by the respective national athletics governing body. A national record may also be the respective continental record (also called "area record" (AR)), or even the world record (WR) in that event.

== Record lists ==
The following articles list records for particular nations:

- Afghanistan
- Albania
- Algeria
- American Samoa
- Andorra
- Angola
- Anguilla
- Antigua and Barbuda
- Argentina
- Armenia
- Aruba
- Australia
- Austria
- Azerbaijan
- Bahamas
- Bahrain
- Bangladesh
- Barbados
- Belarus
- Belgium
- Belize
- Benin
- Bermuda
- Bhutan
- Bolivia
- Bosnia and Herzegovina
- Botswana
- Brazil
- British Virgin Islands
- Brunei
- Bulgaria
- Burkina Faso
- Burundi
- Cambodia
- Cameroon
- Canada
- Cape Verde
- Cayman Islands
- Central African Republic
- Chad
- Chile
- China
- Taiwan
- Colombia
- Comoros
- Democratic Republic of the Congo
- Republic of the Congo
- Cook Islands
- Costa Rica
- Croatia
- Cuba
- Cyprus
- Czech Republic
- Denmark
- Djibouti
- Dominica
- Dominican Republic
- East Timor
- Ecuador
- Egypt
- El Salvador
- Equatorial Guinea
- Eritrea
- Estonia
- Ethiopia
- Federated States of Micronesia
- Fiji
- Finland
- France
- French Polynesia
- Gabon
- Gambia
- Georgia
- Germany
- Ghana
- Gibraltar
- Greece
- Grenada
- Guam
- Guatemala
- Guinea
- Guinea-Bissau
- Guyana
- Haiti
- Honduras
- Hong Kong
- Hungary
- Iceland
- India
- Indonesia
- Iran
- Iraq
- Ireland
- Israel
- Italy
- Ivory Coast
- Jamaica
- Japan
- Jordan
- Kazakhstan
- Kenya
- Kiribati
- North Korea
- South Korea
- Kosovo
- Kyrgyzstan
- Kuwait
- Laos
- Latvia
- Lebanon
- Lesotho
- Liberia
- Libya
- Liechtenstein
- Lithuania
- Luxembourg
- Macau
- Madagascar
- Malawi
- Malaysia
- Maldives
- Mali
- Malta
- Marshall Islands
- Mauritania
- Mauritius
- Mexico
- Moldova
- Monaco
- Mongolia
- Montenegro
- Montserrat
- Morocco
- Mozambique
- Myanmar
- Namibia
- Nauru
- Nepal
- Netherlands
- Netherlands Antilles (Former member of IAAF)
- New Caledonia
- New Zealand
- Nicaragua
- Niger
- Nigeria
- Niue
- Norfolk Island
- Northern Mariana Islands
- North Macedonia
- Norway
- Oman
- Pakistan
- Palau
- Palestine
- Panama
- Papua New Guinea
- Paraguay
- Peru
- Philippines
- Poland
- Portugal
- Puerto Rico
- Qatar
- Romania
- Russia
- Rwanda
- Saint Kitts and Nevis
- Saint Lucia
- Saint Vincent and the Grenadines
- Samoa
- San Marino
- São Tomé and Príncipe
- Saudi Arabia
- Senegal
- Serbia
- Seychelles
- Sierra Leone
- Singapore
- Slovakia
- Slovenia
- Solomon Islands
- Somalia
- South Africa
- South Sudan
- Spain
- Sri Lanka
- Sudan
- Suriname
- Eswatini
- Sweden
- Switzerland
- Syria
- Tajikistan
- Tanzania
- Thailand
- Togo
- Tonga
- Trinidad and Tobago
- Tunisia
- Turkey
- Turkmenistan
- Turks and Caicos Islands
- Tuvalu
- Uganda
- Ukraine
- United Arab Emirates
- United Kingdom
- United States
- United States Virgin Islands
- Uruguay
- Uzbekistan
- Vanuatu
- Venezuela
- Vietnam
- Yemen
- Zambia
- Zimbabwe

== See also ==
- National records in the marathon
