= 1998 Oceania Athletics Championships =

IV Oceania Athletics Championships
- Dates: August 27–28
- Host city: Nuku'alofa, Tonga
- Venue: Teufaiva Stadium
- Level: Senior
- Events: 39 (21 men, 18 women)
- Participation: 15 nations
- Records set: 8

The 1998 Oceania Athletics Championships were held at the Teufaiva Stadium in Nuku'alofa, Tonga, between August 27–28, 1998.

A total of 39 events were contested, 21 by men and 18 by women.

== Medal summary ==
Medal winners were published. Complete results can be found as compiled by Bob Snow from Athletics PNG.

=== Men ===
Event	Gold		Silver		Bronze	
100 metres (wind: -0.3 m/s)	Peter Pulu; Papua New Guinea	10.70	Gene Pateman; New Zealand	10.82	Tuluta'u Koula; Tonga	10.84
200 metres (wind: +3.5 m/s)	Peter Pulu; Papua New Guinea	21.22w	Gene Pateman; New Zealand	21.32w	Laurence Jack; Vanuatu	21.92w
400 metres	Jeffrey Bai; Papua New Guinea	48.36	Rusiate Matai; Fiji	50.26	Mark Gunther; Australia	51.06
800 metres	Mark Gunther; Australia	1:56.58	Sisari Vakasuka; Fiji	1:56.96	Selwyn Kole; Solomon Islands	1:57.32
1500 metres	Peter Paul Enkae; Vanuatu	4:08.84	Selwyn Kole; Solomon Islands	4:09.60	David Kanie; Papua New Guinea	4:11.02
5000 metres	David Kanie; Papua New Guinea	15:43.30	Peter Paul Enkae; Vanuatu	16:15.08	Andrew Keane; Australia	16:44.94
10000 metres	David Kanie; Papua New Guinea	33:21.19	Niteshwar Prasad; Fiji	38:32.50		
3000 metres steeplechase	Medley Laban; Papua New Guinea	10:03.48	Sisari Vakasuka; Fiji	10:56.82	Niteshwar Prasad; Fiji	11:55.14
110 metres hurdles (wind: +1.5 m/s)	Ivan Wakit; Papua New Guinea	15.10 CR	Taniela Lolohea; Tonga	15.12	Sesi Salt; Tonga	16.42
400 metres hurdles	Ivan Wakit; Papua New Guinea	55.98	Taniela Lolohea; Tonga	58.08	Sesi Salt; Tonga	60.20
High jump	Benetti Schwalger; Samoa	1.95	Robert Elder; Fiji	1.95	Damien Daly; Australia	1.90
Pole vault	Tokaikolo Latapu; Tonga	3.00				
Long jump	Gene Pateman; New Zealand	7.13	Edward Bai; Papua New Guinea	6.43	Benetti Schwalger; Samoa	6.40
Triple jump	Edward Bai; Papua New Guinea	12.76				
Shot put	Tristan Mave; New Zealand	15.06	Kevin Galea; Australia	14.29	Mitchel Alatalo; Australia	13.91
Discus throw	Tristan Mave; New Zealand	46.58	Charles Winchester; Cook Islands	43.13	Kevin Galea; Australia	40.16
Hammer throw	Brentt Jones; Norfolk Island	53.50	Daniel Goulding; Australia	52.18	Charles Winchester; Cook Islands	40.15
Javelin throw	Andrew Ratawa; Fiji	66.94	Sean Betland; Australia	60.00	Joshua Kuruyawa; Fiji	57.06
10 Kilometres Road Walk	Dip Chand; Fiji	54:41	Pradeep Chand; Fiji	62:49	Manohar Maharaj; Fiji	66:07
4 x 100 metres relay	Papua New Guinea; Allan Akia; Jeffrey Bai; Edwin Bai; Peter Pulu	42.22	Palau	44.56	Tonga	44.64
4 x 400 metres relay	Papua New Guinea; Ivan Wakit; Jeffrey Bai; Peter Pulu; Edwin Bai	3:22.84	Australia	3:26.30	Solomon Islands	3:27.38

=== Women ===
Event	Gold		Silver		Bronze	
100 metres (wind: +1.0 m/s)	Nicola Kidd; New Zealand	12.22	Siulolo Liku; Tonga	12.36	Kelera Nacewa; New Zealand	12.62
200 metres (wind: +2.0 m/s)	Anita Sutherland; New Zealand	23.74 CR	Marissa Stephen; New Zealand	24.50	Jennene Hansen; Australia	25.26
400 metres	Marissa Stephen; New Zealand	54.60 CR	Mary Estelle Kapalu; Vanuatu	55.06	Jennene Hansen; Australia	57.14
800 metres	Salome Tabuatalei; Fiji	2:21.44	Mary Estelle Kapalu; Vanuatu	2:23.94		
1500 metres	Salome Tabuatalei; Fiji	4:50.52	Rebecca Rider; Australia	4:53.88	Rosemary Omundsen; Papua New Guinea	5:14.26
5000 metres	Rebecca Rider; Australia	18:06.84	Salome Tabuatalei; Fiji	18:56.78	Rosemary Omundsen; Papua New Guinea	19:28.46
100 metres hurdles (wind: -0.3 m/s)	Nicola Kidd; New Zealand	14.36 CR	Siulolo Liku; Tonga	14.46	Anita Sutherland; New Zealand	14.82
400 metres hurdles	Nicola Kidd; New Zealand	58.80 CR	Mary Estelle Kapalu; Vanuatu	61.10		
High jump	Vicki Collins; Australia	1.70	Angela Way; Papua New Guinea	1.60		
Long jump	Siulolo Liku; Tonga	6.01	Kelera Nacewa; New Zealand	5.69	Marica Likulawedua; Fiji	5.32
Triple jump	Kelera Nacewa; New Zealand	12.48	Sarah Sydney; Australia	12.10	Angela Way; Papua New Guinea	11.30
Shot put	Maria Disolokai; Fiji	13.86 CR	Victoria Lowrie; New Zealand	13.10	Ana Niumataiwalu; Fiji	10.94
Discus throw	Maria Disolokai; Fiji	40.75	Helen Wallis; Australia	40.50	Belinda King; New Zealand	39.76
Hammer throw	Belinda King; New Zealand	49.60	Michelle Phillips; New Zealand	46.42	Sharyn Tennent; Australia	45.79
Javelin throw (old implement)	Tiffany Dudman; Australia	42.87	Maria Disolokai; Fiji	41.49	Ariane Lusia Hema; Tonga	40.28
10 Kilometres Road Walk	Angela Keogh; Norfolk Island	58:00				
4 x 100 metres relay	New Zealand; Marissa Stephen; Nicola Kidd; Anita Sutherland; Kelera Nacewa	47.02 CR	Papua New Guinea; Alle Gagole; Della Marava; Angela Way; Monica Jonathan	49.08	Australia	49.08
4 x 400 metres relay	New Zealand; Marissa Stephen; Nicola Kidd; Anita Sutherland; Kirsty Turnbull	3:51.14 CR	Australia	4:14.20		

== Medal table (unofficial) ==
* Host nation (Tonga)

Rank	Nation	Gold	Silver	Bronze	Total
1	New Zealand (NZL)	12	6	3	21
2	Papua New Guinea (PNG)	11	3	4	18
3	Fiji (FIJ)	6	8	5	19
4	Australia (AUS)	4	8	9	21
5	Tonga (TON)*	2	4	5	11
6	Norfolk Island (NFK)	2	0	0	2
7	Vanuatu (VAN)	1	4	1	6
8	Samoa (SAM)	1	0	1	2
9	Solomon Islands (SOL)	0	1	2	3
10	Cook Islands (COK)	0	1	1	2
11	Palau (PLW)	0	1	0	1
Totals (11 entries)		39	36	31	106

== Participation (unofficial) ==
The participation of athletes from 15 countries was reported by the Pacific Islands Athletics Statistics publication.

- Australia
- Cook Islands
- Fiji
- Kiribati
- Federated States of Micronesia
- Nauru
- New Zealand
- Norfolk Island
- Palau
- Papua New Guinea
- Samoa
- Solomon Islands
- (French Polynesia) /Tahiti
- Tonga
- Vanuatu
