= Athletics at the 1999 South Pacific Games =

Athletics at the XI South Pacific Games
- Dates: June 3–11
- Host city: Santa Rita, Guam
- Level: Senior
- Events: 45 (23 men, 22 women)
- Participation: 19 nations

Athletics competitions at the 1999 South Pacific Games were held in Santa Rita, Guam, between June 3–11, 1999.

A total of 45 events were contested, 23 by men and 22 by women.

== Medal summary ==
Medal winners and their results were published on the Athletics Weekly webpage courtesy of Tony Isaacs and Børre Lilloe, and on the Oceania Athletics Association webpage by Bob Snow.

Complete results can also be found on the Oceania Athletics Association. and on the Athletics PNG webpages, both also compiled by Bob Snow.

=== Men ===
Event	Gold		Silver		Bronze	
100 metres (wind: -1.1 m/s)	Moave Vu (FIJ)	10.73	Saula Roko (FIJ)	10.78	Jone Delai (FIJ)	10.79
200 metres	Aminiasi Babitu (FIJ)	21.50	Roman Cress (MHL)	21.89	Varo Varo (PNG)	21.99
400 metres	Aminiasi Babitu (FIJ)	46.88	Jeffrey Bai (PNG)	47.15	Clement Abai (PNG)	47.41
800 metres	Isireli Naikelekelevesi (FIJ)	1:49.54 GR	Clement Abai (PNG)	1:51.13	Savenaca Lutumailagi (FIJ)	1:51.37
1500 metres	Isireli Naikelekelevesi (FIJ)	3:59.01	Anthony Quan (GUM)	4:00.15	Neil Weare (GUM)	4:01.90
5000 metres	(French Polynesia) /Georges Richmond (TAH)	15:14.97	Brent Butler (GUM)	15:32.13	Primo Higa (SOL)	15:41.65
10000 metres	(French Polynesia) /Georges Richmond (TAH)	32:37.64	Brent Butler (GUM)	33:06.87	Primo Higa (SOL)	33:29.57
Marathon	(French Polynesia) /Georges Richmond (TAH)	2:32:08	(French Polynesia) /Jacky Brillant (TAH)	2:43:52	(French Polynesia) /Tutea Degage (TAH)	2:46:42
3000 metres steeplechase	Primo Higa (SOL)	9:38.60	Tawai Keiruan (VAN)	9:45.23	Morris Manai (PNG)	9:49.23
110 metres hurdles (wind: -1.0 m/s)	Jovesa Naivalu (FIJ)	14.32 GR	Avele Tanielu (SAM)	14.76	Joseph Rodan II (FIJ)	14.83
400 metres hurdles	Ivan Wakit (PNG)	51.47 GR	Jovesa Naivalu (FIJ)	51.67	Mowen Boino (PNG)	52.81
High jump	Stéphane Gouberaite (NCL)	2.05	Lorima Vunisa (FIJ)	2.02	Nathan Sua'mene (SAM)	2.02
Pole vault	Jean-Bernard Harper (NCL)	4.55	(French Polynesia) /Thibaut Cattiau (TAH)	4.45	Christil Guiot (NCL)	4.35
Long jump	Frédéric Erin (NCL)	7.45 (wind: +0.2 m/s) GR	Gabriele Qoro (FIJ)	7.29 (wind: 0.0 m/s)	Cédric Obertan (NCL)	7.19 (wind: +0.6 m/s)
Triple jump	Frédéric Erin (NCL)	15.44 (wind: 1.3 m/s)	(French Polynesia) /Apolosi Foliaki (TAH)	14.86 w (wind: +2.4 m/s)	Joseph Prasad (FIJ)	14.61 (wind: +1.6 m/s)
Shot put	Rocky Vaitanaki (NCL)	17.30	Jean-Pierre Totélé (NCL)	16.22	(Wallis and Futuna) /Aukusitino Hoatau (WLF)	15.78
Discus throw	Jean-Pierre Totélé (NCL)	51.87	Daniel Kilama (NCL)	48.98	(Wallis and Futuna) /Aukusitino Hoatau (WLF)	47.67
Hammer throw	Laurent Pakihivatau (NCL)	60.26	Soane Lakafia (NCL)	54.06	Brentt Jones (NFK)	53.84
Javelin throw	James Goulding (FIJ)	74.13	(Wallis and Futuna) /Vitolio Tipotio (WLF)	73.01	(Wallis and Futuna) /Fapiano Liufai (WLF)	70.61
Decathlon	Joseph Rodan II (FIJ)	6343	Sekona Vi (TGA)	6044	(French Polynesia) /Hendrey Ah Tchoy (TAH)	5811
20 Kilometres Road Walk	Dip Chand (FIJ)	1:55:18	Pradeep Chand (FIJ)	1:59:33	Manohar Maharaj (FIJ)	2:15:03
4 x 100 metres relay	Fiji; Moave Vu; Anare Ragiagia; Saula Roko; Jone Delai	40.48	Papua New Guinea; Elias Roboam; Alan Akia; Junias Irima; Varo Varo	41.28	New Caledonia	41.86
4 x 400 metres relay	Fiji; Henry Rogo Semiti; Aminiasi Babitu; Remesio Namara; Savenaca Lutumailagi	3:09.76	Papua New Guinea; Clement Abai; Mowen Boino; Elias Roboam; Ivan Wakit	3:14.47	(French Polynesia) /Tahiti	3:20.62

=== Women ===
Event	Gold		Silver		Bronze	
100 metres (wind: -0.7 m/s)	Litiana Miller (FIJ)	11.92 GR	Josivini Maria (FIJ)	12.21	Siulolo Liku (TGA)	12.27
200 metres (wind: -2.2 m/s)	Laurence Upigit (NCL)	24.88	Litiana Miller (FIJ)	25.04	Mary Estelle Kapalu (VAN)	25.16
400 metres	Mary Estelle Kapalu (VAN)	54.30 GR	Ann Mooney (PNG)	56.91	Helen Muga (PNG)	57.44
800 metres	Karolina Tanono (FIJ)	2:16.76	Mary Estelle Kapalu (VAN)	2:18.33	Ann Mooney (PNG)	2:19.92
1500 metres	Salome Tabuatalei (FIJ)	4:56.00	Debbie Cardenas (GUM)	4:57.71	Lily-Beth Hunai (VAN)	4:59.49
5000 metres	(French Polynesia) /Teroro Meyer (TAH)	18:46.35 GR	Salome Tabuatalei (FIJ)	18:47.78	Debbie Cardenas (GUM)	18:48.21
10000 metres	Salome Tabuatalei (FIJ)	40:38.83	Annick Robin (NCL)	40:41.73	Nadia Malki (NCL)	40:50.17
Marathon	(French Polynesia) /Laure-Hina Grepin (TAH)	3:15:11	Susan Seay (GUM)	3:15:52	Annick Robin (NCL)	3:18:17
100 metres hurdles (wind: -0.5 m/s)	Siulolo Liku (TGA)	14.35	(French Polynesia) /Véronique Boyer (TAH)	14.85	(French Polynesia) /Albertine Teriierooiterai (An) (TAH)	15.10
400 metres hurdles	Mary Estelle Kapalu (VAN)	58.90 GR	Apikali Kainoco (FIJ)	62.25	Laisa Dibuka (FIJ)	63.56
High jump	Angela Way (PNG)	1.76	Laurence Upigit (NCL)	1.76	(French Polynesia) /Véronique Boyer (TAH)	1.61
Pole vault	Iowana Vakaloloma (FIJ)	2.40 GR	Wakalane Boula (NCL)	2.40 GR	Rosemai Poilagi (NCL)	2.40 GR
Long jump	Siulolo Liku (TGA)	5.99 (wind: -0.3 m/s) GR	Laurence Upigit (NCL)	5.90 (wind: 0.0 m/s)	(French Polynesia) /Véronique Boyer (TAH)	5.54 (wind: -0.1 m/s)
Triple jump	Laurence Upigit (NCL)	12.95 (wind: +0.4 m/s) GR	(French Polynesia) /Véronique Boyer (TAH)	12.36 (wind: 0.0 m/s)	Siulolo Liku (TGA)	11.86 (wind: -0.4 m/s)
Shot put	Lisa Misipeka (ASA)	15.13 GR	Maria Disolokai (FIJ)	14.49	Pamela Ferland (NCL)	13.37
Discus throw	Lisa Misipeka (ASA)	46.00	Melehifo Uhi (TGA)	44.33	Marie-Christine Fakaté (NCL)	43.93
Hammer throw	Lisa Misipeka (ASA)	63.39 GR	Pamela Ferland (NCL)	48.22	Patricia Suta (NCL)	42.72
Javelin throw (current design)	Linda Polelei (NCL)	48.82 GR	Rosemai Poilagi (NCL)	46.14	Sisilia Lau (FIJ)	44.62
Heptathlon	(French Polynesia) /Véronique Boyer (TAH)	4523	Lata Manoa (TGA)	4215	Apikali Kainoco (FIJ)	4090
20 Kilometres Road Walk	Angela Keogh (NFK)	1:58:32 GR	Deepika Chand (FIJ)	2:48:25		
4 x 100 metres relay	New Caledonia	47.85	Papua New Guinea; Helen Muga; Monica Jonathon; Mary Unido; Della Marava	47.93	Tonga	48.72
4 x 400 metres relay	Papua New Guinea; Helen Muga; Monica Jonathon; Mary Unido; Anne Mooney	3:55.96	New Caledonia	4:01.96	(French Polynesia) /Tahiti	4:04.19

== Medal table (unofficial) ==
The medal table was published.

* Host nation (Guam)

Rank	Nation	Gold	Silver	Bronze	Total
1	Fiji (FIJ)	16	11	8	35
2	New Caledonia (NCL)	11	10	9	30
3	French Polynesia (TAH)	6	5	7	18
4	Papua New Guinea (PNG)	3	6	6	15
5	American Samoa (ASA)	3	0	0	3
6	Tonga (TON)	2	3	3	8
7	Vanuatu (VAN)	2	2	2	6
8	Solomon Islands (SOL)	1	0	2	3
9	Norfolk Island (NFK)	1	0	1	2
10	Guam (GUM)*	0	5	2	7
11	Wallis and Futuna (WLF)	0	1	3	4
12	Samoa (SAM)	0	1	1	2
13	Marshall Islands (MHL)	0	1	0	1
Totals (13 entries)		45	45	44	134

== Participation (unofficial) ==
Athletes from the following 19 countries were reported to participate:

- American Samoa
- Cook Islands
- Fiji
- Guam
- Kiribati
- Marshall Islands
- Federated States of Micronesia
- Nauru
- New Caledonia
- Norfolk Island
- Northern Mariana Islands
- Palau
- Papua New Guinea
- Samoa
- Solomon Islands
- (French Polynesia) /Tahiti
- Tonga
- Vanuatu
- /Wallis and Futuna
