= Subul Babo =

Papua New Guinean sprinter

Personal information
- Nationality: Papua New Guinean
- Born: 1 June 1966 (age 59)

Sport
- Sport: Sprinting
- Event: 400 metres

Subul Babo (born 1 June 1966) is a Papua New Guinean sprinter. He competed in the 400 metres at the 1992 Summer Olympics and the 1996 Summer Olympics.

Babo won a gold medal in the 200 m and silver in the 100 m at the 1990 Oceania Athletics Championships.

In athletics at the 1991 South Pacific Games, Babo won three gold medals in the 400 m, 4 x 100 m, and 4 x 400 m, in addition to a 200 m bronze. He repeated his 4 x 400 m gold in athletics at the 1995 South Pacific Games, winning silver in the 400 m and 4 x 400 m. In athletics at the 1993 South Pacific Mini Games, Babo won four silver medals in the 100 m, 200 m, and both relays, followed by winning silvers in the relays at the 1997 Games.

As of 2014, Babo is a sprints coach of the Athletics Papua New Guinea national team.
