= List of New Caledonian records in athletics =

The following are the records in athletics in New Caledonia maintained by New Caledonia's national athletics association: Ligue de la Nouvelle Calédonie d'Athlétisme (LNCA).

== Outdoor ==
Key to tables: Awaiting ratification Record not kept by LNCA Not ratified or later rescinded by LNCA

# = not ratified by federation

=== Men ===
Event	Record	Athlete	Date	Meet	Place	Ref.
100 m	10.70 (+1.2 m/s)	Paul Zongo	18 July 2008		Vénissieux, France	
100 m	10.70 (+0.4 m/s)	Paul Zongo	24 July 2009		Angers, France	
100 m	10.4 h	Stéphane Forest	27 September 1986			
200 m	21.70	Joseph Wéjièmé	6 August 1975	South Pacific Games	Tumon, Guam	
200 m	21.7 h	Joseph Wéjièmé	16 July 1975			
200 m	21.7 h	Stéphane Forest	4 October 1986			
200 m	21.7 h	Mickael Tafilagi	16 November 1990			
400 m	49.11	Fréderic Erin	13 May 2011		Nouméa, New Caledonia	
400 m	48.8 h	Fréderic Erin	18 February 2000		Hamilton, New Zealand	
800 m	1:49.8	Adrien Kela	26 February 2011	LNCA Competition	Nouméa, New Caledonia	
1000 m	2:26.08	Adrien Kela	16 October 2010	3rd Nouméa International Meet	Nouméa, New Caledonia	
1500 m	3:50.27	Alain Lazare	14 December 1987	South Pacific Games	Nouméa, New Caledonia	
Mile	4:28.30	Nordine Benfodda	4 September 2008		Nouméa, New Caledonia	
2000 m	5:38.6 h	Nordine Benfodda	16 May 2008		Nouméa, New Caledonia	
3000 m	8:13.2 h	Alain Lazare	6 October 1979		Nouméa, New Caledonia	
5000 m	14:09.2 h (Note: 14:09.02 by other sources)	Alain Lazare	23 May 1987		Nouméa, New Caledonia	
5000 m	14:15.12	Alain Lazare	15 December 1987	South Pacific Games	Nouméa, New Caledonia	
10,000 m	29:13.0 h	Alain Lazare	7 July 1979		Nouméa, New Caledonia	
10 km (road)	31:19	Thomas Prono	24 July 2005		Bourail, New Caledonia	
One hour	18019 m	Alain Lazare	22 May 1976			
20,000 m (track)	1:07:43	Alain Lazare	21 September 1975			
Half marathon	1:02:44	Alain Lazare	19 May 1985		Huntly, New Zealand	
25,000 m (track)	1:26:38+	Denis Alcade	30 September 1978			
30,000 m (track)	1:44:46	Denis Alcade	30 September 1978			
Marathon	2:11:59	Alain Lazare	12 February 1984		Tokyo, Japan	
Marathon	2:12:24	Alain Lazare	30 April 1988		Huy, Belgium	
110 m hurdles	14.86 (−1.5 m/s)	Albert Chambonnier	17 September 1991	South Pacific Games	Port Moresby, Papua New Guinea	
110 m hurdles	14.1 h	Albert Chambonnier	12 September 1990			
400 m hurdles	53.03	Edmond Humuni	16 December 1987	South Pacific Games	Nouméa, New Caledonia	
3000 m steeplechase	8:54.1 h	Alain Lazare	28 November 1987		Nouméa, New Caledonia	
High jump	2.21 m	Paul Poaniewa	31 August 1979	South Pacific Games	Suva, Fiji	
High jump	2.26 m #	Paul Poaniewa	29 June 1975		Saint-Étienne, France	
Pole vault	5.30 m	Eric Reuillard	18 February 2005		Bressuire, France	
Pole vault	5.30 m	Eric Reuillard	4 December 2004		Nouméa, New Caledonia	
Long jump	8.12 m (+1.9 m/s)	Frédéric Erin	7 September 2011	Pacific Games	Nouméa, New Caledonia	
Triple jump	16.13 m (+0.9 m/s)	Yannick Talon	23 September 1976		Nouméa, New Caledonia	
Shot put	18.52 m	Arnjolt Beer	28 August 1971	South Pacific Games	Pirae, French Polynesia	
Shot put	19.76 m #	Arnjolt Beer	2 October 1998		Paris, France	
Discus throw	62.13 m	Bertrand Vili	19 December 2007		Auckland, New Zealand	
Discus throw	63.66 m #	Bertrand Vili	27 March 2007		Wellington, New Zealand	
Hammer throw	63.00 m	Pierre-Chanel Sao	23 September 1989			
Hammer throw	65.04 m	Pierre-Chanel Sao	4 May 1990		Saint-Ouen, France	
Javelin throw	79.05 m	Joachim Keiteau	14 July 2002		Saint-Étienne, France	
Javelin throw	82.39 m #	Gaetan Siakinuu-Schmidt	14 July 2002		Saint-Étienne, France	
Weight throw	17.41 m	Topie Suve	9 April 1988			
Decathlon	6867 pts	Eric Reuillard	16–17 May 2008		Nouméa, New Caledonia	
Decathlon	100m / Long jump / Shot put / High jump / 400m / 110m H / Discus / Pole vault / Javelin / 1500m; 11.2 / 6.80 m / 12.82 m / 1.90 m / 52.1 / 15.2 / 35.16 m / 4.80 m / 48.70 m / 4:51.6					
Decathlon	7354 pts	Florian Geffrouais	13–14 December 2017	Pacific Mini Games	Port Vila, Vanuatu	
Decathlon	100m / Long jump / Shot put / High jump / 400m / 110m H / Discus / Pole vault / Javelin / 1500m; 11.53 (−0.8 m/s) / 7.14 m (−1.2 m/s) / 14.15 m / 1.90 m / 50.20 / 15.43 (−1.9 m/s) / 41.50 m / 4.40 m / 49.59 m / 4:37.30					
5000 m walk (track)	24:10.0	François Bogliolo	5 November 1997			
10,000 m walk (track)	47:19.0+	François Bogliolo	17 April 1999			
One hour walk (track)	12743 m	François Bogliolo	17 April 1999			
20,000 m walk (track)	1:42:1+	François Bogliolo	25 October 1997			
20 km walk (road)	1:42:01 #	François Bogliolo	16 December 1987		Nouméa, New Caledonia	
Two hours walk (track)	23488 m	François Bogliolo	25 October 1997			
50 km walk (road)						
4 × 100 m relay	41.07	New Caledonia; Christophe Simonin; Remy Chenu; Rudy Brizard; Jean Fantozzi	16 December 1987	South Pacific Games	Nouméa, New Caledonia	
4 × 400 m relay	1:31.9	ASM Club Team	12 November 1975			
4 × 400 m relay	3:20.36	New Caledonia; Alain Julien; Yannick Blanc; Philippe Berger; Daniel Dumain	8 September 1979	South Pacific Games	Suva, Fiji	
4 × 800 m relay	8:17.0	ASLN Club Team	30 June 1976			
4 × 1500 m relay	17:10.8	JSVDT Club Team	19 October 1977			
Ekiden relay	2:26:54	JSVDT Club Team	26 September 2004		Dumbéa, New Caledonia	

=== Women ===
Event	Record	Athlete	Date	Meet	Place	Ref.
100 m	12.04 (+1.9 m/s)	Ghislaine Saint Prix	9 July 1988		Créteil, France	
100 m	11.7 (+1.5 m/s) (ht)	Ghislaine Saint Prix	10 August 1991		Nouméa, New Caledonia	
200 m	24.60	Brigitte Hardel	11 July 1976		Colombes, France	
200 m	24.4 h	Laurence Upigit	22 April 2000		Suva, Fiji	
400 m	54.65	Brigitte Hardel	25 September 1986		Nouméa, New Caledonia	
800 m	2:13.55	Nadie Bernard-Prasad	11 December 1993	South Pacific Mini Games	Port Vila, Vanuatu	
1000 m	2:58.9 h	Nadie Bernard-Prasad	16 May 1987		Nouméa, New Caledonia	
1500 m	4:26.6 h (Note: 4:26.06 by other sources)	Nadie Bernard-Prasad	4 December 1993		Brisbane, Australia	
Mile	5:23.90	Marie-Pierre Hoffman	4 October 2008		Nouméa, New Caledonia	
3000 m	9:09.44	Nadie Bernard-Prasad	4 July 1994		Saint-Cloud, France	
5000 m	17:44.2 h	Nadie Bernard-Prasad	13 July 1994		Nouméa, New Caledonia	
10,000 m	32:24.96	Nadie Bernard-Prasad	13 July 1994		Saint-Maur-des-Fossés, France	
10 km (road)	31:38	Nadie Bernard-Prasad	16 April 1994		Chula Vista, United States	
15 km (road)	50:44	Nadie Bernard-Prasad	1 October 1990		Montbéliard, France	
Half marathon	1:09:05	Nadie Bernard-Prasad	6 September 2011		Las Vegas, United States	
Marathon	2:29:48	Nadie Bernard-Prasad	5 March 1995		Los Angeles, United States	
100 km (road)	9:19:53	Marie-José Berthet	15 May 1999		Chavagne, France	
100 m hurdles	14.44 (+0.5 m/s)	Lucie Turpin	9 May 2015	Oceania Championships	Cairns, Australia	
100 m hurdles	14.2^{†} (−0.7 m/s) (ht)	Ghislaine Saint Prix	15 December 1987	South Pacific Games	Nouméa, New Caledonia	
400 m hurdles	1:00.96	Brigitte Hardel	16 December 1987	South Pacific Games	Nouméa, New Caledonia	
3000 m steeplechase	11:53.96	Isabelle Oblet	6 September 2011	Pacific Games	Nouméa, New Caledonia	
High jump	1.76 m	Laurence Upigit	5 June 1999	South Pacific Games	Santa Rita, Guam	
Pole vault	4.00 m	Pascale Gacon	9 July 2010		Valence, France	
Long jump	6.24 m	Brigitte Hardel	24 September 1982		Nouméa, New Caledonia	
Triple jump	12.95 m (+0.4 m/s)	Laurence Upigit	8 June 1996	South Pacific Games	Santa Rita, Guam	
Shot put	14.41 m	Marie-Rose Tuitagata	24 February 1988		Auckland, New Zealand	
Shot put	14.53 m	Ashley Bologna	11 December 2017	Pacific Mini Games	Port Vila, Vanuatu	
Shot put	15.08 m	Ashley Bologna	12 January 2019 (Note: by IAAF source, 12 January by meet source, probably false)		Christchurch, New Zealand	
Shot put	16.07 m	Ashley Bologna	12 January 2019 (Note: by IAAF source, 12 January by meet source, probably false)		Christchurch, New Zealand	
Shot put	16.31 m	Ashley Bologna	12 January 2019 (Note: by IAAF source, 12 January by meet source, probably false)		Christchurch, New Zealand	
Discus throw	52.42 m	Marie-Christine Fakaté	12 September 1989		Tours, France	
Hammer throw	54.08 m	Elise Takosi	13 June 2011		Colmar, France	
Javelin throw	57.32 m	Linda Selui	6 September 2011	Pacific Games	Nouméa, New Caledonia	
Weight throw	15.56 m	Pamela Ferland	12 January 1991		Nouméa, New Caledonia	
Heptathlon	5331 pts	Brigitte Hardel	8–9 October 1982		Nouméa, New Caledonia	
Heptathlon	100m H / High jump / Shot put / 200m / Long jump / Javelin / 800m					
5000 m walk (track)	35:08.5 h	Marguerite Douepere	5 September 1981		Nouméa, New Caledonia	
10,000 m walk (track)	1:21:46	Marguerite Douepere	10 October 1981		Nouméa, New Caledonia	
20 km walk (road)						
4 × 100 m relay	47.32	New Caledonia; Laure Uedre; Corinne Martin; Brigitte Hardel; Ghislaine Saint Prix	16 December 1987	South Pacific Games	Nouméa, New Caledonia	
4 × 200 m relay	1:51.12	ASM Club Team; Missote; Belareberdierre; Pimbe; Dabome	6 November 1974		Nouméa, New Caledonia	
4 × 400 m relay	3:52.58	New Caledonia; Catherine Uedre; Patricia Rouby; Véronique Becker; Brigitte Hardel	18 December 1987	South Pacific Games	Nouméa, New Caledonia	
4 × 800 m relay	10:45.9 h	ASLN Club Team; Branchu; Lemaire; Perdriat; Mindia	30 June 1976			
Ekiden relay	3:00:13	ASPTT Club Team	1 July 2007		Dumbéa, New Caledonia	

^{†}: did not finish by another source

== Indoor ==
=== Men ===
Event	Record	Athlete	Date	Meet	Place	Ref.
50 m	5.98	Paul Zongo	12 February 2002		Paris, France	
50 m	5.97 #	Paul Zongo	23 February 2008		Paris, France	
60 m	6.92	Paul Zongo	12 February 2005		Paris, France	
60 m	6.9 h	Paul Zongo	19 January 2008		Bordeaux, France	
200 m						
400 m						
800 m						
1500 m	4:15.53	Cedric Oblet	16 January 2011		Reims, France	
Mile	4:20.7 h	Gregory Canaldo	12 March 2004		Nouméa, New Caledonia	
3000 m						
60 m hurdles						
High jump	2.21 m	Paul Poaniewa	3/4 February 1979		Paris, France	
Pole vault	5.30 m	Eric Reuillard	18 February 2005		Liévin, France	
Long jump	7.20 m	Cedric Obertan	20/21 February 1999		Paris, France	
Triple jump	14.93 m	Cedric Obertan	18 February 2000		Liévin, France	
Shot put	19.10 m	Arnjolt Beer	19 February 1972		Paris, France	
Heptathlon						
Heptathlon	60m / Long jump / Shot put / High jump / 60m H / Pole vault / 1000m					
5000 m walk						
4 × 400 m relay						

=== Women ===
Event	Record	Athlete	Date	Meet	Place	Ref.
60 m	7.90	Yannick Gacon	19 February 1983		Paris, France	
200 m						
400 m						
800 m						
1500 m	5:13.26	Isabelle Oblet	8 January 2011		Reims, France	
3000 m						
60 m hurdles						
High jump						
Pole vault						
Long jump	6.28 m	Brigitte Hardel	20 February 1983		Bordeaux, France	
Triple jump	12.57 m	Yannick Gacon-Becker	27/28 February 1993		Liévin, France	
Shot put	15.43 m	Ashley Bologna	24 February 2018	French U20 Championships	Val-de-Reuil, France	
Shot put	16.78 m	Ashley Bologna	16 February 2019	French Championships	Miramas, France	
Pentathlon						
Pentathlon	60m H / High jump / Shot put / Long jump / 800m					
3000 m walk						
4 × 400 m relay						
