= Jovesa Naivalu =

Fijian athlete & US international rugby union player (born 1978)

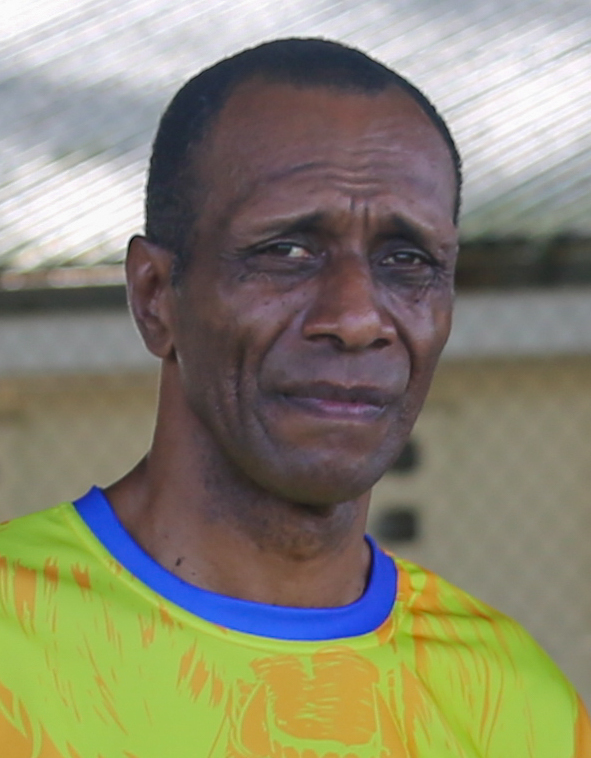
- Jovesa Naivalu in 2022

Personal information
- Born: Jovesa Seuseu Naivalu; 19 March 1978 (age 48) Lautoka, Fiji
- Height: 1.93 m (6 ft 4 in)
- Weight: 63 kg (9 st 13 lb)

Sport
- Country: Fiji
- Sport: Track and Field
- Event(s): 110 metres hurdles, 400 metres hurdles

Achievements and titles
- Personal best(s): 110 m hurdles: 13.82 (NR); 400 m hurdles: 51.67 (NR)
Medal record
Men's athletics
Representing Fiji
World Junior Championships
Bronze medal – third place	1996 Sydney	110 m hurdles
(South) Pacific Games
Gold medal – first place	2003 Suva	110 m hurdles
Gold medal – first place	1999 Santa Rita	110 m hurdles
Silver medal – second place	2007 Apia	110 m hurdles
Silver medal – second place	2003 Suva	400 m hurdles
Silver medal – second place	2003 Suva	4x400 m relay
Silver medal – second place	1999 Santa Rita	400 m hurdles
(South) Pacific Mini Games
Gold medal – first place	1997 Pago Pago	110 m hurdles
Gold medal – first place	1997 Pago Pago	400 m hurdles
Bronze medal – third place	1997 Pago Pago	Triple jump
- Updated on 28 April 2013

Jovesa Seuseu "Jojo" Naivalu (born 19 March 1978) is a Fiji-American athlete. In the sport of athletics, Naivalu is the Fiji national record holder in both the 110 metres hurdles and the 400 metres hurdles. He represented Fiji at the 1996 Summer Olympics and the 1996 World Junior Championships in Athletics in the 110 metres hurdles.

In the sport of rugby union he represented the United States from 2000 to 2004 winning 10 caps. He also represented the United States in rugby sevens. During the 2008/09 season he played for Frankfurt SC in the Rugby-Bundesliga in Germany, making 15 appearances for the club.

== Biography ==
Naivalu was born 19 March 1978 in Lautoka, Fiji. Naivalu moved to the United States in 1986. He competed for Fremont High School in Sunnyvale, California, winning the 110 metres hurdles at the CIF California State Meet in 1995 and 1996.

Naivalu was selected to the small Fiji 1996 Olympic team that year. The Olympic hurdles are 3" higher than they are in high school. Naivalu finished 6th in his qualifying heat in the 110 metres hurdles. Running hurdles he was used to, a month later he took a bronze medal at the IAAF World Junior Championships in Athletics. The following year, he set the Fijian national record of 13.82 (+0.3) in the 110 metres hurdles in the qualifying round of the IAAF World Championships. He competed in the 1999 and 2003 (South) Pacific Games, winning the 110 hurdles and finishing second in the 400 metres hurdles, setting the national record 51.67 in the latter in 1999 at Santa Rita, Guam.

He turned down a scholarship to the University of North Carolina.

== Rugby ==
The Fiji Olympic Committee wasn't doling out money to support athletes, so Naivalu followed his brother Saimoni into the world of professional rugby, playing for the San Jose Seahawks. Still making $300 a game, he had to work security for grocery stores to support himself.

== Defilement and imprisonment ==
In May 2003, Naivalu was arrested for defiling his 16-year old girlfriend. He was charged and jailed for seven years. After being released from jail, he left for Fiji where he currently resides and coaches the Suva Grammar School athletics team for the Coke Games

== Athletics achievements ==
Year	Competition	Venue	Position	Event	Notes
Representing Fiji
1996	World Junior Championships	Sydney, Australia	3rd	110m hurdles	13.91 s (wind: +1.8 m/s)
1997	South Pacific Mini Games	Pago Pago, American Samoa	1st	110 m hurdles	13.9 s (ht) w (wind: +2.8 m/s)
1997	South Pacific Mini Games	Pago Pago, American Samoa	1st	400 m hurdles	51.87 s
1997	South Pacific Mini Games	Pago Pago, American Samoa	3rd	Triple jump	14.49 m w (wind: +3.6 m/s)
1999	South Pacific Games	Santa Rita, Guam	1st	110 m hurdles	14.32 s (wind: -1.0 m/s) GR
1999	South Pacific Games	Santa Rita, Guam	2nd	400 m hurdles	51.67 s
2003	South Pacific Games	Suva, Fiji	1st	110 m hurdles	14.36 s (wind: -1.6 m/s)
2003	South Pacific Games	Suva, Fiji	2nd	400 m hurdles	52.50 s
2003	South Pacific Games	Suva, Fiji	2nd	4 × 400 m relay	3:11.82 min
2007	Pacific Games	Apia, Samoa	2nd	110 m hurdles	14.79 s (wind: +1.3 m/s)
