= Autiko Daunakamakama =

Fijian hurdler

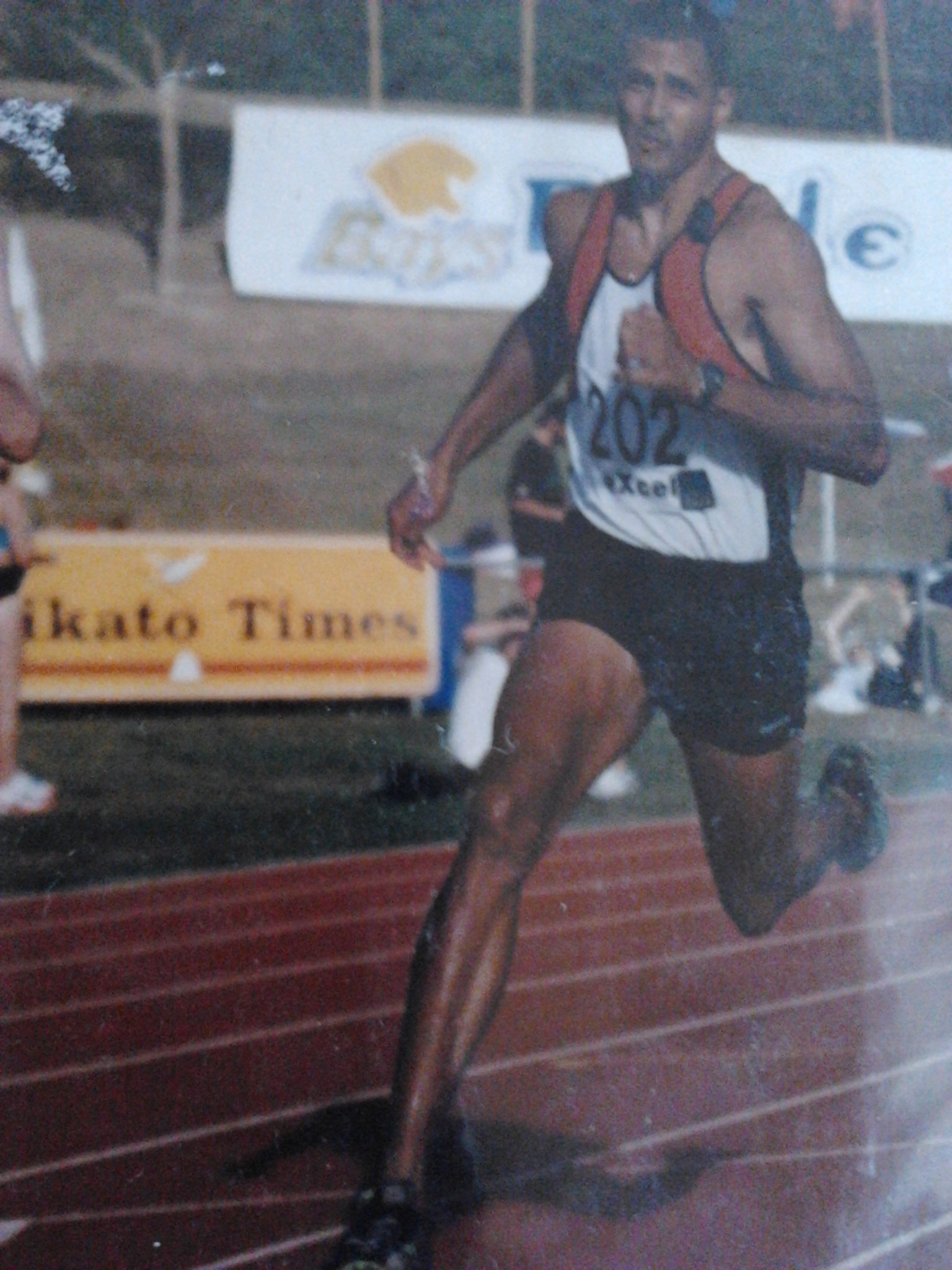

Personal information
- Full name: Autiko Waquawuca Daunakamakama
- Born: 7 May 1970 (age 56) Suva, Fiji
- Height: 188 cm (6 ft 2 in)
- Weight: 85 kg (187 lb)

Sport
- Country: Fiji
- Sport: Track and field
- Event: Hurdling

Achievements and titles
- Personal best: 51.81
Medal record
Men's athletics
Representing Fiji
Pacific Games
Silver medal – second place	1991 Port Moresby	4 × 400 m relay
Bronze medal – third place	1995 Pirae	400 m hurdles
Pacific Mini Games
Silver medal – second place	1993 Port Vila	400 m hurdles
Silver medal – second place	1997 Pago Pago	400 m hurdles
Oceanian Championships
Bronze medal – third place	1994 Auckland	400 m hurdles
Gold medal – first place	1994 Auckland	4 × 400 m relay

Autiko Waquawuca Daunakamakama Jr. is a Fijian former Olympic hurdler. He represented his country in the men's 400 metres hurdles at the 1992 Summer Olympics.

Beginning in 1991, Daunakamakama won six international medals throughout his career at the South Pacific Games, Pacific Mini Games, and Oceanian Championships. Daunakamakama was called a significant name of the 1991 South Pacific Games.

At the 1992 Olympics, Daunakamakama ran 53.90 seconds in the 400 m hurdles to place 7th in his heat.

Daunakamakama achieved his personal best time of 51.81 seconds at a 1997 meeting in Melbourne.

Following his athletics career, he moved into athletic coaching.
