= Tony Green (athletics official) =

Tony Green is the current president of Athletics Papua New Guinea. He was re-elected to the position in 2009. Green is also the senior vice president of Papua New Guinea Olympic Committee (PNGOC).
