= Peter Pulu =

Papua New Guinean sprinter

Personal information
- Born: 25 August 1975 (age 50) Arawa, Papua New Guinea
- Height: 1.73 m (5 ft 8 in)
- Weight: 65 kg (143 lb)

Sport
- Sport: Athletics
- Events: 60m, 100 m, 200 m

Peter Pulu (born 25 August 1975 in Arawa) is a retired athlete from Papua New Guinea who competed in sprinting events. He represented his country at the 1996 Summer Olympics, as well as two outdoor and four indoor World Championships. In addition, he won multiple medals on regional level.

== Competition record ==
Year	Competition	Venue	Position	Event	Notes
Representing Papua New Guinea
1993	South Pacific Mini Games	Port Vila, Vanuatu	3rd	100 m	11.37
1993	South Pacific Mini Games	Port Vila, Vanuatu	2nd	4x100 m relay	40.90
1994	Commonwealth Games	Victoria, Canada	(h)	100 m	10.64
1994	Commonwealth Games	Victoria, Canada	(h)	200 m	21.78
1995	World Indoor Championships	Barcelona, Spain	27th (h)	60 m	6.79
1995	World Championships	Gothenburg, Sweden	62nd (h)	100 m	10.68
1995	South Pacific Games	Pirae, Tahiti	2nd	100 m	10.54
1995	South Pacific Games	Pirae, Tahiti	2nd	200 m	21.47 (w)
1995	South Pacific Games	Pirae, Tahiti	1st	4x100 m relay	40.29
1995	South Pacific Games	Pirae, Tahiti	2nd	4x400 m relay	3:10.52
1996	Olympic Games	Atlanta, United States	82nd (h)	100 m	10.76
1996	Olympic Games	Atlanta, United States	–	4x100 m relay	DNF
1997	World Indoor Championships	Paris, France	42nd (h)	60 m	6.88
1997	World Championships	Athens, Greece	81st (h)	100 m	10.77
1997	South Pacific Mini Games	Pago Pago, American Samoa	2nd	100 m	10.70
1997	South Pacific Mini Games	Pago Pago, American Samoa	4th (h)	200 m	22.20
1998	Commonwealth Games	Kuala Lumpur, Malaysia	35th (h)	100 m	10.75
1998	Oceania Championships	Nuku'alofa, Tonga	1st	100 m	10.70
1998	Oceania Championships	Nuku'alofa, Tonga	1st	200 m	21.22 (w)
1998	Oceania Championships	Nuku'alofa, Tonga	1st	4x100 m relay	42.22
1998	Oceania Championships	Nuku'alofa, Tonga	1st	4x400 m relay	3:22.84
2000	Oceania Championships	Adelaide, Australia	1st	100 m	10.46 (w)
2000	Oceania Championships	Adelaide, Australia	1st	200 m	21.39 (w)
2001	World Indoor Championships	Lisbon, Portugal	35th (h)	60 m	6.89
2001	South Pacific Mini Games	Middlegate, Norfolk Island	1st	100 m	10.67
2001	South Pacific Mini Games	Middlegate, Norfolk Island	1st	200 m	22.22
2001	South Pacific Mini Games	Middlegate, Norfolk Island	1st	4x100 m relay	42.04
2001	South Pacific Mini Games	Middlegate, Norfolk Island	2nd	4x400 m relay	3:18.98
2002	Commonwealth Games	Manchester, United Kingdom	25th (qf)	100 m	10.73
2002	Commonwealth Games	Manchester, United Kingdom	27th (qf)	200 m	22.10
2002	Oceania Championships	Christchurch, New Zealand	1st	100 m	10.66
2002	Oceania Championships	Christchurch, New Zealand	1st	200 m	21.39
2002	Oceania Championships	Christchurch, New Zealand	1st	Medley relay	1:31.17
2003	World Indoor Championships	Birmingham, United Kingdom	35th (h)	60 m	6.79
2003	Melanesian Championships	Lae, Papua New Guinea	3rd	100 m	10.6
2003	Melanesian Championships	Lae, Papua New Guinea	4th	200 m	21.7
2003	Melanesian Championships	Lae, Papua New Guinea	1st	4x100 m relay	41.4
2003	Melanesian Championships	Lae, Papua New Guinea	1st	4x400 m relay	3:20.4
2003	South Pacific Games	Suva, Fiji	3rd	100 m	10.9
2003	South Pacific Games	Suva, Fiji	5th (h)	200 m	22.19
2003	South Pacific Games	Suva, Fiji	1st	4x100 m relay	40.94
2003	South Pacific Games	Suva, Fiji	1st	4x400 m relay	3:11.43
2007	Melanesian Championships	Cairns, Australia	8th	100 m	10.90
2007	Melanesian Championships	Cairns, Australia	1st	4x100 m relay	41.52

== Personal bests ==
Outdoor

- 100 metres – 10.40 (Stuttgart 1995) NR
- 200 metres – 21.51 (Prince George 1994)

Indoor

- 60 metres – 6.79 (Barcelona 1995) NR
