= Nadia Prasad =

French runner

Personal information
- Nationality: French
- Born: 6 October 1967 (age 58) Caussade
- Years active: 1990s
- Height: 1.58 m (5 ft 2 in)
- Weight: 44 kg (97 lb)

Sport
- Event: distance running
- Club: AC Calédonien
- Coached by: Mark Plaatjes; Michel Lukkier

Nadia Prasad Bernard (born October 6, 1967, at Caussade) is a French athlete, who specializes in distance races.

== Biographie ==
Grew up in New Caledonia, Nadia took part at the age of 15 in the 1983 South Pacific Games, in which she won Gold in the 1500 m and 3000 m (under the name of Nadia Bernard). Four years later, she again defended her title in both events at the 1987 South Pacific Games and also won a silver in the 800 meters. She met in this meet the Fijian distance runner, Bineshwar Prasad, whom she married two years later.

Her first big success was her victory at Las Vegas Marathon 1991. After having two children in the next two years, she returned to competition. She finished seventh at the Boston Marathon and third at New York City Marathon in 1993. In 1995 she won the Los Angeles Marathon, was French champion in the 10,000m, and competing for New Caledonia, she won three gold medals at the 1995 South Pacific Games (over 1500 m, 3000 m and 10,000 m).

She won the title of champion of France in the 10 000 m in 1995 and the marathon in 1996.

She held the French record for 10 km in 31 min 38 s, established on 16 October 1994 Chula Vista, in California.

In 1995, she won the Los Angeles Marathon at 2:29:48, a personal best time.

Nadia Prasad is 1.58 meters tall and weighs 44 kg. She lives with her husband and four children in Boulder (Colorado), where she works as a trainer and masseuse. She won the 1994 Bolder Boulder 10k race and in 2019 was inducted into the Boulder Sports Hall of Fame.

She became an American citizen on January 5, 2000.

=== Prize list ===
- French Championships in Athletics :
  - winner 10 000m in 1995
  - marathon winner in 1996

=== Records ===
Personal Bests
Event	Performance	Location	Date
3000 m	9:25.38	Richmond, Virginia	31 May 2000
5000 m	16:14.23	Victoria, British Columbia	27 May 2000
10 000 m	32:24.96		1994
10 km (route)	31:38 (RF)	Chula Vista	16 October 1994
Half marathon	1:09:05	Las Vegas	5 February 1994
Marathon	2:29:48	Los Angeles	1995

== Notes and references ==
- Docathlé2003, Fédération française d'athlétisme, 2003, p. 390
