= Vitolio Tipotio =

French javelin thrower

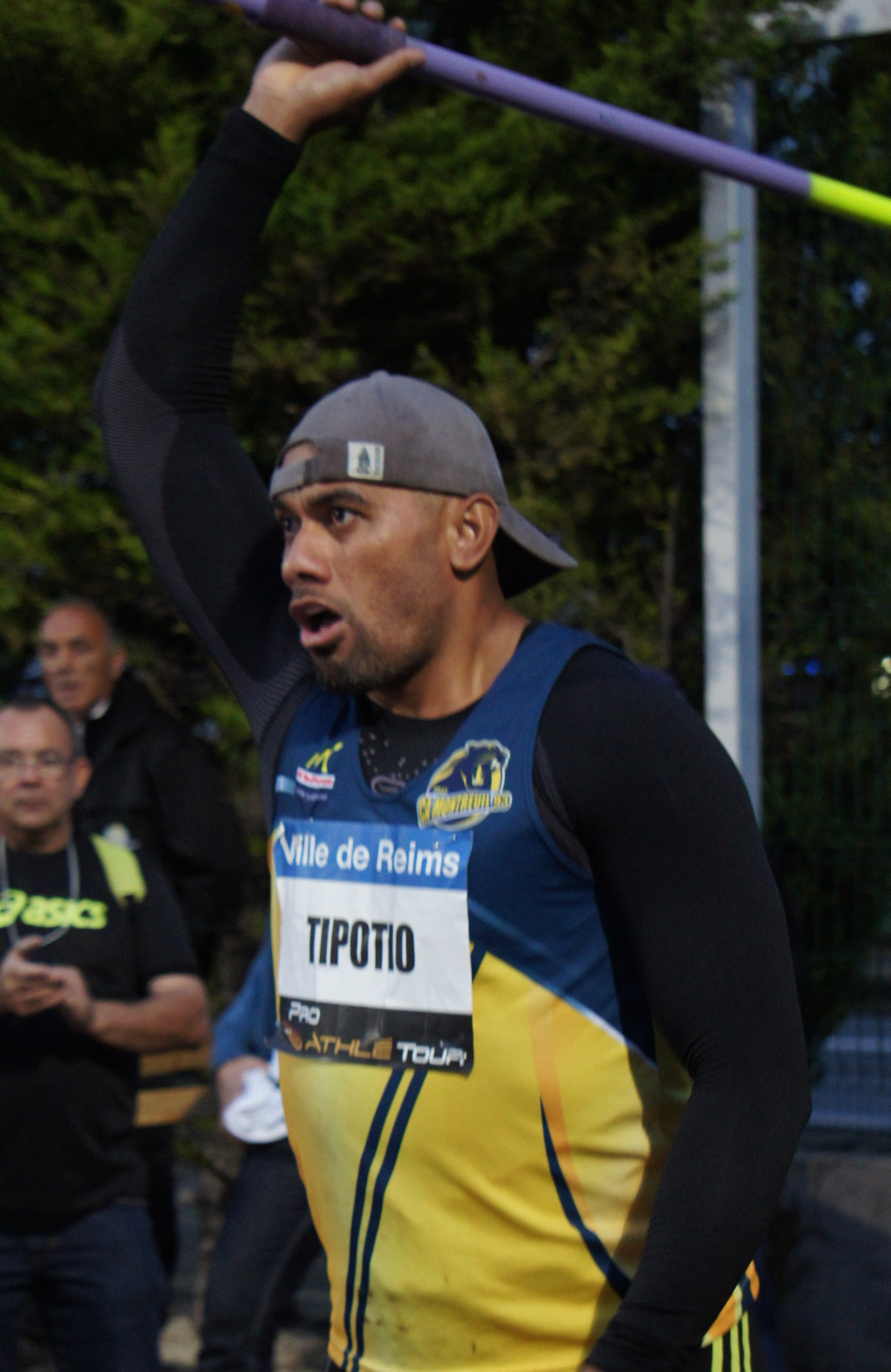
- Tipotio in Reims in 2013

Medal record

Men's athletics

Representing France

Mediterranean Games
Gold medal – first place	2005 Almería	Javelin throw

Vahaafenua Vitolio Tipotio (born 17 July 1975) is a French track and field athlete who competes in the javelin throw. Born in Wallis and Futuna, he competed for his native nation at the South Pacific Games, winning a bronze in 1995 and a silver in 1999.

Tipotio's highest honour was a gold medal at the 2005 Mediterranean Games. He is a two-time silver medallist at the Francophonie Games, reaching the podium in 1997 and again in 2005.

His personal best for the javelin is 80.34 m (263 ft 6 3/4 in), set in Saint-Étienne on 14 July 2002. He is a member of Ca Montreuil 93 athletic club.

== International competitions ==
Year	Competition	Venue	Position	Event	Notes
1995	South Pacific Games	Pirae, French Polynesia	3rd	Javelin throw	71.32 m
1997	Francophonie Games	Antananarivo, Madagascar	2nd	Javelin throw	72.61 m
1999	South Pacific Games	Santa Rita, Guam	2nd	Javelin throw	73.01 m
2005	Mediterranean Games	Almería, Spain	1st	Javelin throw	75.20 m
2005	Francophonie Games	Niamey, Niger	2nd	Javelin throw	67.79 m
2009	Mediterranean Games	Pescara, Italy	7th	Javelin throw	72.93 m
2009	Francophonie Games	Beirut, Lebanon	4th	Javelin throw	74.19 m

== National titles ==
- French Athletics Championships
  - Javelin throw: 2006, 2007, 2009, 2013

== See also ==
- List of javelin throw national champions (men)
