= Amos Ali =

Papua New Guinean athlete (born 1975)

Personal information
- Nationality: Papua New Guinean
- Born: 21 August 1975 (age 50) Vanimo, Papua New Guinea

Sport
- Sport: Sprinting
- Event: 200 metres
Medal record
Men's athletics
Representing Papua New Guinea
Pacific Games
Gold medal – first place	1995 Pirae	4 × 100 m
Bronze medal – third place	1995 Pirae	100 m
Bronze medal – third place	1995 Pirae	200 m

Amos Ali (born 21 August 1975) is a Papua New Guinean sprinter. He won medals at the Pacific Games and competed in the men's 200 metres, 4 × 100 metres, and 4 × 400 metres at the 1996 Summer Olympics.

== Career ==
At the 1995 Pacific Games, Ali ran the third leg for the gold-medal-winning Papua New Guinean 4 x 100 m team. Their time of 40.29 seconds was both a national record and a new championship record, both of which remained unbroken as of 2021. He also won bronze medals in the 100 metres and 200 metres.

He entered in the 200 m, 4 × 100 m, and 4 × 400 m at the 1996 Olympics. He ran 21.37 seconds in the 200 m to place 5th in his heat. He was scheduled to anchor the Papua New Guinean 4 × 100 m team, but they did not finish their heat. In the 4 × 400 m, Ali ran the third leg for his team and they ran 3:19.92 for 7th in their heat.

Ali also holds a tie for the fastest 60 metres ever run by a Papua New Guinean of 6.7 seconds.

== Personal life ==
Ali later became an athletics coach. He coached the only athlete from Sandaun Province to compete at the 2022 Papua New Guinean Athletics Championships. He coached Anthony Tanfa, who said, "my dream is to be like Amos Ali". He was part of the Papua New Guinean delegation to the 2024 Summer Olympics.
