= Mary-Estelle Mahuk =

Vanuatuan athlete (born 1966)

Personal information
- Born: August 11, 1966 (age 59)
- Height: 1.64 m (5 ft 4 1/2 in)
- Weight: 57 kg (126 lb)

Sport
- Country: Vanuatu
- Sport: Athletics
- Event: 100 metres

Mary-Estelle Mahuk (née Kapalu born 11 August 1966 in Tanna) is a Vanuatuan athlete.

Mahuk competed in three Summer Olympics for her country, at the 1992 Summer Olympics she competed in two events, in the 400 metres she finished 7th in her heat, then in the 400 metres hurdles she again finished 7th in her heat so in neither did she qualify for the next round. Four years later she went to Atlanta for the 1996 Summer Olympics, she entered the 400 metres hurdle and this time finished 6th in her heat but again failed to qualify, then she went to the 2000 Summer Olympics and in the 400 metres hurdles and this time she finished 5th in her heat. Mahuk reached the final and finished 7th in the 400 metres hurdles at the 1998 Commonwealth Games.

Mahuk was the flag bearer for Vanuatu in the 2000 Summer Olympics opening ceremony.

== Competition record ==
Year	Competition	Venue	Position	Event	Notes
Representing Vanuatu
1981	South Pacific Mini Games	Honiara, Solomon Islands	4th	400 m	60.67
1982	Commonwealth Games	Brisbane, Australia	29th (h)	200 m	27.64
1982	Commonwealth Games	Brisbane, Australia	22nd (h)	400 m	59.85
1983	South Pacific Games	Apia, Western Samoa	6th	200 m	26.60
1983	South Pacific Games	Apia, Western Samoa	3rd	400 m	59.05
1985	South Pacific Mini Games	Rarotonga, Cook Islands	4th	100 m	12.82 (w)
1985	South Pacific Mini Games	Rarotonga, Cook Islands	2nd	400 m	58.95
1986	Commonwealth Games	Edinburgh, United Kingdom	14th (h)	200 m	26.02
1986	Commonwealth Games	Edinburgh, United Kingdom	14th (h)	400 m	58.43
1991	World Championships	Tokyo, Japan	30th (h)	400 m	56.47
1991	South Pacific Games	Port Moresby, Papua New Guinea	5th	200 m	26.19
1991	South Pacific Games	Port Moresby, Papua New Guinea	1st	400 m	55.82
1991	South Pacific Games	Port Moresby, Papua New Guinea	1st	400 m hurdles	60.98
1992	Olympic Games	Barcelona, Spain	38th (h)	400 m	55.75
1992	Olympic Games	Barcelona, Spain	26th (h)	400 m hurdles	60.97
1993	World Championships	Stuttgart, Germany	28th (h)	400 m	56.06
1993	World Championships	Stuttgart, Germany	34th (h)	400 m hurdles	60.29
1993	South Pacific Mini Games	Port Vila, Vanuatu	1st	400 m	54.25
1993	South Pacific Mini Games	Port Vila, Vanuatu	1st	400 m hurdles	60.99
1994	Oceania Championships	Auckland, New Zealand	1st	400 m	55.72
1994	Oceania Championships	Auckland, New Zealand	1st	400 m hurdles	61.70
1994	Jeux de la Francophonie	Bondoufle, France	6th	400 m	54.90
1994	Jeux de la Francophonie	Bondoufle, France	12th (h)	400 m hurdles	59.69
1994	Commonwealth Games	Victoria, Canada	24th (h)	400 m	55.77
1994	Commonwealth Games	Victoria, Canada	14th (h)	400 m hurdles	59.94
1995	World Championships	Gothenburg, Sweden	38th (h)	400 m	53.92
1995	South Pacific Games	Pirae, Tahiti	2nd	200 m	24.85
1995	South Pacific Games	Pirae, Tahiti	1st	400 m	54.69
1995	South Pacific Games	Pirae, Tahiti	1st	400 m hurdles	59.65
1995	South Pacific Games	Pirae, Tahiti	2nd	4 × 400 m relay	3:57.50
1996	Olympic Games	Atlanta, United States	29th (h)	400 m hurdles	58.68
1998	Oceania Championships	Nuku'alofa, Tonga	2nd	400 m	55.06
1998	Oceania Championships	Nuku'alofa, Tonga	2nd	800 m	2:23.94
1998	Oceania Championships	Nuku'alofa, Tonga	2nd	400 m hurdles	61.10
1998	Commonwealth Games	Kuala Lumpur, Malaysia	21st (h)	400 m	55.60
1998	Commonwealth Games	Kuala Lumpur, Malaysia	7th	400 m hurdles	59.87
1999	South Pacific Games	Santa Rita, Guam	3rd	200 m	25.16
1999	South Pacific Games	Santa Rita, Guam	1st	400 m	54.30
1999	South Pacific Games	Santa Rita, Guam	2nd	800 m	2:18.33
1999	South Pacific Games	Santa Rita, Guam	1st	400 m hurdles	58.90
1999	World Championships	Seville, Spain	27th (h)	400 m hurdles	61.86
2000	Oceania Championships	Adelaide, Australia	1st	400 m	55.37
2000	Oceania Championships	Adelaide, Australia	1st	400 m hurdles	60.62
2000	Olympic Games	Sydney, Australia	32nd (h)	400 m hurdles	62.68
2001	Melanesian Championships	Suva, Fiji	3rd	200 m	26.0
2001	Melanesian Championships	Suva, Fiji	1st	400 m	59.0
2001	Melanesian Championships	Suva, Fiji	1st	400 m hurdles	65.5

Olympic Games
Preceded by Tawai Keiruan	Flagbearer for Vanuatu; Sydney 2000	Succeeded by Moses Kamut
