= Jone Delai =

Fijian sprinter (born 1967)

Personal information
- Born: September 5, 1967 (age 58) Naidrodro, Ba, Fiji

Sport
- Country: Fiji
- Sport: Athletics
- Event(s): 100 m, 200 m
- College team: Suva Grammar School

Achievements and titles
- Personal best(s): 10.34s - 100 m 21.22s - 200 m
Medal record
Men's athletics
Representing Fiji
(South) Pacific Games
Gold medal – first place	2007 Apia	100 m
Gold medal – first place	1999 Santa Rita	4x100 m relay
Gold medal – first place	1995 Pirae	100 m
Gold medal – first place	1995 Pirae	200 m
Gold medal – first place	1995 Pirae	4x400 m relay
Silver medal – second place	2003 Suva	100 m
Silver medal – second place	2003 Suva	4x100 m relay
Silver medal – second place	1995 Pirae	4x100 m relay
Silver medal – second place	1991 Port Moresby	4x00 m relay
Bronze medal – third place	1999 Santa Rita	100 m
Bronze medal – third place	1991 Port Moresby	100 m
(South) Pacific Mini Games
Gold medal – first place	1997 Pago Pago	100 m
Gold medal – first place	1997 Pago Pago	4x100 m relay
Gold medal – first place	1997 Pago Pago	4x400 m relay
Gold medal – first place	1993 Port Vila	100 m
Gold medal – first place	1993 Port Vila	200 m
Gold medal – first place	1993 Port Vila	4x100 m relay
Gold medal – first place	1993 Port Vila	4x400 m relay
Silver medal – second place	2005 Koror	100 m
Silver medal – second place	2005 Koror	4x100 m relay
Silver medal – second place	1997 Pago Pago	200 m
Oceania Championships
Gold medal – first place	1994 Auckland	100 m
Gold medal – first place	1994 Auckland	200 m
Bronze medal – third place	1990 Suva	100 m
- Updated on 28 April 2013

Jone Delai (born September 5, 1967) is a Fijian former sprinter. Competing mostly over 100 metres, his personal best is 10.26 seconds.

Delai won a bronze medal in 100 metres at the 1990 Oceanian Championships, and became Oceanian champion over both 100 and 200 metres in 1994. Jone competed in the 1996 and 2000 Summer Olympics. In 1998 he became the California Junior College 100 meters champion tying his personal best.

Jone Delai held the title of Fastest Man in the Pacific, with a time of 10.34s in the 100m sprints which was a South Pacific Games record. The SPG Record & his personal achieved best now comes in 2nd to reigning sprint king, Banuve Tabakaucoro's 10.22s for the 100m sprint.

He has been a teacher at Suva Grammar School since 2007.

== Achievements ==
Year	Competition	Venue	Position	Event	Notes
Representing Fiji
1990	Oceania Championships	Suva, Fiji	3rd	100 m	10.92 s
1991	South Pacific Games	Port Moresby, Papua New Guinea	3rd	100 m	10.93 s (wind: -2.4 m/s)
1991	South Pacific Games	Port Moresby, Papua New Guinea	2nd	4 × 100 m relay	40.90 s
1993	South Pacific Mini Games	Port Vila, Vanuatu	1st	100 m	11.06 s (wind: -6.0 m/s)
1993	South Pacific Mini Games	Port Vila, Vanuatu	1st	200 m	21.38 s (wind: -3.3 m/s)
1993	South Pacific Mini Games	Port Vila, Vanuatu	1st	4 × 100 m relay	40.47 s
1993	South Pacific Mini Games	Port Vila, Vanuatu	1st	4 × 400 m relay	3:09.97 min
1994	Oceania Championships	Auckland, New Zealand	1st	100 m	10.63 s (wind: -0.3 m/s)
1994	Oceania Championships	Auckland, New Zealand	1st	200 m	21.55 s (wind: +0.7 m/s)
1995	South Pacific Games	Pirae, French Polynesia	1st	100 m	10.34 s (wind: +0.0 m/s) GR
1995	South Pacific Games	Pirae, French Polynesia	1st	200 m	21.20 s (wind: +2.9 m/s) w
1995	South Pacific Games	Pirae, French Polynesia	2nd	4 × 100 m relay	40.52 s
1995	South Pacific Games	Pirae, French Polynesia	1st	4 × 400 m relay	3:10.16 min
1997	South Pacific Mini Games	Pago Pago, American Samoa	1st	100 m	10.52 s (wind: -2.0 m/s)
1997	South Pacific Mini Games	Pago Pago, American Samoa	2nd	200 m	21.38 s (wind: -3.6 m/s)
1997	South Pacific Mini Games	Pago Pago, American Samoa	1st	4 × 100 m relay	40.15 s GR
1997	South Pacific Mini Games	Pago Pago, American Samoa	1st	4 × 400 m relay	3:13.80 min
1999	South Pacific Games	Santa Rita, Guam	3rd	100 m	10.79 s (wind: -1.1 m/s)
1999	South Pacific Games	Santa Rita, Guam	1st	4 × 100 m relay	40.48 s
2003	South Pacific Games	Suva, Fiji	2nd	100 m	10.9 s (ht)
2003	South Pacific Games	Suva, Fiji	2nd	4 × 100 m relay	41.03 s
2005	South Pacific Mini Games	Koror, Palau	2nd	100 m	10.73 s (wind: +0.5 m/s)
2005	South Pacific Mini Games	Koror, Palau	2nd	4 × 100 m relay	41.97 s
2007	Pacific Games	Apia, Samoa	1st	100 m	10.66 s (wind: +0.7 m/s)
