= Baobo Neuendorf =

Papua New Guinean athlete

Personal information
- Full name: Baobo Neuendorf-Duaba
- Nationality: Papua New Guinean
- Born: 31 August 1972 (age 53)

Sport
- Sport: Sprinting
- Event: 4 × 400 metres relay

Baobo Neuendorf-Duaba (born 31 August 1972) is a Papua New Guinean sprinter. He competed in the men's 4 × 400 metres relay at the 1992 Summer Olympics.
