= Rachel Rogers =

Fijian hurdler

Personal information
- Nationality: Fijian
- Born: 16 June 1975 (age 51)

Sport
- Sport: Track and field
- Event: 100 metres hurdles

Rachel Rogers (born 16 June 1975) is a Fijian hurdler. She competed in the women's 100 metres hurdles at the 1996 Summer Olympics.
