= Tavakalo Kailes =

Vanuatuan middle-distance runner

Tavakalo Kailes (born 14 July 1973) is a Vanuatuan athlete, born on Efate.

Kailes competed at the 1996 Summer Olympics held in Atlanta, he entered the 800 metres where he finished 7th out of eight runners in his heat and so didn't qualify for the next round.
