= Baptiste Firiam =

Vanuatuan sprinter

Personal information
- Born: June 22, 1971 (age 55) Port Vila, Vanuatu
- Height: 1.73 m (5 ft 8 in)
- Weight: 60 kg (130 lb)

Sport
- Country: Vanuatu
- Sport: Athletics
- Events: 400 metres, 800 metres

Baptiste Firiam (born 22 June 1971 in Port Vila) is a Vanuatuan sprinter

Firiam competed in two Summer Olympics, firstly at the 1988 Summer Olympics held in Seoul, where he entered the 400 metres and came 7th out of 7 runners in his heat so didn't qualify for the next round, four years later he competed at the 1992 Summer Olympics and again in the 400 metres he came 7th in his heat so didn't go through to the next round, he also entered the 800 metres and yet again he finished 7th in his heat and failed to qualify.
