= Ivan Wakit =

Papua New Guinean athletics competitor

Personal information
- Nationality: Papua New Guinean
- Born: 10 April 1974 (age 52) Bougainville Island, Papua New Guinea
- Height: 179 cm (5 ft 10 in)
- Weight: 69 kg (152 lb)

Sport
- Country: Papua New Guinea
- Sport: Middle-distance running, hurdling

Ivan Wakit (born 10 April 1974) is a Papua New Guinean Olympic middle-distance runner and hurdler. He represented his country in the men's 400 metres hurdles at the 1996 Summer Olympics, as well as in the men's 4 × 400 metres relay. His time was a 53.42 in the hurdles, and his team's time was a 3:19.92 in the relay.
