= Henry Semiti Rogo =

Fijian sprinter

Personal information
- Nationality: Fijian
- Born: 29 October 1968 (age 57)

Sport
- Sport: Sprinting
- Event: 4 × 100 metres relay

Henry Rogo (born 29 October 1968) is a Fijian sprinter. He competed in the men's 4 × 100 metres relay at the 1996 Summer Olympics.
