= Vaciseva Tavaga =

Fijian athlete

Personal information
- Nationality: Fijian
- Born: 16 November 1973 (age 52)

Sport
- Sport: Sprinting
- Event: 100 metres
Medal record
Women's athletics
Representing Fiji
(South) Pacific Games
Gold medal – first place	1991 Port Moresby	200m
Silver medal – second place	1991 Port Moresby	400m

Vaciseva Tavaga (born 16 November 1973) is a Fijian sprinter. She competed in the women's 100 metres at the 1992 Summer Olympics.
