= Bineshwar Prasad =

Fijian long-distance runner

Personal information
- Nationality: Fijian
- Born: 18 July 1963 (age 62)

Sport
- Sport: Long-distance running
- Event: Marathon

Bineshwar Prasad (born 18 July 1963) is a Fijian long-distance runner. He competed in the men's marathon at the 1988 Summer Olympics and the 1992 Summer Olympics.
