= Solomone Bole =

Fijian sprinter (born 1974)

Personal information
- Nationality: Fijian
- Born: 23 June 1974 (age 52)

Sport
- Sport: Sprinting
- Event: 4 × 100 metres relay

Solomone Bole (born 23 June 1974) is a Fijian former sprinter. He competed in the men's 4 × 100 metres relay at the 1996 Summer Olympics.
