= Tawai Keiruan =

Vanuatuan athlete (born 1972)

Tawai Keiruan (born 3 September 1972 in Tanna) is a Vanuatuan athlete.

Keiruan competed in two Summer Olympics for his country. At the 1992 Summer Olympics in Barcelona, he entered the 5000 metres where he finished 13th out of 14 starters and did not qualify for the final. Four years later at the 1996 Summer Olympics in Atlanta he entered the 1500 metres and came last in his heat so again he didn't qualify for the next round.

Keiruan was the flag bearer for Vanuatu in the 1996 Summer Olympics opening ceremony.
