= Salome Tabuatalei =

Female Fijian athlete

Personal information
- Born: 1959 or 1960 (age 65–66) Wailevu, Macuata Province, Fiji

Sport
- Country: Fiji
- Sport: Track and field; Canoeing
- Events: 800 metres; 1500 metres; 5000 metres; 10,000 metres; Half-marathon; Marathon

Salome Tabuatalei (Lome Lei) is a Fijian athlete who competed at international level in a wide range of athletic events and in canoeing, from 1993 to 2019. She was named Fiji's Sportswoman of the Year in 1996 and 1997.

== Early life ==
Salome Tabuatalei was born in the village of Wailevu in Macuata Province on the north-eastern part of the island of Vanua Levu in Fiji, where her father, who had been an athlete, was a forester. She used to run with her brothers. Invited to take part in Fiji's national trials in Suva at a young age, she was prevented from doing so by the non-arrival of the boat to get her to the main island of Viti Levu. After leaving school and getting a job as a clerk in Labasa, she used to join the weekly Hash House Harriers run, as preparation to take part in Suva's annual fun run. Her training partner was a high court judge. Taking part in the Suva fun run, she came third, second and first in successive years.

== Athletic career ==
Tabuatalei first competed for Fiji in the Pacific Mini Games, held in Port Vila, Vanuatu in 1993, where she ran in the 1500 metres. She then competed in the 1995 South Pacific Games (now the Pacific Games) in Papeete, Tahiti, winning the 800 metres in a record time, which remained the record in 2020. In the South Pacific Games at Santa Rita, Guam she won the 1500 metres and the 10,000 metres, finishing second in the 5000 metres. In Fiji's capital, Suva, in 2003 she won a bronze medal in the half-marathon. In 2011 in New Caledonia and 2015 in Papua New Guinea she competed in the marathon at the now-renamed Pacific Games. In 2019, in Samoa, she competed in the Outrigger Canoe events. In between her appearances at the Pacific Games, she also represented Fiji at the Pacific Mini Games and at the Oceania Games. She was a judge in the 2017 Oceania Games. In 2014 she was the sole representative of Fiji in the World Sprints Outrigger Canoe championship, held in Brazil, and she also competed in the 2019 World Sprints in New Zealand.

In 2010, Tabuatalei took part in a three-month voyage on the Uto ni Yalo, one of seven large Vakas that travelled the Pacific Ocean highlighting conservation issues and reviving traditional sailing and navigational knowledge. In 2014, she joined a similar voyage from California to the Galapagos Islands.

== Personal life ==
Tabuatalei has two children. Her husband died in 2014. She works as a gym instructor at the University of the South Pacific and also as a personal trainer.
