= Athletics Papua New Guinea =

Governing body for athletics in Papua New Guinea

- Sport: Athletics
- Founded: 1961
- Affiliation: World Athletics
- Affiliation date: 1962
- Regional affiliation: OAA
- Headquarters: Kokopo, East New Britain
- President: Tony Green
- Vice president: Sophia Marai
- Secretary: George Moramoro
- Replaced: Papua New Guinea Athletic Union
- (Papua New Guinea)

Athletics Papua New Guinea (Athletics PNG) is the governing body for the sport of athletics in Papua New Guinea. Current president is Tony Green. He was re-elected in July 2009.

== History ==
Athletics PNG was founded in 1961, and was affiliated to the IAAF in the year 1962.

== Affiliations ==
- World Athletics
- Oceania Athletics Association (OAA)

Moreover, it is part of the following national organisations:

- Papua New Guinea Olympic Committee (PNGOC)

== National records ==
Athletics PNG maintains the Papua New Guinean records in athletics.
