= List of Tongan records in athletics =

The following are the national records in athletics in Tonga maintained by Tonga's national athletics federation: Tonga Athletic Association (TAA).

== Outdoor ==
Key to tables: Awaiting ratification Record not kept by TAA Not ratified or later rescinded TAA

=== Men ===
Event	Record	Athlete	Date	Meet	Place	Ref.
100 m	10.56 (+1.7 m/s)	Toluta'u Koula	29 November 1996	Oceania Championships	Townsville, Australia	
100 m	10.4 h	Toluta'u Koula	23 May 1998		Port Vila, Vanuatu	
200 m	21.71	Peni'akau Loloa	14 February 1987		Sydney, Australia	
200 m	21.4 h	Toluta'u Koula	5 August 1994		San Francisco, United States	
400 m	48.31	Henele Taliai	1 March 1997		Melbourne, Australia	
800 m	1:56.8 h	Henele Taliai	26 November 1998		Melbourne, Australia	
1000 m	2:31.05	Paea Funaki	19 August 1994		Victoria, Australia	
1500 m	4:03.1 h	Tui'ese Ngaluafe	28 April 1979		Nuku'alofa, Tonga	
3000 m	9:02.01	Atui Ngalu	4 June 1993		Nuku'alofa, Tonga	
5000 m	17:07.6 h	Peau'afi Houkinima	13 September 1971	South Pacific Games	Pirae, French Polynesia	
10,000 m	37:33.6 a	Peau'afi Houkinima	30 August 1979	South Pacific Games	Suva, Fiji	
Half marathon	1:25.08	Matthew Kaea	6 February 2006		San Francisco, California, United States	
Marathon	2:58:51	Matthew Kaea	7 March 2010	Napa Valley Marathon	Napa Valley, United States	
110 m hurdles	14.49 (+1.4 m/s)	Sanitesi Latu	25 January 1975		Christchurch, New Zealand	
110 m hurdles	14.4 h	Sanitesi Latu	9 March 1974		Melbourne, Australia	
110 m hurdles	14.4 h	Sanitesi Latu	15 February 1975		Melbourne, Australia	
400 m hurdles	52.02	Paea Kokohu	5 May 1996		Sacramento, United States	
3000 m steeplechase	10:31.95	Paeu'afi Haukinima	1 September 1979	South Pacific Games	Suva, Fiji	
High jump	2.06 m	Mosese Foliaki	16 July 2019	Pacific Games	Apia, Samoa	
Pole vault	4.90 m	'Aisea Tukutau	7 August 1996		Wollongong, Australia	
Long jump	7.27 m	Tokaikolo Latapu	7–10 April 2000		Nuku'alofa, Tonga	
Triple jump	14.18 m	Viliame Vaki	April 1997		Nuku'alofa, Tonga	
Triple jump	14.18 m	Tokaikolo Latapu	7–10 April 2000		Nuku'alofa, Tonga	
Shot put	19.03 m	Joshua Uikilifi	27 February 2016	Johnny Mathis Invitational	San Francisco, United States	
Discus throw	56.42 m	Tevita Puloka	4 May 2002		Arlington, Texas, United States	
Hammer throw	59.78 m	Sanitesi Mataele	20 April 1985		Tucson, United States	
Javelin throw	59.03 m	Homelo Vi	16 January 1993		Adelaide, Australia	
Decathlon	7062 pts	Sanitesi Latu	26–27 January 1974		Christchurch, New Zealand	
Decathlon	100m / Long jump / Shot put / High jump / 400m / 110m H / Discus / Pole vault / Javelin / 1500m; 11.34 / 7.00 m / 13.34 m / 1.91 m / 50.62 / 14.77 / 39.44 m / 3.60 m / 56.78 m / 5:04.38					
20 km walk (road)						
50 km walk (road)						
4 × 100 m relay	41.20	Tonga; Tolota'u Koula; Tevita Faunonuku; Mateaki Mafi; Peauope Suli	21 September 1991	South Pacific Games	Port Moresby, Papua New Guinea	
4 × 400 m relay	3:19.48	Tonga; Siale Vaha'i; Mateaki Mafi; Peauope Suli; Paea Kokohu	21 September 1991	South Pacific Games	Port Moresby, Papua New Guinea	

=== Women ===
Event	Record	Athlete	Date	Meet	Place	Ref.
100 m	12.19	Latai Sikuvea	9 December 2004		Cairns, Australia	
100 m	11.6 h	Latai Sikuvea	9 December 2002		Ballarat, Australia	
200 m	24.51	Latai Sikuvea	11 December 2004		Cairns, Australia	
400 m	57.98	Vasa Tulahe	30 January 1994		Sydney, Australia	
800 m	2:14.07	Vasa Tulahe	22 August 1995	South Pacific Games	Pirae, French Polynesia	
800 m	2:14.0 h	Vasa Tulahe	11 March 1995		Canberra, Australia	
1500 m	4:40.33	Vasa Tulahe	17 February 1996		Sydney, Australia	
3000 m	10:47.2 h	Vasa Tulahe	23 January 1996		Canberra, Australia	
3000 m	10:30.6 h	Vasa Tulahe	23 January 1996		Canberra, Australia	
5000 m	19:34.12	Vasa Tulahe	30 November 1996	Oceania Championships	Townsville Australia	
5000 m	18:37.0 h	Pauline Vea^{†}	3 January 1992		Wellington, New Zealand	
10,000 m	38:08.41	Pauline Vea^{†}	11 December 1993	South Pacific Mini Games	Port Vila, Vanuatu	
Marathon	5:09.41	Falamoe Fau’ese Weber	25 September 2011		Berlin, Germany	
Marathon	2:54.02	Pauline Vea^{†}	24 August 1995	South Pacific Games	Pirae, French Polynesia	
100 m hurdles	14.35 (+2.0 m/s)	Siulolo Liku	2 March 1997		Melbourne, Australia	
100 m hurdles	14.35 (−0.5 m/s)	Siulolo Liku	7 June 1999	South Pacific Games	Santa Rita, Guam	
100 m hurdles	13.8 h (+1.8 m/s)	Siulolo Liku	18 August 1997	South Pacific Mini Games	Tafuna, American Samoa	
400 m hurdles	1:07.72	Lata Manoa	28 August 1998	Oceania Championships	Nuku'alofa, Tonga	
3000 m steeplechase						
High jump	1.80 m	Melesia Mafile'o	April 2004		Nuku'alofa, Tonga	
Pole vault	2.50 m	Melesia Mafile'o	22 February 2003		Auckland, New Zealand	
Long jump	6.23 m (−1.0 m/s)	Siulolo Liku	11 February 1995		Sydney, Australia	
Triple jump	12.57 m (+2.4 m/s)?	Melesia Mafile'o	19 May 2007	NJCAA Championships	Coffeyville, United States	
Shot put	18.03 m	Ana Po'uhila	18 July 2008		Albertville, France	
Discus throw	53.82 m	Melehifo Uhi	28 January 2006		Christchurch, New Zealand	
Hammer throw	53.53 m	Ana Po'uhila	2 July 2009		Aix-les-Bains, France	
Javelin throw	45.25 m	Ana Po'uhila	3 May 2008		Mont-Dore, France	
Heptathlon	4403 pts	Melesia Mafile'o	8–9 March 2003		Palmerston North, New Zealand	
Heptathlon	100m H / High jump / Shot put / 200m / Long jump / Javelin / 800m					
20 km walk (road)						
4 × 100 m relay	48.61	Tonga; Patiola Pahulu; Latai Sikuvea; Mele To'a; Vasi Feke	26 September 2009	Pacific Mini Games	Nikao, Cook Islands	
4 × 400 m relay	3:59.75	Tonga; Malia Makisi; T. Tapu; Tina Tupou; Sandra 'Aho	30 August 1989	South Pacific Mini Games	Nuku'alofa, Tonga	

^{†}: UK citizen married to Tongan.

== Indoor ==
=== Men ===
Event	Record	Athlete	Date	Meet	Place	Ref.
60 m	7.08	Siueni Filimone	18 March 2016	World Championships	Portland, United States	
200 m						
400 m						
800 m						
1500 m						
3000 m						
60 m hurdles	9.06	Inoke Finau	12 March 2010	World Championships	Doha, Qatar	
60 m hurdles	8.51	Mosese Foliaki	2 March 2024	World Championships	Glasgow, United Kingdom	
High jump						
Pole vault						
Long jump						
Triple jump						
Shot put	15.86 m	Tevita Puloka	25/26 February 2000		Boston, United States	
Weight throw	18.41 m	Jobi Finau	19 February 2018	Sun Belt Indoor Track & Field Championships	Birmingham, United States	
Heptathlon						
Heptathlon	60m / Long jump / Shot put / High jump / 60m H / Pole vault / 1000m					
5000 m walk						
4 × 400 m relay						

=== Women ===
Event	Record	Athlete	Date	Meet	Place	Ref.
60 m	8.45	Belinda Talakai	10 March 2012	World Championships	Istanbul, Turkey	
200 m						
400 m						
800 m	2:52.36 OT	Melesia Mafile'o	3 March 2007		Lubbock, United States	
1500 m						
3000 m						
55 m hurdles	8.76	Melesia Mafile'o	4 February 2006		Lubbock, United States	
60 m hurdles	9.40 A	Melesia Mafile'o	28 January 2006		Albuquerque, United States	
High jump	1.68 m	Melesia Mafile'o	4 February 2006		Lubbock, United States	
Pole vault						
Long jump	5.41 m	Melesia Mafile'o	18 February 2006		Norman, United States	
Triple jump	12.19 m	Melesia Mafile'o	18 February 2006		Norman, United States	
Shot put	13.69 m	Melesia Mafile'o	6 February 2010		Lubbock, United States	
Weight throw	15.34 m	Melesia Mafile'o	22 January 2010		Lubbock, United States	
Pentathlon	2918 pts A	Melesia Mafileʼo	28 January 2005		Albuquerque, United States	
Pentathlon	60m / Long jump / Shot put / High jump / 60m H / Pole vault / 1000m					
Pentathlon	3361 pts OT	Melesia Mafileʼo	3 March 2007		Lubbock, United States	
Pentathlon	60m H / High jump / Shot put / Long jump / 800m; 9.46 / 1.66 m / 12.16 m / 5.25 m / 2:52.36					
3000 m walk						
4 × 400 m relay						
