= Athletics at the 1991 South Pacific Games =

Athletics at the IX South Pacific Games
- Dates: September 13–21
- Host city: Port Moresby, Papua New Guinea
- Level: Senior
- Events: 41 (23 men, 18 women)
- Participation: 16 nations
- Records set: 14

Athletics competitions at the 1991 South Pacific Games were held in Port Moresby, Papua New Guinea, between September 13–21, 1991.

A total of 41 events were contested, 23 by men and 18 by women.

== Medal summary ==
Medal winners and their results were published on the Athletics Weekly webpage courtesy of Tony Isaacs and Børre Lilloe, and on the Oceania Athletics Association webpage by Bob Snow.

Complete results can also be found on the Oceania Athletics Association webpage by Bob Snow.

=== Men ===
| Event | Gold | | Silver | | Bronze | |
|---|---|---|---|---|---|---|
| 100 metres (wind: -2.4 m/s) | Ezekiel Wartovo (PNG) | 10.80 GR | Takale Tuna (PNG) | 10.92 | Jone Delai (FIJ) | 10.93 |
| 200 metres (wind: -3.9 m/s) | Takale Tuna (PNG) | 21.79 | Anare Raqiqia (FIJ) | 21.86 | Subul Babo (PNG) | 21.97 |
| 400 metres | Subul Babo (PNG) | 46.77 GR | Takale Tuna (PNG) | 47.24 | Baobo Duaba (PNG) | 47.43 |
| 800 metres | Baptiste Firiam (VAN) | 1:54.81 | Peteresio Ranuku (FIJ) | 1:55.65 | Uraia Koroi (FIJ) | 1:55.91 |
| 1500 metres | Davendra Singh (FIJ) | 4:00.44 | Peteresio Ranuku (FIJ) | 4:02.91 | Anil Kumar (FIJ) | 4:03.14 |
| 5000 metres | Davendra Singh (FIJ) | 15:12.43 | Tawai Keiruan (VAN) | 15:47.56 | Binesh Prasad (FIJ) | 15:55.48 |
| 10000 metres | Alain Lazare (NCL) | 31:44.58 | Binesh Prasad (FIJ) | 32:34.68 | Ashok Kumar (FIJ) | 34:05.67 |
| Marathon | Binesh Prasad (FIJ) | 2:36:17 | Jean-Michel Boulanger (NCL) | 2:38:54 | Tim Omundsen (PNG) | 2:41:53 |
| 3000 metres steeplechase | Davendra Singh (FIJ) | 9:35.82 | Moses Khan (FIJ) | 10:05.98 | Ancel Nalau (VAN) | 10:10.47 |
| 110 metres hurdles (wind: -1.5 m/s) | William Fong (SAM) | 14.86 | Albert Chambonnier (NCL) | 14.86 | Albert Miller (FIJ) | 15.03 |
| 400 metres hurdles | Baobo Duaba (PNG) | 52.50 | Kaminiel Selot (PNG) | 53.24 | Albert Chambonnier (NCL) | 54.25 |
| High jump | Jean-Bernard Fuller (NCL) | 2.05 | Jale Waivure (FIJ) | 1.98 | (French Polynesia) /Jean-Luc Mu Kwai Chuan (TAH) | 1.95 |
| Pole vault | (French Polynesia) /Thibaut Cattiau (TAH) | 4.70 GR | (French Polynesia) /Jean-Luc Mu Kwai Chuan (TAH) | 4.20 | (Wallis and Futuna) /Nizié Feleu (WLF) | 4.00 |
| Long jump | Gabriele Qoro (FIJ) | 7.49 w (wind: +3.1 m/s) | (French Polynesia) /Robert Tupuhoé (TAH) | 7.18 w (wind: +3.9 m/s) | Ikani Taliai (TGA) | 7.09 w (wind: +4.7 m/s) |
| Triple jump | Steeve Druminy (NCL) | 15.66 w (wind: +4.8 m/s) | (French Polynesia) /Apolosi Foliaki (TAH) | 15.02 w (wind: +2.4 m/s) | Eliesa Latu (TGA) | 14.87 w (wind: +2.5 m/s) |
| Shot put | Jean-Pierre Totélé (NCL) | 16.44 | (French Polynesia) /Gordon Barff (TAH) | 15.76 | Victor Lakafia (NCL) | 15.35 |
| Discus throw | (French Polynesia) /Gordon Barff (TAH) | 51.32 GR | Jean-Pierre Totélé (NCL) | 46.66 | Frederick Morgan (ASA) | 45.78 |
| Hammer throw | Soane Lakafia (NCL) | 55.58 | Topié Suve (NCL) | 54.38 | Frédéric Cassier (NCL) | 49.96 |
| Javelin throw | Jean-Paul Lakafia (NCL) | 77.12 | (Wallis and Futuna) /Jean-Baptiste Siselo (WLF) | 72.66 | (Wallis and Futuna) /Fapiano Fakataulavelua (WLF) | 69.70 |
| Decathlon | Albert Miller (FIJ) | 7265 GR | (Wallis and Futuna) /Nizié Feleu (WLF) | 6681 | Homelo Vi (TGA) | 6572 |
| 20 Kilometres Road Walk | Caleb Maybir (FIJ) | 1:51:39 GR | Pramesh Prasad (FIJ) | 1:55:54 | Joe Kaikai (PNG) | 2:12:13 |
| 4 x 100 metres relay | Papua New Guinea; Ezekiel Wartovo; Subul Babo; Baobo Duabaa; Takale Tuna | 40.54 GR | Fiji; Gabriel Qoro; Jone Delai; Anare Raqiqia; Jone Marayawa | 40.90 | Tonga; Toluta'u Koula; Tevita Fauonuku; Mateaki Mafi; Peauope Suli | 41.20 |
| 4 x 400 metres relay | Papua New Guinea; Takale Tuna; Baobo Duaba; Kaminiel Selot; Subul Babo | 3:09.55 GR | Fiji; Apisai Driu; Calvin Yee; Autiko Daunakamakama; Anare Raqiqia | 3:13.53 | Tonga; Siale Vaha'i; Mateaki Mafi; Peauope Suli; Paea Kokohu | 3:19.53 |

=== Women ===
| Event | Gold | | Silver | | Bronze | |
|---|---|---|---|---|---|---|
| 100 metres (wind: -2.5 m/s) | Ghislaine Saint-Prix (NCL) | 12.25 | Laure Uedre (NCL) | 12.43 | (French Polynesia) /Albertine An (TAH) | 12.60 |
| 200 metres (wind: -2.9 m/s) | Vaciseva Tavaga (FIJ) | 25.30 | Ghislaine Saint-Prix (NCL) | 25.68 | Laure Uedre (NCL) | 26.11 |
| 400 metres | Mary Estelle Kapalu (VAN) | 55.82 GR | Vaciseva Tavaga (FIJ) | 56.97 | (French Polynesia) /Katia Sanford (TAH) | 57.49 |
| 800 metres | Karolina Tanono (FIJ) | 2:17.14 | Jen Allred (GUM) | 2:19.19 | Poloni Avek (PNG) | 2:19.26 |
| 1500 metres | Jen Allred (GUM) | 4:43.91 | Karolina Tanono (FIJ) | 4:46.83 | Rosemary Turare (PNG) | 4:48.37 |
| 3000 metres | Jen Allred (GUM) | 10:27.04 | Rosemary Turare (PNG) | 10:28.30 | Iva Bati Nabutulovo (FIJ) | 10:48.27 |
| 10000 metres | Jen Allred (GUM) | 39:35.60 GR | Rosemary Turare (PNG) | 39:56.82 | Marie Benito (GUM) | 40:19.71 |
| Marathon | Jen Allred (GUM) | 3:25:17 | Christine Taitano (GUM) | 3:25:50 | Marie Benito (GUM) | 3:33:20 |
| 100 metres hurdles (wind: -2.1 m/s) | (French Polynesia) /Albertine An (TAH) | 14.70 | Lillyanne Beining (PNG) | 14.88 | (French Polynesia) /Katia Sanford (TAH) | 15.00 |
| 400 metres hurdles | Mary Estelle Kapalu (VAN) | 60.98 | (French Polynesia) /Tahiri Homerang (PNG) | 61.52 | Lily Tua (PNG) | 62.94 |
| High jump | (French Polynesia) /Albertine An (TAH) | 1.75 | Dionne Gardner (NFK) | 1.71 | Angela Way (PNG) | 1.60 |
| Long jump | (French Polynesia) /Albertine An (TAH) | 5.92 (wind: +1.5 m/s) =GR | Rosi Tamani (FIJ) | 5.73 (wind: +2.0 m/s) | Lily Tua (PNG) | 5.67 (wind: +1.7 m/s) |
| Shot put | Marie-Christine Fakaté (NCL) | 13.64 | Marie-Danielle Teanyouen (NCL) | 13.05 | Iammo Launa (PNG) | 12.61 |
| Discus throw | Marie-Christine Fakaté (NCL) | 47.88 GR | (French Polynesia) /Sandra Pito (TAH) | 42.38 | Mereoni Vibose (FIJ) | 41.48 |
| Javelin throw | Iammo Launa (PNG) | 49.68 | Marie-Danielle Teanyouen (NCL) | 49.30 | (Wallis and Futuna) /Monika Fiafialoto (WLF) | 47.12 |
| Heptathlon | Iammo Launa (PNG) | 5018 GR | Lillyanne Beining (PNG) | 4751 | (French Polynesia) /Véronique Boyer (TAH) | 4573 |
| 4 x 100 metres relay | Fiji; Rachael Rogers; Vaciseva Tavaga; Litea Tawai; Rosi Tamani | 47.78 | New Caledonia; Laure Uedre; Edith Kamin; Christelle Oiremoin; Ghislaine Saint-Prix | 48.18 | Tonga; Siulolo Liku; Malia Makisi; Soana Ma'upesea; Lusia Pule'ang | 49.73 |
| 4 x 400 metres relay | Papua New Guinea; Mary Unido; Lily Tua; Barbara Sapea; Tahiri Homerang | 3:50.50 GR | Fiji; Rachael Rogers; Vaciseva Tavaga; Rosi Tamani; Della Shaw | 3:58.44 | Tonga; Vasa Tulahe; Lusia Pule'anga; Siulolo Liku; Malia Makisi | 4:01.48 |

== Medal table (unofficial) ==
* Host nation (Papua New Guinea)

| Rank | Nation | Gold | Silver | Bronze | Total |
|---|---|---|---|---|---|
| 1 | Fiji (FIJ) | 10 | 13 | 8 | 31 |
| 2 | New Caledonia (NCL) | 9 | 9 | 4 | 22 |
| 3 | Papua New Guinea (PNG)* | 9 | 8 | 10 | 27 |
| 4 | French Polynesia (TAH) | 5 | 5 | 5 | 15 |
| 5 | Guam (GUM) | 4 | 2 | 2 | 8 |
| 6 | Vanuatu (VAN) | 3 | 1 | 1 | 5 |
| 7 | Western Samoa (WSM) | 1 | 0 | 0 | 1 |
| 8 | Wallis and Futuna (WLF) | 0 | 2 | 3 | 5 |
| 9 | Norfolk Island (NFK) | 0 | 1 | 0 | 1 |
| 10 | Tonga (TON) | 0 | 0 | 7 | 7 |
| 11 | American Samoa (ASA) | 0 | 0 | 1 | 1 |
| Totals (11 entries) | | 41 | 41 | 41 | 123 |

== Participation (unofficial) ==
Athletes from the following 16 countries were reported to participate:

- American Samoa
- Cook Islands
- Fiji
- Guam
- Nauru
- New Caledonia
- Niue
- Norfolk Island
- Northern Mariana Islands
- Papua New Guinea
- Solomon Islands
- (French Polynesia) /Tahiti
- Tonga
- Vanuatu
- /Wallis and Futuna
- Western Samoa
