= 1990 Oceania Athletics Championships =

I Oceania Athletics Championships
- Dates: July 11–14
- Host city: Suva, Fiji
- Venue: National Stadium
- Level: Senior
- Events: 38 (22 men, 16 women)

The 1990 Oceania Athletics Championships were held at the National Stadium in Suva, Fiji, between July 11–14, 1990.

A total of 38 events were contested, 22 by men and 16 by women.

Athletes from the French overseas territories in the South Pacific were only admitted as guests.

== Medal summary ==
Medal winners were published.

=== Men ===
Event	Gold		Silver		Bronze	
100 metres	Joseph Onika; Solomon Islands	10.75	Subul Babo; Papua New Guinea	10.83	Jone Delai; Fiji	10.92
200 metres	Subul Babo; Papua New Guinea	21.60	Joseph Onika; Solomon Islands	21.87	Peauope Suli; Tonga	22.04
400 metres	Alex Soqosoqo; Fiji	48.31	Braeman Yee; Fiji	48.45	Philip Harrison; New Zealand	49.36
800 metres	Derek Renz; New Zealand	1:53.33	Lui Muavesi; Fiji	1:54.03	David Savidan; New Zealand	1:54.21
1500 metres	Derek Renz; New Zealand	3:58.58	Jamie Strudley; New Zealand	3:59.61	Wally Plath; Australia	4:01.88
5000 metres	Duane Humphreys; New Zealand	15:09.87	Paul Ashford; Australia	15:17.87	Davendra Singh; Fiji	15:19.53
10000 metres	Adrian Wellington; Australia	32:08.46	Paul Ashford; Australia	32:42.16	Aaron Dupnai; Papua New Guinea	32:52.62
Marathon	Grant McEwen; New Zealand	2:30:31	Adrian Wellington; Australia	2:31:03	Mervyn Shields; New Zealand	2:36:34
3000 metres steeplechase	Duane Humphreys; New Zealand	9:12.83	Davendra Singh; Fiji	9:21.80	Wayne Hellmuth; Australia	9:29.97
110 metres hurdles^{†}	Robert McNeill; New Zealand	15.39	Johnathan Schmidt; New Zealand	15.51	Homelo Vi; Tonga	15.80
400 metres hurdles	Johnathan Schmidt; New Zealand	52.83	Paeaki Tukaunove Kokohu; Tonga	54.30	Joe Rodan; Fiji	54.33
High jump	Ray Featherstone; New Zealand	2.06	Joe Ellul; Australia	1.94	Jale Waivure; Fiji	1.94
Pole vault	Marcus Pointon; New Zealand	4.40	Alona Finau; Tonga; Homelo Vi; Tonga	2.70		
Long jump	Simon Raynes; New Zealand	7.21	Gabriele Qoro; Fiji	7.13	Aaron Langdon; New Zealand	7.02
Triple jump	Simon Raynes; New Zealand	14.66	Scott Newman; New Zealand	14.44	Shane Stuart; Australia	14.21
Shot put	Douglas Mace; New Zealand	15.60	Cameron McLaughlan; Australia	14.89	Kevin Galea; Australia	14.86
Discus throw	Ian Boller; Australia	47.80	Chris Mene; New Zealand	46.96	Nathan Tait; New Zealand	44.04
Hammer throw	Douglas Mace; New Zealand	57.50	Patrick Hellier; New Zealand	50.04	Vainga Tonga; Cook Islands	28.74
Javelin throw	James Goulding; Fiji	71.54	Jioji Nadavo; Fiji	63.14	Ian Swarbrick; Australia	62.12
20 Kilometres Road Walk	Paul McElwee; New Zealand	1:39:46	Dean Nipperess; Australia	1:54:15	Caleb Maybir; Fiji	1:54:34
4 x 100 metres relay	Fiji; Tonga	41.97			Papua New Guinea	42.40
4 x 400 metres relay	Fiji	3:15.29	Papua New Guinea	3:17.80	Tonga	3:20.05

^{†}: The 110 m hurdles event was won by Albert Chambonnier from New Caledonia in 15.35 s running as a guest.

=== Women ===
Event	Gold		Silver		Bronze	
100 metres	Bindee Goonchew; Australia	12.17	Heather Shanks; New Zealand	12.27	Vaciseva Tavaga; Fiji	12.37
200 metres	Bindee Goonchew; Australia	25.30	Chantal Brunner; New Zealand	25.37	Heather Shanks; New Zealand	25.40
400 metres	Kirsten Downie; New Zealand	56.11	Melindy Smith; Australia	56.35	Joanne Todd; New Zealand	57.83
800 metres	Helen Hawley; New Zealand	2:09.35	Sally Lee; Australia	2:12.31	Manuela Primavera; Australia	2:16.59
1500 metres	Helen Hawley; New Zealand	4:33.17	Wendy Cottrell; New Zealand	4:37.38	Manuela Primavera; Australia	4:38.64
3000 metres	Wendy Cottrell; New Zealand	10:01.72	Manuela Primavera; Australia	10:18.74	Jen Allred; Guam	10:20.88
20 Kilometres Road Race^{†}	Lee-Ann McPhillips; New Zealand	1:22:22	Jen Allred; Guam	1:27:10	Carol Porter; Australia	1:31:12
100 metres hurdles	Katie Ackerman; Australia	14.67	Sarah Lynn; New Zealand	15.26	Lillyanne Beining; Papua New Guinea	15.49
400 metres hurdles	Lily Tua; Papua New Guinea	64.31	Megan Minehane; Australia	64.87	Janiene Ashbridge; New Zealand	67.45
High jump	Carmel Corbett; New Zealand	1.77	Shelley Stoddart; New Zealand	1.77	Katie Ackerman; Australia	1.68
Long jump	Katie Ackerman; Australia	6.01	Chantal Brunner; New Zealand	5.85	Shelley Stoddart; New Zealand	5.46
Shot put	Tania Lutton; New Zealand	13.52	Iammo Launa; Papua New Guinea	12.87	Elizabeth Binns; New Zealand	12.33
Discus throw	Jeanette Park; New Zealand	47.02	Tania Lutton; New Zealand	38.20	Mereoni Vibose; Fiji	38.08
Javelin throw (old implement)	Mereoni Vibose; Fiji	48.70	Iammo Launa; Papua New Guinea	48.02	Shane Edgerton; Australia	44.28
4 x 100 metres relay	New Zealand	47.92	Australia	48.56	Fiji	48.59
4 x 400 metres relay	Australia	3:55.73	New Zealand	3:57.83	Fiji	4:03.73

^{†}: The women's 20 kilometres road race event was won by Nadia Prasad from New Caledonia in 1:20:32 running as a guest.

== Medal table (unofficial) ==
* Host nation (Fiji)

Rank	Nation	Gold	Silver	Bronze	Total
1	New Zealand	23	13	10	46
2	Australia	7	11	10	28
3	Fiji*	5	5	9	19
4	Papua New Guinea	2	4	3	9
5	Tonga	1	3	3	7
6	Solomon Islands	1	1	0	2
7	Guam	0	1	1	2
8	Cook Islands	0	0	1	1
Totals (8 entries)		39	38	37	114
