= Athletics at the 1987 South Pacific Games =

Athletics at the VIII South Pacific Games
- Dates: December 9–18
- Host city: Nouméa, New Caledonia
- Venue: Stade Numa-Daly Magenta
- Level: Senior
- Events: 38 (22 men, 16 women)
- Participation: 11 nations
- Records set: 25

Athletics competitions at the 1987 South Pacific Games were held at the Stade Numa-Daly Magenta in Nouméa, New Caledonia, between December 9–18, 1987.

A total of 38 events were contested, 22 by men and 16 by women.

== Medal summary ==
Medal winners and their results were published on the Athletics Weekly webpage courtesy of Tony Isaacs and Børre Lilloe, and on the Oceania Athletics Association webpage by Bob Snow.

Complete results can also be found on the Oceania Athletics Association webpage by Bob Snow.

=== Men ===
Event	Gold		Silver		Bronze	
100 metres (wind: -2.6 m/s)	Jean Fantozzi (NCL)	10.98	Takale Tuna (PNG)	11.21	Peauope Suli (TGA)	11.22
200 metres (wind: -0.8 m/s)	Takale Tuna (PNG)	22.10	Rudy Brizard (NCL)	22.20	Peauope Suli (TGA)	22.25
400 metres	Takale Tuna (PNG)	49.14	Joe Rodan (FIJ)	49.50	Fosa Torea (PNG)	49.74
800 metres	Alain Lazare (NCL)	1:55.73	Semi Vuetibau (FIJ)	1:56.17	Lui Muavesi (FIJ)	1:56.21
1500 metres	Alain Lazare (NCL)	3:50.27 GR	(French Polynesia) /Pascal Adams (PYF)	4:00.11	Binesh Prasad (FIJ)	4:01.62
5000 metres	Alain Lazare (NCL)	14:15.12 GR	(French Polynesia) /Pascal Adams (PYF)	15:20.21	Aaron Dupnai (PNG)	15:23.36
10000 metres	Alain Lazare (NCL)	30:59.99 GR	Aaron Dupnai (PNG)	32:28.63	Shiri Chand (FIJ)	33:14.16
Marathon	Alain Lazare (NCL)	2:26:58 GR	Aaron Dupnai (PNG)	2:32:56	Yannick Moglia (NCL)	2:41.06
3000 metres steeplechase	Alain Lazare (NCL)	9:07.11 GR	Davendra Singh (FIJ)	9:32.16	(French Polynesia) /Pascal Adams (PYF)	9:38.49
110 metres hurdles (wind: -1.2 m/s)	(French Polynesia) /Robert Tupuhoé (PYF)	14.76	Albert Miller (FIJ)	14.80	(French Polynesia) /Glenn Barff (PYF)	15.04
400 metres hurdles	(French Polynesia) /Robert Tupuhoé (PYF)	52.37 GR	Edmond Humuni (NCL)	53.03	(French Polynesia) /Yves Martin (PYF)	53.06
High jump	Clément Poaniewa (NCL)	2.02	(French Polynesia) /Jean-Luc Ebbs (PYF)	1.98	Guillaume Vendegou (NCL)	1.96
Pole vault	(French Polynesia) /Jean-Luc Mu Kwai Chuan (PYF)	4.60 GR	Gaël Marlier (NCL)	4.55	(French Polynesia) /Thierry Tekuataoa (PYF)	4.35
Long jump	Steeve Druminy (NCL)	7.39 GR (wind: +1.3 m/s)	Jean-Jacques Honda (NCL)	7.27 w (wind: +2.1 m/s)	Setiliki Mateialona (TGA)	6.99 w (wind: +2.2 m/s)
Triple jump	Jean Fantozzi (NCL)	15.73 GR (wind: +2.0 m/s)	Steeve Druminy (NCL)	15.53 w (wind: +2.9 m/s)	(French Polynesia) /Thierry Temauri (PYF)	14.49 w (wind: +2.4 m/s)
Shot put	Soane Suve (NCL)	15.97	Pierre Alexandrine (NCL)	15.36	Sanitesi Latu (TGA)	14.75
Discus throw	(French Polynesia) /Gordon Barff (PYF)	51.30 GR	Martial Bone (NCL)	47.20	Frédéric Cassier (NCL)	44.72
Hammer throw	Soane Lakafia (NCL)	57.90 GR	Frédéric Cassier (NCL)	55.52	Pierre-Chanel Sao (NCL)	49.88
Javelin throw (new specification)	Jean-Paul Lakafia (NCL)	78.96 GR	(Wallis and Futuna) /Fapiano Fakataulavelua (WLF)	77.36	Péta Tauhavili (NCL)	75.00
Decathlon^{†}	Albert Miller (FIJ)	7019	(French Polynesia) /Glenn Barff (PYF)	6319 w	Ferdinand Nongkas (PNG)	5722
4 x 100 metres relay	New Caledonia; Christophe Simonin; Remy Chenu; Rudy Brizard; Jean Fantozzi	41.07 GR	Tonga; Cedric Mateialona; Peni‘Akau Loloa; Sitaneli Mafi; Peauope Suli	41.64	Papua New Guinea; Emmanuel Mack; John Hou; David Susame; Takale Tuna	41.71
4 x 400 metres relay	Fiji; Henry Rogo; Braeman Yee; Lui Muavesi; Joe Rodan	3:17.46	Papua New Guinea; John Hou; Takale Tuna; Clement Taipala; Fosa Torea	3:18.99	New Caledonia; Thelisse; Rudy Brizard; Edmond Humuni; Samuel Pellan	3:21.13

^{†}: Albert Miller’s score of 7019 points in Decathlon was achieved with a wind assisted (+5.2 m/s) Long Jump of 6.82m. Taking his best legal jump of 6.69m (+2.1) his score becomes 6989 points - a New Games Record.

=== Women ===
Event	Gold		Silver		Bronze	
100 metres (wind: -1.2 m/s)	Ghislaine Saint-Prix (NCL)	12.62	(French Polynesia) /Albertine An (PYF)	12.63	Laure Uedre (NCL)	12.81
200 metres (wind: -0.3 m/s)	Brigitte Hardel (NCL)	24.62 GR	(French Polynesia) /Albertine An (PYF)	25.41	Laure Uedre (NCL)	25.69
400 metres	Brigitte Hardel (NCL)	56.32 GR	Kanai Koniel (PNG)	59.41	Véronique Becker (NCL)	59.64
800 metres	Patricia Rouby (NCL)	2:15.58 GR	Nadia Bernard (NCL)	2:17.33	(French Polynesia) /Marie-Line Marraud (PYF)	2:18.51
1500 metres	Nadia Bernard (NCL)	4:35.94 GR	Poloni Avek (PNG)	4:45.71	Kelea Vetuku (FIJ)	4:50.94
3000 metres	Nadia Bernard (NCL)	10:03.46 GR	Poloni Avek (PNG)	10:34.44	(French Polynesia) /Teroro Meyer (PYF)	10:35.67
100 metres hurdles (wind: -0.7 m/s)	(French Polynesia) /Albertine An (PYF)	14.37 GR	Brigitte Hardel (NCL)	14.47	Sainiana Tukana (FIJ)	15.15
400 metres hurdles	Brigitte Hardel (NCL)	60.96 GR	Sainiana Tukana (FIJ)	61.90	(French Polynesia) /Léonne Ley (PYF)	63.09
High jump	(French Polynesia) /Albertine An (PYF)	1.65	Annie Tokona (FIJ)	1.63	Dionne Gardner (NFK)	1.63
Long jump	Brigitte Hardel (NCL)	5.92 (wind: +1.2 m/s)	(French Polynesia) /Albertine An (PYF)	5.77 w (wind: +2.4 m/s)	Corinne Martin (NCL)	5.63 w (wind: +2.5 m/s)
Shot put	Siu Ivakuka (TGA)	14.00 GR	Marie-Danielle Teanyouen (NCL)	13.75	Marie-Christine Fakaté (NCL)	13.67
Discus throw	Marie-Christine Fakaté (NCL)	46.42	(French Polynesia) /Sandra Pito (PYF)	45.22	Marie-Lucie Pauga (NCL)	43.28
Javelin throw	Mereoni Vibose (FIJ)	52.26	Anna Tulitau (NCL)	50.04	(French Polynesia) /Diane Méaméa (PYF)	49.16
Heptathlon	Sainiana Tukana (FIJ)	4822 GR	(French Polynesia) /Albertine An (PYF)	4817	Iammo Launa (PNG)	4772
4 x 100 metres relay	New Caledonia; Laure Uedre; Corinne Martin; Brigitte Hardel; Ghislaine Saint-Prix	47.32 GR	/French Polynesia; Jessie Manutahi; Aimata Leroy; Sandra Yansaud; Albertine An	47.64	Papua New Guinea; Yal Jonathan; Kanai Koniel; Barbara Sapea; Iammo Launa	48.52
4 x 400 metres relay	New Caledonia; Catherine Uedre; Patricia Rouby; Véronique Becker; Brigitte Hardel	3:52.58 GR	/French Polynesia; Véronique Boyer; Katia Sanford; Marie-Line Marraud; Léonne Ley	3:59.53	Papua New Guinea; Gisung Ngalau; Barbara Sapea; Lily Tua; Kanai Koniel	3:59.54

== Medal table (unofficial) ==
* Host nation (New Caledonia)

Rank	Nation	Gold	Silver	Bronze	Total
1	New Caledonia (NCL)*	25	12	12	49
2	French Polynesia (PYF)	6	11	9	26
3	Fiji (FIJ)	4	6	5	15
4	Papua New Guinea (PNG)	2	7	7	16
5	Tonga (TON)	1	1	4	6
6	Wallis and Futuna (WLF)	0	1	0	1
7	Norfolk Island (NFK)	0	0	1	1
Totals (7 entries)		38	38	38	114

== Participation (unofficial) ==
Athletes from the following 11 countries were reported to participate:

- American Samoa
- Cook Islands
- Fiji
- /French Polynesia
- Guam
- New Caledonia
- Norfolk Island
- Northern Mariana Islands
- Papua New Guinea
- Tonga
- /Wallis and Futuna
