= List of Solomon Islands records in athletics =

The following are the national records in athletics in the Solomon Islands maintained by the Solomon Islands' national athletics federation: Athletic Solomons (AS).

== Outdoor ==
Key to tables: Awaiting ratification Record not kept by AS Not ratified or later rescinded by AS

=== Men ===
Event	Record	Athlete	Date	Meet	Place	Ref.
100 m	10.75	Joseph Onika	11 July 1990	Oceania Championships	Suva, Fiji	
100 m	10.6 h	Jim Marau	7 June 1975		Honiara, British Solomon Islands	
200 m	21.85 (−0.7 m/s)	Chris Walasi	14 December 2005		Hamilton, New Zealand	
400 m	47.76	Chris Walasi	27 January 2006		Christchurch, New Zealand	
800 m	1:52.64	Charlie Oliver	5 October 1982	Commonwealth Games	Brisbane, Australia	
1500 m	4:00.95	Selwyn Kole	20 August 1997	South Pacific Mini Games	Tafuna, American Samoa	
2000 m	6:43.1 h	Joe Tiba	2 December 1995		Honiara, Solomon Islands	
3000 m	8:51.5 h	Chris Votu	23 May 1998		Port Vila, Vanuatu	
5000 m	15:33.8 h	Chris Votu	27 April 2003	Melanesian Regional Championships	Lae, Papua New Guinea	
10,000 m	32:44.0 h	Chris Votu	26 April 2003	Melanesian Regional Championships	Lae, Papua New Guinea	
Half marathon	1:13:41	Henry Foufaka	12 December 2002		Christchurch, New Zealand	
Half marathon	1:13:01	Henry Foufaka	12 July 2003	South Pacific Games	Suva, Fiji	
Marathon	2:36:16	Mackay Talasasa	8 October 1982	Commonwealth Games	Brisbane, Australia	
110 m hurdles	16.21 NWI	Alfred Selwyn	15 September 1971	South Pacific Games	Pirae, French Polynesia	
110 m hurdles	15.6 h NWI	Alfred Selwyn	8 March 1969		Suva, Fiji	
400 m hurdles	1:00.97	Frazer Kokomana	8 September 1983	South Pacific Games	Apia, Western Samoa	
400 m hurdles	57.0 h	Alfred Selwyn	13 September 1971	South Pacific Games	Pirae, French Polynesia	
3000 m steeplechase	9:34.86	Primo Higa	16 August 1997	South Pacific Mini Games	Tafuna, American Samoa	
High jump	1.90 m	Toswell Tahisu	1972		Honiara, British Solomon Islands	
Pole vault	3.70 m	Leonard Nonifi	26 August 1989	South Pacific Mini Games	Nukuʻalofa, Tonga	
Long jump	7.35 m NWI	Ian Chapangi	25 September 1993		Honiara, Solomon Islands	
Triple jump	14.48 m NWI	George Fafale	18 August 1969	South Pacific Games	Port Moresby, Papua and New Guinea	
Shot put	13.49 m	Michael Meone	1971		Honiara, British Solomon Islands	
Discus throw	41.82 m	Ezekiel Rangi	20 March 1999		Honiara, Solomon Islands	
Hammer throw						
Javelin throw	60.58 m (new design)	Ezekiel Rangi	26 September 2013		Tulagi, Solomon Islands	
Javelin throw	61.00 m (old design)	Sylvester Diake	31 August 1976		Nouméa, New Caledonia	
Decathlon	5468 pts	Leonard Nonifi	25–26 August 1989	South Pacific Mini Games	Nukuʻalofa, Tonga	
Decathlon	100m / Long jump / Shot put / High jump / 400m / 110m H / Discus / Pole vault / Javelin / 1500m; 11.90 / 6.27 m w / 8.60 m / 1.74 m / 52.89 / 16.57 / 23.26 m / 3.70 m / 37.90 m / 5:04.31					
Decathlon	5584 pts (Note: no details available for a conversion from 1962 to 1984 tables)	James Iroga	2 April 1983		Suva, Fiji	
Decathlon	100m / Long jump / Shot put / High jump / 400m / 110m H / Discus / Pole vault / Javelin / 1500m					
20 km walk (road)						
50 km walk (road)						
4 × 100 m relay	41.55	Solomon Islands; Nelson Kabitana; Jack Iroga; Francis Manioru; Chris Walasi	8 September 2007	Pacific Games	Apia, Samoa	
4 × 400 m relay	3:19.35	Solomon Islands; Geoffrey Nimanima; Aaron Hitu; Frank Hana; John Waokahi	8 September 1979	South Pacific Games	Suva, Fiji	

=== Women ===
Event	Record	Athlete	Date	Meet	Place	Ref.
100 m	12.64 (+0.3 m/s)	Jenny Keni	23 August 2003	World Championships	Saint-Denis, France	
100 m	12.3 h NWI	Jenny Keni	3 August 2004		Cairns, Australia	
200 m	26.35 NWI	Flory Liza	15 October 2008	Commonwealth Youth Games	Pune, India	
200 m	25.6 h NWI	Jenny Keni	1 August 2004		Cairns, Australia	
400 m	58.88	Samantha Rofo	7 July 2016	Melanesian Championships	Suva, Fiji	
800 m	2:19.94	Dorothy Daonanita	24 February 1994	Oceania Championships	Auckland, New Zealand	
1000 m	3:25.2 h	Elsie Daiwo	29 May 1998		Suva, Fiji	
1500 m	4:52.63	Sharon Firisua	31 October 2015		Melbourne, Australia	
Mile	5:16.5 h	Sharon Firisua	23 February 2016	Victorian Mile Championship	Melbourne, Australia	
3000 m	10:26.01	Sharon Firisua	23 February 2016	Shield Final	Melbourne, Australia	
5000 m	18:01.62	Sharon Firisua	16 August 2016	Olympic Games	Rio de Janeiro, Brazil	
10,000 m	37:54.60	Sharon Firisua	1 July 2017	Oceania Championships	Suva, Fiji	
Half marathon	1:41:02	Dianah Matekali	2004		Honiara, Solomon Islands	
Half marathon	1:29:26	Sharon Firisua	18 July 2015	Pacific Games	Port Moresby, Papua New Guinea	
Half marathon	1:27:31	Sharon Firisua	14 December 2017	Pacific Mini Games	Port Vila, Vanuatu	
Marathon	3:02:10	Sharon Firisua	7 August 2021	Olympic Games	Sapporo, Japan	
100 m hurdles	21.8 h NWI	Janet Faiga	14 September 1971	South Pacific Games	Pirae, French Polynesia	
400 m hurdles						
3000 m steeplechase	11:27.42	Sharon Firisua	10 May 2015	Oceania Championships	Cairns, Australia	
High jump	1.45 m	Roselyn Mason	1973		Honiara, British Solomon Islands	
High jump	1.45 m	Agnetha V	25 April 1995		Honiara, Solomon Islands	
Pole vault						
Long jump	5.13 m (+1.3 m/s)	Jovita Arunia	25 October 2023	Solomon Island Championships	Honiara, Solomon Islands	
Triple jump	8.74 m NWI	Rose Sisiolo	25 June 2011		Tenaru, Guadalcanal, Solomon Islands	
Shot put	10.67 m	Saleima Kataina	9 November 1981		Honiara, Solomon Islands	
Discus throw	29.28 m	Susy Qila	1 May 1976		Honiara, British Solomon Islands	
Hammer throw						
Javelin throw	29.35 m (new design)	Mitchellian Liliau	19–26 June 2004		Honiara, Solomon Islands	
Javelin throw	30.30 m (old design)	Saleima Kataina	10 September 1983		Apia, Western Samoa	
Heptathlon						
Heptathlon	100m H / High jump / Shot put / 200m / Long jump / Javelin / 800m					
20 km walk (road)						
50 km walk (road)						
4 × 100 m relay	49.69	Solomon Islands; Jovita Arunia; Hilda Kewono; Elsie Laise; Fredah Kahige	29 November 2023	Pacific Games	Honiara, Solomon Islands	
4 × 400 m relay	4:08.03	Solomon Islands; Joycelyn Taurikeni; June Fataea; Liza Flory; Pauline Kwalea	8 September 2007	Pacific Games	Apia, Samoa	

== Indoor ==
=== Men ===
Event	Record	Athlete	Date	Meet	Place	Ref.
60 m	7.07	Francis Manioru	10 March 2006	World Championships	Moscow, Russia	
200 m	23.13	Silas Helo	5 March 1999	World Championships	Maebashi, Japan	
400 m						
800 m						
1500 m						
3000 m	9:03.84	Chris Votu	14 March 2003	World Championships	Birmingham, United Kingdom	
60 m hurdles						
High jump						
Pole vault						
Long jump						
Triple jump						
Shot put						
Heptathlon						
Heptathlon	60m / Long jump / Shot put / High jump / 60m H / Pole vault / 1000m					
5000 m walk						
4 × 400 m relay						

=== Women ===
Event	Record	Athlete	Date	Meet	Place	Ref.
60 m	8.19	Jovita Arunia	2 March 2024	World Championships	Glasgow, United Kingdom	
200 m						
400 m						
800 m						
1500 m						
3000 m	10:28.34	Sharon Firisua	18 September 2017	Asian Indoor and Martial Arts Games	Ashgabat, Turkmenistan	
60 m hurdles						
High jump						
Pole vault						
Long jump						
Triple jump						
Shot put						
Pentathlon						
Pentathlon	60m H / High jump / Shot put / Long jump / 800m					
3000 m walk						
4 × 400 m relay						
