= List of French Polynesian records in athletics =

The following are the national records in athletics in French Polynesia maintained by French Polynesian's national athletics federation: Fédération d'Athlétisme de Polynésie Française (FAPF).

== Outdoor ==
Key to tables: Awaiting ratification Record not kept by FAPF Not ratified or later rescined by FAPF

# = not ratified by federation

=== Men ===
Event	Record	Athlete	Date	Meet	Place	Ref.
100 m	10.52	Jean Bourne	21 July 1972		Colombes, France	
100 m	10.3 h	Jean Bourne	10 May 1968		Papeete, French Polynesia	
200 m	21.60	Robert Tupuhoé	28 August 1989	South Pacific Mini Games	Nuku'alofa, Tonga	
200 m	21.1 h (Note: not officially recognised by World Athletics)	Jean Bourne	28 July 1968		Colombes, France	
400 m	47.13	Isaac Yaya	26 June 2005		Nice, France	
800 m	1:53.28	Pascal Adams	8 July 1987		Colombes, France	
1000 m	2:29.6+	Pascal Adams	27 March 1987		Poissy, France	
1500 m	3:51.36	Charles Delys	30 August 2011	World Championships	Daegu, South Korea	
2000 m	5:40.41	Pascal Adams	27 March 1987		Pirae, French Polynesia	
3000 m	8:27.4 h	Charles Delys	3 August 2011		Pirae, French Polynesia	
5000 m	14:41.6 h	Pascal Adams	31 July 1988		Saint-Maur, France	
10,000 m	31:32.87	Georges Richmond	30 April 2003		Pirae, French Polynesia	
10 km (road)	31:59	Charles Delys	22 January 2011			
One hour	16350 m+	Gilles Julien	5 April 1975		Pirae, French Polynesia	
Half marathon	1:08:44	Georges Richemond	3 October 1993		Brussels, Belgium	
20 km (road)	1:13:29	Gilles Julien	5 April 1975		Pirae, French Polynesia	
Marathon	2:25:28	Jean-Louis Bounhoure	7 August 1983		Saint-Jean-de-Monts, Vendée, France	
110 m hurdles	14.51 (+1.3 m/s)	Toriki Urarii	8 September 2007	South Pacific Games	Apia, Samoa	
110 m hurdles	14.4 h	Robert Tupuhoé	15 August 1991		Pirae, French Polynesia	
400 m hurdles	50.90	Robert Tupuhoé	11 April 1987		Pirae, French Polynesia	
2000 m steeplechase	6:25.6 h	Hubert Gobrait	1984		Pirae, French Polynesia	
3000 m steeplechase	9:38.49	Pascal Adams	16 December 1987	South Pacific Games	Nouméa, New Caledonia	
High jump	2.15 m	Pierre Léontieff-Téahu	17 June 1973		Vittel, France	
Pole vault	5.13 m	Thibaut Cattiau	4 March 1989		Pirae, French Polynesia	
Long jump	8.01 m (+0.9 m/s) (Note: outdoor best; indoor mark ratified as absolute record)	Raihau Maiau	9 August 2025	Robert Emmiyan Cup	Artashat, Armenia	
Triple jump	15.44 m (Note: officially recognised, but Baudoin is from Guadeloupe and therefore ineligible for French Polynesia)	Didier Baudoin	17 February 1989		Pirae, French Polynesia	
Triple jump	14.95 m (+0.8 m/s)	Apolosi Foliaki	26 February 1994	Oceania Championships	Auckland, New Zealand	
Shot put	19.82 m # (Note: indoor mark ratified as absolute record)	Tumutai Dauphin^{†}	10 June 2015		Grenoble, France	
Shot put	19.76 m #	Tumutai Dauphin^{†}	14 June 2013		Bourg-en-Bresse, France	
Shot put	19.14 m #	Tumutai Dauphin^{†}	17 July 2015	Pacific Games	Port Moresby, Papua New Guinea	
Shot put	18.93 m #	Tumutai Dauphin^{†}	8 September 2011	Pacific Games	Nouméa, New Caledonia	
Shot put	18.46 m #	Jean-Claude Duhazé	26 May 1979		Pirae, French Polynesia	
Discus throw	57.92 m	Jean-Claude Duhazé	17 August 1979		Pirae, French Polynesia	
Hammer throw	58.10 m	Jean-Claude Duhazé	5 May 1979		Pirae, French Polynesia	
Javelin throw	66.42 m (old design) (Note: not officially recognized by World Athletics; with old javelin and on 15 May 1979 by other sources)	Romaric Valefaakaga	15 May 1991		Pirae, French Polynesia	
Javelin throw	63.94 m (new design)	Joseph Leverd	26 March 1986 (Note: by World Athletics source; 26 March 1998 by other sources)		Pirae, French Polynesia	
Javelin throw	66.46 m # (old design)	Joseph Leverd	7 April 1986		Pirae, French Polynesia	
Decathlon	6583 pts h	Robert Tupuhoé	29-30 April 1986 (Note: by World Athletics source; 28–29 March 1986 by federation source)		Pirae, French Polynesia	
Decathlon	100m / Long jump / Shot put / High jump / 400m / 110m H / Discus / Pole vault / Javelin / 1500m; 10.8 / 6.58 m / 9.14 m / 1.75 m / 49.1 / 15.1 / 32.46 m / 4.30 m / 46.90 m / 4:56.6					
20 km walk (road)						
50 km walk (road)						
4 × 100 m relay	41.8 h	French Polynesia; John Salmon; Alexandre Aunoa; Jean Bourne; Charles Tetaria	11 September 1971	South Pacific Games	Pirae, French Polynesia	
4 × 200 m relay	1:28.2 h	French Polynesia; Pouliquen; Tupuhoe; Amaru; Manuel	15 March 1985		Pirae, French Polynesia	
4 × 400 m relay	3:20.45	French Polynesia; Jeffrey-Tamatoa Laibe; Simon Thieury; Teiva Brinkfield; Isaac Yaya	8 September 2007	South Pacific Games	Apia, Samoa	
4 × 800 m relay	8:15.7 h	Central Sport; Ferre; Vongey; Bourret; Escande	15 April 1992		Pirae, French Polynesia	
4 × 1500 m relay	17:36.4 h	Aorai; Deviville; H. Gobrait; Harehoe; R Gobrait	19 January 1985		Pirae, French Polynesia	

^{†}: Transferred allegiance to France (not eligible for Oceania competitions)

=== Women ===
Event	Record	Athlete	Date	Meet	Place	Ref.
100 m	11.95	Albertine An	24 July 1988		Le Touquet, France	
100 m	11.8 h	Albertine An	1988			
200 m	24.60	Albertine An	8 July 1987		Colombes, France	
200 m	24.4 h	Danièle Guyonnet	1987			
400 m	57.39	Cécile Tiatia	30 May 2004		Pirae, French Polynesia	
400 m	57.36 (Note: not recognised by World Athletics)	Takina Bernardino	19 June 2016		Valence, France	
800 m	2:13.62	Marie-Line Marraud	5 May 1988		Pirae, French Polynesia	
1000 m	2:56.8 h	Vaite Bounhoure	26 April 2003		Pirae, French Polynesia	
1500 m	4:36.13	Stéphanie Nonotte	12 July 2003	South Pacific Games	Suva, Fiji	
2000 m	7:07.18	Astrid Montuclard	8 May 2010		Pirae, French Polynesia	
3000 m	9:34.63 #	Stéphanie Nonotte	22 May 2005		Tourlaville, France	
3000 m	10:33.2 h	Teroro Meyer	22 June 1988		Saint-Maur, France	
5000 m	18:05.66	Vaite Bounhoure	21 March 2003		Dunedin, New Zealand	
10,000 m	38:48.45	Sophie Gardon	5 September 2007	Pacific Games	Apia, Samoa	
Half marathon	1:19.35	Patricia Gauquelin	16 December 2006		Apia, Samoa	
Half marathon	1:26.41	Sophie Gardon	1 June 2003		Tautira, French Polynesia	
Marathon	2:49:12	Sophie Gardon	12 February 2006		Moorea, French Polynesia	
100 m hurdles	13.69	Albertine An	31 July 1988		Fontainebleau, France	
400 m hurdles	59.42	Katia Sanford	9 July 1989		Créteil, France	
2000 m steeplechase	7:18.16	Astrid Montuclard	3 March 2012		Papeete, French Polynesia	
3000 m steeplechase	11:07.55	Heiata Brinkfield	6 September 2011	Pacific Games	Nouméa, New Caledonia	
High jump	1.86 m	Danièle Guyonnet	7 August 1977		Zofingen, Switzerland	
Pole vault	3.01 m	Lucie Tepea	30 May 2009		Punaruu, French Polynesia	
Long jump	5.94 m (+0.6 m/s)	Véronique Boyer	7 April 2001		Pirae, French Polynesia	
Triple jump	12.83 m (+1.5 m/s)	Véronique Boyer	12 July 2003	South Pacific Games	Suva, Fiji	
Shot put	13.77 m	Margareth Bringold	18 August 1995		Pirae, French Polynesia	
Discus throw	48.08 m	Sandra Pito	12 August 1988		Tours, France	
Hammer throw	36.42 m	Manuela Heitz	9 June 2004		Pirae, French Polynesia	
Hammer throw	36.74 m #	Sandra Bordes	14 January 2006		Pirae, French Polynesia	
Javelin throw	45.95 m (new design)	Teuruerani Tanepau	29 June 2009		Pirae, French Polynesia	
Javelin throw	49.16 m (old design)	Diane Meamea	10 December 1987	South Pacific Games	Nouméa, New Caledonia	
Heptathlon	5456 pts h	Véronique Boyer	19-20 May 2001		Pirae, French Polynesia	
Heptathlon	100m H / High jump / Shot put / 200m / Long jump / Javelin / 800m; 14.21 / 1.81 m / 12.19 m / 25.8 / 5.60 m / 37.48 m / 2:29.44					
5000 m walk (track)	37:21.12	Georgia Parard	7 July 2010		Pirae, French Polynesia	
10 km walk (road)	38:16	Patricia Gauquelin	1 April 2010			
20 km walk (road)						
4 × 100 m relay	47.64	French Polynesia; Jessie Manutahi; Aimata Leroy; Sandra Yansaud; Albertine An	16 December 1987	South Pacific Games	Nouméa, New Caledonia	
4 × 200 m relay	1:46.1 h	Aorai; Jessie Manutahi; Sandra Yansaud; L. Manutahi; Albertine An	1 June 1983		Pirae, French Polynesia	
4 × 400 m relay	3:59.53	French Polynesia; Véronique Boyer; Katia Sanford; Marie Line Marraud; Léonne Ley	18 December 1987	South Pacific Games	Nouméa, New Caledonia	
4 × 800 m relay	10:18.1 h	Excelsior; V. Manutahi; Charles; Sophie Gardon; Gaillard	10 June 2000		Pirae, French Polynesia	
4 × 1500 m relay	21:55.1 h	Excelsior; V. Manutahi; Charles; Sophie Gardon; Gaillard	28 May 2000		Pirae, French Polynesia	

=== Mixed ===
Event	Record	Athletes	Date	Meet	Place	Ref.
4 × 400 m relay	3:39.68	French Polynesia; Timothee Aumard; Mihivai Atrewe; Pol-Elie Raoult; Kiara Gilroy	8 July 2025	Pacific Mini Games	Koror, Palau	

== Indoor ==
=== Men ===
Event	Record	Athlete	Date	Meet	Place	Ref.
50 m	6.03	Isaac Yaya	20 December 2003		Nice, France	
60 m	6.72	Raihau Maiau	4 February 2016		Nantes, France	
200 m	22.54	Simon Thieury	3 February 2008		Aubière, France	
400 m	48.45	Isaac Yaya	10 March 2006	World Championships	Moscow, Russia	
800 m	1:59.73	Teiva Brinkfield	4 February 2007		Nogent-sur-Oise, France	
1000 m	2:45.17	Tieva Brinkfield	8 December 2007		Reims, France	
1500 m	4:38.91	Teiva Brinkfield	16 December 2006		Reims, France	
3000 m						
50 m hurdles	7.13	Toriki Urarii	17 December 2011		Nice, France	
60 m hurdles	8.23	Toriki Urarii	11 January 2009		Metz, France	
High jump	1.96 m	Raihau Maiau	26 January 2014		Bompas, France	
Pole vault	4.50 m	Stanley Drollet	1969		France	
Long jump	8.02 m	Raihau Maiau	4 February 2016	University Championships	Nantes, France	
Triple jump	12.14 m	Isaac Yaya	20 December 2003		Nice, France	
Shot put	20.10 m	Tumatei Dauphin	21 February 2015		Aubière, France	
Heptathlon						
Heptathlon	60m / Long jump / Shot put / High jump / 60m H / Pole vault / 1000m					
5000 m walk						
4 × 400 m relay						

=== Women ===
Event	Record	Athlete	Date	Meet	Place	Ref.
60 m	8.01	Salome Pracht Kautz	5 February 2011		Eaubonne, France	
200 m						
400 m						
800 m	2:13.87 (Note: 2:13.37 by other sources)	Florence Joly	3 February 1991 (Note: 2 February 1991 by other sources)		Paris, France	
1500 m	4:58.18	Heiata Brinkfield	16 January 2011		Reims, France	
Mile	4:58.81	Heiata Brinkfield	3 February 2008		Nogent-sur-Oise, France	
3000 m	10:48.25	Heiata Brinkfield	19 December 2009		Reims, France	
60 m hurdles	8.92	Véronique Boyer	20 February 1993		Paris, France	
High jump	1.83 m	Daniéle Guyonnet	30 January 1976		Portland, United States	
Pole vault						
Long jump	5.77 m	Véronique Boyer	26 February 1994		Bordeaux, France	
Triple jump						
Shot put	12.23 m	Véronique Boyer	11 November 2004		Bompas, France	
Pentathlon	3797 pts	Véronique Boyer	10 January 2004		Bompas, France	
Pentathlon	60m H / High jump / Shot put / Long jump / 800m; 9.09 / 1.72 m / 12.23 m / 5.57 m / 2:35.07					
3000 m walk						
4 × 400 m relay						
