= 2003 Melanesian Championships in Athletics =

II Melanesian Championships in Athletics
- Dates: April 25–27
- Host city: Lae, Morobe Province, Papua New Guinea
- Level: Senior
- Events: 31 (18 men, 13 women)

The 2003 Melanesian Championships in Athletics took place between April 25–27, 2003. The event was held in Lae, Papua New Guinea in conjunction with the Papua New Guinea National Athletics Championships.

A total of 31 events were contested, 18 by men and 13 by women.

== Medal summary ==
Medal winners and their results were published on the Athletics Weekly webpage. Full results can be found on the Athletics Papua New Guinea webpage.

=== Men ===
Event	Gold		Silver		Bronze	
100 metres (wind: -1.8 m/s)	Wagui Anau; Australia	10.5 CR	John Lum Kon; Fiji	10.6	Peter Pulu; Papua New Guinea	10.6
200 metres (wind: -0.4 m/s)	Wagui Anau; Australia	21.2 CR	John Lum Kon; Fiji	21.4	Jeffrey Bai; Papua New Guinea	21.6
400 metres	Waisea Finau; Fiji	48.3 CR	Jeffrey Bai; Papua New Guinea	48.5	Meli Cama; Fiji	49.6
800 metres	Russell Hasu; Papua New Guinea	1:58.5 CR	Jerry Iopam; Vanuatu	1:59.2	Linton Mani; Solomon Islands	1:59.2
1500 metres	Sapolai Yao; Papua New Guinea	4:04.8 CR	Jerry Iopam; Vanuatu	4:07.6	Medley Laban; Papua New Guinea	4:08.6
5000 metres	Chris Votu; Solomon Islands	15:33.8 CR, NR	David Kanie; Papua New Guinea	15:40.8	Sapolai Yao; Papua New Guinea	15:49.2
10000 metres	David Kanie; Papua New Guinea	32:28.7 CR	Chris Votu; Solomon Islands	32:44.0 NR	Jimmy Sandy Sam; Vanuatu	34:25.5
3000 metres steeplechase	Medley Laban; Papua New Guinea	9:52.2 CR	Henry Foufaka; Solomon Islands	9:52.4	David Reuben; Papua New Guinea	10:29.3
110 metres hurdles	Ivan Wakit; Papua New Guinea	16.0	Ivan Mala; Papua New Guinea	19.5		
400 metres hurdles	Meli Cama; Fiji	53.8 CR	Ivan Wakit; Papua New Guinea	54.1	Nathan Kabilu; Papua New Guinea	57.4
High jump	Sandy Katusele; Papua New Guinea	1.95m	Jack Iroga; Solomon Islands	1.75m		
Long jump	Eroni Tuivanuavou; Fiji	7.06m (wind: -1.5 m/s) CR	Sandy Katusele; Papua New Guinea	6.83m (wind: -2.5 m/s)	Hendricks Tari; Vanuatu	6.36m (wind: +0.4 m/s)
Triple jump	Sandy Katusele; Papua New Guinea	14.79m w (wind: +2.9 m/s)	Hendricks Tari; Vanuatu	12.72m (wind: 0.0 m/s)		
Shot put	Ezekiel Rangi; Solomon Islands	11.64m	Laramie Lewis; Papua New Guinea	10.46m	Paulus Mondo; Papua New Guinea	9.93m
Discus throw	Ezekiel Rangi; Solomon Islands	37.62m	Joe Aipe; Papua New Guinea	23.67m	Willie Komba; Papua New Guinea	20.08m
Javelin throw	Ezekiel Rangi; Solomon Islands	53.90	Michael Johnsly; Papua New Guinea	44.43	Paulus Mondo; Papua New Guinea	37.77
4 x 100 metres relay	Papua New Guinea; Jeffrey Bai; Wally Kirika; Henry Ben; Peter Pulu	41.4 CR	Fiji; Eronu Tuivanuavou; John Lum Kon; Meli Cama; Waisea Finau	41.8	Solomon Islands; Nelson Kabitana; Francis Manioru; Wilfred Lore; Jack Iroga	42.6
4 x 400 metres relay	Papua New Guinea; Jeffrey Bai; Ivan Wakit; Peter Pulu; Mowen Boino	3:20.4 CR	Solomon Islands; Chris Wailasi; Fred Thegu; Linton Mani; Nelson Kabitana	3:23.9	Vanuatu; David Benjimen; Jansen Molisingi; Peter-Paul Enkae; Moses Kamut	3:26.3

=== Women ===
Event	Gold		Silver		Bronze	
100 metres (wind: -2.0 m/s)	Litiana Miller; Fiji	11.8 CR	Mae Koime; Papua New Guinea	12.0	Nessie Ogisi; Papua New Guinea	12.3
200 metres (wind: -0.5 m/s)	Mereoni Raluve; Fiji	24.6 CR	Mae Koime; Papua New Guinea	25.2	Litiana Miller; Fiji	25.3
400 metres	Mereoni Raluve; Fiji	55.2 CR	Mae Koime; Papua New Guinea	58.1	Miriam Goiye; Papua New Guinea	60.7
800 metres	Miriam Goiye; Papua New Guinea	2:28.3	Merolyn Auga; Papua New Guinea	2:30.4		
1500 metres	Miriam Goiye; Papua New Guinea	5:16.9 CR	Jenny Gispe; Papua New Guinea	5:51.4		
5000 metres	Jenny Gispe; Papua New Guinea	22:17.3				
400 metres hurdles	Mae Koime; Papua New Guinea	65.8	Ledua Baker; Fiji	68.0	Banato Ibowa; Papua New Guinea	72.4
Long jump	Soko Salaqiqi; Fiji	5.17m CR				
Triple jump	Soko Salaqiqi; Fiji	11.25m				
Discus throw	Anna Mondo; Papua New Guinea	21.42m	Miranda Kuman; Papua New Guinea	18.47m	Mana Sugoro; Papua New Guinea	16.60m
Javelin throw	Anna Mondo; Papua New Guinea	28.83m				
4 x 100 metres relay	Fiji; Soko Salaqiqi; Litiana Miller; Ledua Baker; Mereoni Raluve	47.9 CR	Papua New Guinea; Lae Team	55.9		
4 x 400 metres relay	Papua New Guinea; Miriam Goiye; Tinaford Sahembo; Sharon Henry; Way	4:19.2				

== Medal table (unofficial) ==
* Host nation (Papua New Guinea)

Rank	Nation	Gold	Silver	Bronze	Total
1	Papua New Guinea*	16	15	13	44
2	Fiji	9	4	2	15
3	Solomon Islands	4	4	2	10
4	Australia	2	0	0	2
5	Vanuatu	0	3	3	6
Totals (5 entries)		31	26	20	77
