= Shameer Mon =

Indian sprinter

Personal information
- Nationality: Indian
- Born: Shameer Mon Naseema Manzile; 20 October 1983 (age 42)

Sport
- Country: India
- Sport: Athletics
Medal record
Men's Athletics
Commonwealth Games
Bronze medal – third place	2010 Delhi	4 x 100m relay

Shameer Mon Naseema Manzile (born 20 October 1983) is an Indian former athlete. He comes from Kerala.

Shameer won a bronze medal as a member of India's 4 x 100 metres relay team at the 2010 Commonwealth Games, which set a national record in the final.

At the 2010 Asian Games he was fourth in the 4 × 100 metres relay final, in which he was the team's third runner. The result was annulled when it was revealed that teammate Suresh Sathya had tested positive for nandrolone prior to the games.
