= Mateaki =

Mateaki is a given name. Notable people with the given name include:

- Mateaki Kafatolu (born 1989), New Zealand rugby union player
- Mateaki Mafi (born 1972), Tongan rugby player
