= Joseph Onika =

Solomon Islands politician (born 1967)

The Right Honourable Joseph Onika MP

Minister for Lands, Housing and Survey
- Incumbent
- Assumed office 18 April 2011
- Prime Minister: Danny Philip (until 16 November 2011); then Gordon Darcy Lilo
- Preceded by: Martin Sopage

Minister for Women, Youth & Children’s Affairs
- In office 27 August 2010 – 18 April 2011
- Prime Minister: Danny Philip
- Succeeded by: Dickson Mua

Member of Parliament for East Central Guadalcanal
- Incumbent
- Assumed office 4 August 2010
- Preceded by: Nollen Cornelius Leni

Personal details
- Born: May 2, 1967 (age 58) Komunima’aga, Guadalcanal Province
- Party: Independent

Joseph Onika
Medal record

Men's athletics

Representing Solomon Islands

Oceania Championships
Gold medal – first place	1990 Suva	100 m
Silver medal – second place	1990 Suva	200 m

Joseph Onika (born May 2, 1967, in Komunima’aga Village, Longgu District, Guadalcanal Province) is a Solomon Islands politician.

== Career ==
He worked in catering before going into politics. His career in national politics began when he was elected to Parliament as the member for East Central Guadalcanal in the August 2010 general election, standing as an independent candidate. He was then appointed Minister for Women, Youth and Children's Affairs in Prime Minister Danny Philip's Cabinet.

In April 2011, he was reshuffled to Minister for Lands, Housing and Survey. When Gordon Darcy Lilo replaced Philip as Prime Minister in November 2011, Onika retained his position in government.

== Achievements ==
Outside of politics, he also had a successful career competing in athletics.

Year	Competition	Venue	Position	Event	Notes
Representing Solomon Islands
1990	Oceania Championships	Suva, Fiji	1st	100 m	10.75 s
1990	Oceania Championships	Suva, Fiji	2nd	200 m	21.87 s
