= Alfred Rimah =

Solomon Islands politician

Member of the National Parliament of the Solomon Islands
- Incumbent
- Assumed office 17 April 2024
- Constituency: East Central Guadalcanal

Personal details
- Party: Solomon Islands Democratic Party

Lazarus Alfred Rimah or Rina is a Solomon Islands politician from the Solomon Islands Democratic Party. He was deputy governor of Guadalcanal Province.

In the 2024 Solomon Islands general election, he was elected to the National Parliament of the Solomon Islands in East Central Guadalcanal constituency.
