= Martin Sopage =

Solomon Islands politician (born 1966)

The Right Honourable Martin Sopage MP

Minister for Lands, Housing and Survey
- In office 17 February 2011 – 18 April 2011
- Prime Minister: Danny Philip
- Preceded by: himself, prior to vacancy
- Succeeded by: Joseph Onika

Minister for Lands, Housing and Survey
- In office 31 January 2011 – 8 February 2011
- Prime Minister: Danny Philip
- Preceded by: himself, prior to vacancy
- Succeeded by: himself, after vacancy

Minister for Lands, Housing and Survey
- In office 27 August 2010 – 20 January 2011
- Prime Minister: Danny Philip
- Succeeded by: himself, after vacancy

Minister for Infrastructure and Development
- In office 12 November 2007 – 20 December 2007
- Prime Minister: Manasseh Sogavare
- Preceded by: Stanley Sofu
- Succeeded by: Stanley Sofu

Member of Parliament for North Guadalcanal
- Incumbent
- Assumed office 5 April 2006
- Preceded by: Edmond Rukale

Personal details
- Born: May 1966 (age 59) Komuvaolu Village, Guadalcanal Province
- Party: Independent

Martin Sopage, whose name is also commonly spelt Martin Sopaghe, (born May 1966 in Komuvaolu Village, Guadalcanal Province) is a Solomon Islands politician.

After a primary school education, he went into private business. His career in national politics began when he was elected to the National Parliament as MP for the North Guadalcanal constituency in the general election on April 5, 2006. He was elected as an Independent. In November 2007, several ministers defected from Prime Minister Manasseh Sogavare's government in an attempt to bring down the government, and Sogavare appointed Sopage as Minister for Infrastructure and Development on November 12. Nevertheless, Sogavare was ousted in a motion of no confidence on December 20, ending Sopage's brief participation in Cabinet. Sopage retained his seat in the general election on August 4, 2010, having stood again as an Independent, unaffiliated to any political party. He was appointed Minister for Lands, Housing and Survey in Prime Minister Danny Philip's coalition Cabinet.

On January 20, 2011, he and three other ministers left the government and joined Steve Abana's official Opposition, citing dissatisfaction with the Cabinet being "manipulated by one or two people". On January 31, he returned to the government and resumed his Cabinet post. On February 8, he defected anew to the Opposition, then re-defected to the government with several other defectors on February 17, and resumed his post as Minister for Lands, Housing and Survey.

On April 18, Philip removed him from Cabinet in a reshuffle to make way for five Opposition members who had just joined the government ranks. Sopage was succeeded by Joseph Onika.

In early November, Sopage, along with several other former ministers who had lost their positions in that reshuffle, switched over to the Opposition again, and this time succeeded in bringing down the Philip government.

== Summary of membership during the Ninth Parliament (2010- ) ==
As of November 2011, Sopage has crossed the floor between the government and the opposition five times:

- Aug. 2010-Jan. 2011: government (frontbencher)
- Jan. 2011: opposition (for eleven days)
- Jan. 2011-Feb. 2011: government (frontbencher)
- Feb. 2011: opposition (for eleven days)
- Feb. 2011-Nov. 2011: government (frontbencher until April, then backbencher)
- Nov. 2011: opposition (helps bring down the government)
