= East Central Guadalcanal constituency =

East Central Guadalcanal
- Single-member constituency for the National Parliament of the Solomon Islands
- Region: Guadalcanal Province

Current constituency
- Created: 1993
- Current MP: Alfred Rimah
- Party: Solomon Islands Democratic Party

East Central Guadalcanal is a single-member constituency of the National Parliament of Solomon Islands. Located on the island of Guadalcanal, it was established in 1993 when Parliament was expanded from 38 to 47 seats; Its first MP, Hilda Kari, had served as the MP for North East Guadalcanal between 1989 and 1993.

== List of MPs ==
Term	MP	Party
1993–1997	Hilda Kari	
1997–2001	Hilda Kari	
2001–2006	Nollen Cornelius Leni	
2006–2010	Nollen Cornelius Leni	
2010–2014	Joseph Onika	Ownership, Unity and Responsibility Party
2014–2024	Ishmael Mali Avui	United Democratic Party
2024–	Alfred Rimah	Solomon Islands Democratic Party

== Election results ==
=== 2014 ===
Candidate	Party	Votes	%
Ishmael Mali Avui	United Democratic Party	1,746	31.35
Joseph Onika	Independent	1,357	24.37
Joseph Tapalia	Independent	643	11.55
Reuben Tovutovu	People's Alliance Party	526	9.45
Tony Joseph Koraua	Independent	464	8.33
Nollen Cornelius Leni	People First Party	437	7.85
Molia Gemali	Independent	244	4.38
Daniel Ogu Besa'a Kerevale	Independent	140	2.51
Gregory Ezra Awa	Independent	12	0.22
Total		5,569	100.00
Valid votes		5,569	99.54
Invalid/blank votes		26	0.46
Total votes		5,595	100.00
Source: Election Passport

=== 2010 ===
Candidate	Party	Votes	%
Joseph Onika	Ownership, Unity and Responsibility Party	1,133	25.32
Nollen Cornelius Leni		961	21.48
Gordon Tapalia		630	14.08
Reuben Tovutovu		606	13.54
Molia Gemali		392	8.76
Abel Arambola		330	7.38
Mark Gatu		155	3.46
Eric Thogole		108	2.41
Nathaniel Mara		75	1.68
Job Maneka Geseni		44	0.98
Kamilo Kevin Gaoma		40	0.89
Total		4,474	100.00
Valid votes		4,474	97.86
Invalid/blank votes		98	2.14
Total votes		4,572	100.00
Registered voters/turnout		7,458	61.30
Source: Election Passport

=== 2006 ===
Candidate	Votes	%
Nollen Cornelius Leni	984	23.17
Gordon Tapalia	799	18.82
Hilda Kari	655	15.43
John Gela	577	13.59
Benjamin Savino	377	8.88
Nathaniel Mara	294	6.92
Jamie Lency Vokia	269	6.34
John Selwyn Besa'a	261	6.15
Johnson Meshach Villia	30	0.71
Total	4,246	100.00
Registered voters/turnout	5,896	–
Source: Election Passport

=== 2001 ===
Candidate	Votes	%
Nollen Cornelius Leni	913	26.16
Hilda Kari	800	22.92
Mark Gatu	670	19.20
John Gela	464	13.30
Daniel S. Sande	456	13.07
Johnson Kengalu	187	5.36
Total	3,490	100.00
Registered voters/turnout	4,866	–
Source: Election Passport

=== 1997 ===
Candidate	Votes	%
Hilda Kari	1,626	49.66
Mark Gatu	794	24.25
Sam Mali	613	18.72
Nathaniel Mara	241	7.36
Total	3,274	100.00
Registered voters/turnout	4,419	–
Source: Election Passport

=== 1993 ===
Candidate	Votes	%
Hilda Kari	1,317	49.96
Hosley N. Tangikoba	559	21.21
Sam Mali	297	11.27
Gordon Tapalia	259	9.83
Alysios Tavoria	204	7.74
Total	2,636	100.00
Registered voters/turnout	3,443	–
Source: Election Passport
