= Athletics at the 1989 South Pacific Mini Games =

Athletics at the III South Pacific Mini Games
- Dates: August 24–30
- Host city: Nukuʻalofa, Tonga
- Venue: Teufaiva Stadium
- Level: Senior
- Events: 40 (23 men, 17 women)

Athletics competitions at the 1989 South Pacific Mini Games were held at the Teufaiva Stadium in Nukuʻalofa, Tonga, between August 24–30, 1989.

A total of 40 events were contested, 23 by men and 17 by women.

== Medal summary ==
Medal winners and their results were published on the Athletics Weekly webpage courtesy of Tony Isaacs and Børre Lilloe, and on the Oceania Athletics Association webpage by Bob Snow.

Complete results can also be found on the Oceania Athletics Association, and on the Athletics PNG webpages.

=== Men ===
Event	Gold		Silver		Bronze	
100 metres (wind: -1.5 m/s)	Emmanuel Mack (PNG)	11.16	Peauope Suli (TGA)	11.22	John Hou (PNG)	11.23
200 metres (wind: -1.8 m/s)	(French Polynesia) /Robert Tupuhoé (PYF)	21.60	Emmanuel Mack (PNG)	21.91	Ezekiel Wartovo (PNG)	22.36
400 metres	Joseph Mankon (VAN)	48.91	John Hou (PNG)	49.22	Braeman Yee (FIJ)	49.33
800 metres	(French Polynesia) /Vetea Escande (PYF)	1:53.64	Lui Muavesi (FIJ)	1:54.27	Dharmendran Nair (FIJ)	1:54.74
1500 metres	Moses Khan (FIJ)	4:09.93	Davendra Singh (FIJ)	4:09.94	Dharmendran Nair (FIJ)	4:10.42
5000 metres	Alain Lazare (NCL)	14:45.27	Aaron Dupnai (PNG)	15:46.92	Moses Khan (FIJ)	15:49.92
10000 metres	Alain Lazare (NCL)	30:30.96	Aaron Dupnai (PNG)	32:41.70	Shiri Chand (FIJ)	33:26.5
Marathon	Shiri Chand (FIJ)	2:36:52	Philip Aitai (SOL)	2:40:58	Ken Mova (PNG)	2:42:08
3000 metres steeplechase	Alain Lazare (NCL)	9:41.84	Davendra Singh (FIJ)	9:45.39	Ken Mova (PNG)	9:51.01
110 metres hurdles (wind:NWI)	(French Polynesia) /Robert Tupuhoé (PYF)	14.99	Homelo Vi (TGA)	15.53	Franck Debien (NCL)	15.87
400 metres hurdles	(French Polynesia) /Robert Tupuhoé (PYF)	52.32	Albert Chambonnier (NCL)	54.49	Joe Rodan (FIJ)	54.87
High jump	Jean-Bernard Fuller (NCL)	2.00	Clément Poaniewa (NCL)	2.00	(French Polynesia) /Jean-Luc Mu Kwai Chuan (PYF)	1.94
Pole vault	(French Polynesia) /Thibaut Cattiau (PYF)	5.00	(French Polynesia) /Jean-Luc Mu Kwai Chuan (PYF)	4.50	Viliame Teumohenga (TGA)	4.15
Long jump	Ikani Taliai (TGA)	7.22 w (wind: +3.5 m/s)	Jean-Jacques Honda (NCL)	7.20 w (wind: +3.5 m/s)	Setiliki Mateialona (TGA)	7.10 (wind: +1.9 m/s)
Triple jump	Steeve Druminy (NCL)	15.65 w (wind: +2.3 m/s)	Jean Fantozzi (NCL)	14.95 w (wind: +3.1 m/s)	Clément Poaniewa (NCL)	14.47 w (wind: +2.6 m/s)
Shot put	Soane Suve (NCL)	15.55	(French Polynesia) /Gordon Barff (PYF)	14.99	Sanitesi Latu (TGA)	14.33
Discus throw	(French Polynesia) /Gordon Barff (PYF)	49.42	Martial Bone (NCL)	44.52	Topié Suve (NCL)	43.00
Hammer throw	Pierre-Chanel Sao (NCL)	56.26	Topié Suve (NCL)	53.48	Thierry Polutele (NCL)	52.60
Javelin throw	James Goulding (FIJ)	70.10	Jean-Claude Terebo (NCL)	69.02	(French Polynesia) /Joseph Levard (PYF)	63.26
Decathlon	Erich Momberger (PNG)	6202	Homelo Vi (TGA)	6172	Ferdinand Nongkas (PNG)	6088
20 Kilometres Road Walk	Moetu Tangitamaiti (COK)	2:34:39				
4 x 100 metres relay	Papua New Guinea; Emmanuel Mack; Ferdinard Nongkas; Ezekiel Wartovo; Dalos Umul	42.26	Tonga	42.79	New Caledonia	42.85
4 x 400 metres relay	Papua New Guinea; Fosa Torea; Ngazila Kasi; John Hou; Emmanuel Mack	3:17.44	Fiji	3:17.77	Vanuatu	3:21.97

=== Women ===
Event	Gold		Silver		Bronze	
100 metres (wind: -3.0 m/s)	Iammo Launa (PNG)	12.76	Sandra Aho (TGA)	12.90	Vaciseva Tavaga (FIJ)	12.93
200 metres (wind: -2.1 m/s)	Iammo Launa (PNG)	25.45	Vaciseva Tavaga (FIJ)	25.82	Erin Tierney (COK)	25.91
400 metres	(French Polynesia) /Katia Sanford (PYF)	57.54	Sereana Rayasi (FIJ)	58.58	Malia Makisi (TGA)	59.45
800 metres	Kim Petersen (SAM)	2:24.42	Rosemary Nami (PNG)	2:24.99	Vasa Tulahe (TGA)	2:25.10
1500 metres	Nadia Bernard (NCL)	4:52.45	(French Polynesia) /Teroro Meyer (PYF)	5:01.15	Andrea Rose Garae (VAN)	5:04.85
3000 metres	Nadia Bernard (NCL)	10:27.46	(French Polynesia) /Teroro Meyer (PYF)	11:07.41	Rosemary Nami (PNG)	11:10.19
10000 metres	Nadia Bernard (NCL)	39:48.42	(French Polynesia) /Teroro Meyer (PYF)	43:07.15		
100 metres hurdles (wind:NWI)	(French Polynesia) /Véronique Boyer (PYF)	15.06	(French Polynesia) /Gaëlle Arbus de la Palme (PYF)	15.28	Sainiana Tukana (FIJ)	15.60
400 metres hurdles	(French Polynesia) /Katia Sanford (PYF)	59.96	Kim Petersen (SAM)	63.91	Sainiana Tukana (FIJ)	67.47
High jump	Dionne Gardner (NFK)	1.70	(French Polynesia) /Albertine An (PYF)	1.65	(French Polynesia) /Véronique Boyer (PYF)	1.65
Long jump	Lily Tua (PNG)	5.66 w (wind: +3.5 m/s)	(French Polynesia) /Véronique Boyer (PYF)	5.33 w (wind: +2.4 m/s)	Corinne Martin (NCL)	5.17 w (wind: +3.0 m/s)
Shot put	Marie-Christine Fakaté (NCL)	14.31	Siololovau Ikavuka (TGA)	13.82	Marie-Danielle Teanyouen (NCL)	12.72
Discus throw	Marie-Christine Fakaté (NCL)	50.96	Siololovau Ikavuka (TGA)	49.54	(French Polynesia) /Sandra Pito (Bordes) (PYF)	40.38
Javelin throw	Marie-Danielle Teanyouen (NCL)	45.20	Rosemai Poilagi (NCL)	45.08	Pielina Fakaté (NCL)	43.38
Heptathlon	Iammo Launa (PNG)	5038	Sainiana Tukana (FIJ)	4518	(French Polynesia) /Véronique Boyer (PYF)	4515
4 x 100 metres relay	/French Polynesia; Gaëlle Arbus de la Palme; Aimata Leroy; Véronique Boyer; Katia Sanford	49.01	Papua New Guinea; Iammo Launa; Yal Jonathon; Lily Tua; Raka Alu	49.07	Tonga	50.48
4 x 400 metres relay	Fiji	3:55.59	Tonga	3:59.75	/French Polynesia; Aimata Leroy; Marie-Jeanne Ceran-Jerusalemy; Véronique Boyer; Katia Sanford	4:07.18

== Medal table (unofficial) ==
* Host nation (Tonga)

Rank	Nation	Gold	Silver	Bronze	Total
1	New Caledonia (NCL)	13	8	8	29
2	French Polynesia (PYF)	10	8	6	24
3	Papua New Guinea (PNG)	8	6	6	20
4	Fiji (FIJ)	4	7	9	20
5	Tonga (TON)*	1	8	6	15
6	Western Samoa (WSM)	1	1	0	2
7	Vanuatu (VAN)	1	0	2	3
8	Cook Islands (COK)	1	0	1	2
9	Norfolk Island (NFK)	1	0	0	1
10	Solomon Islands (SOL)	0	1	0	1
Totals (10 entries)		40	39	38	117

== Participation (unofficial) ==
Athletes from the following 13 countries were reported to participate:

- American Samoa
- Cook Islands
- Fiji
- /French Polynesia
- Guam
- Nauru
- New Caledonia
- Norfolk Island
- Papua New Guinea
- Solomon Islands
- Tonga
- Vanuatu
- Western Samoa
