= Vulelua =

Island in Solomon Islands

Coordinates: 9°29′50″S 160°28′38″E

Vulelua (also Neal Island) is an island in Solomon Islands; it is located in Guadalcanal Province. There is a hotel in the island.
