= Nughu =

Island in Solomon Islands

Coordinates: 9°17′04″S 160°20′35″E

Nughu is an island in the Solomon Islands; it is located in Guadalcanal Province. The estimated terrain elevation above sea level is some 12 metres.
