= Rahamatulla Molla =

Indian sprinter

Personal information
- Nationality: Indian
- Born: Rahamatulla Molla; 30 March 1987 (age 39)

Sport
- Country: India
- Sport: Athletics
Medal record
Men's Athletics
Commonwealth Games
Bronze medal – third place	2010 Delhi	4 x 100m relay

Rahamatulla Molla (born 30 March 1987) is an Indian former athlete.

He won a bronze medal as a member of India's 4 x 100 metres relay team at the 2010 Commonwealth Games, which set a national record in the final.

At the 2010 Asian Games he was fourth in the 4 × 100 metres relay, but the result was annulled when it was revealed that teammate Suresh Sathya had tested positive for nandrolone prior to the games.

== Personal life ==
Rahamatulla, the son of a carpenter, is one of six siblings from a Muslim family in West Bengal. He lives in Daqaitmara village which is 60 km away from Kolkata. He has got four brothers and one sister.

Rahamatulla was a police constable in Kolkata.
