= Korasahalu =

Island in Solomon Islands

Coordinates: 09°48′16″S 160°50′36″E

Korasahalu is an island in Guadalcanal Province, Solomon Islands.

== Geography ==
The highest point of the island is 65 meters. The island is located 3 km south of Cape Lauvi and 21 km west of Cape Henslow of Guadalcanal Island. To the north there are two more islets with a maximum height of 15 m. The island is separated from Guadalcanal by a deep strait. There is a lagoon within the island.

== Population ==
There is no permanent population there, but the island is often visited by fishermen from neighboring islands.
