= Shayna Powless =

American cyclist (born 1994)

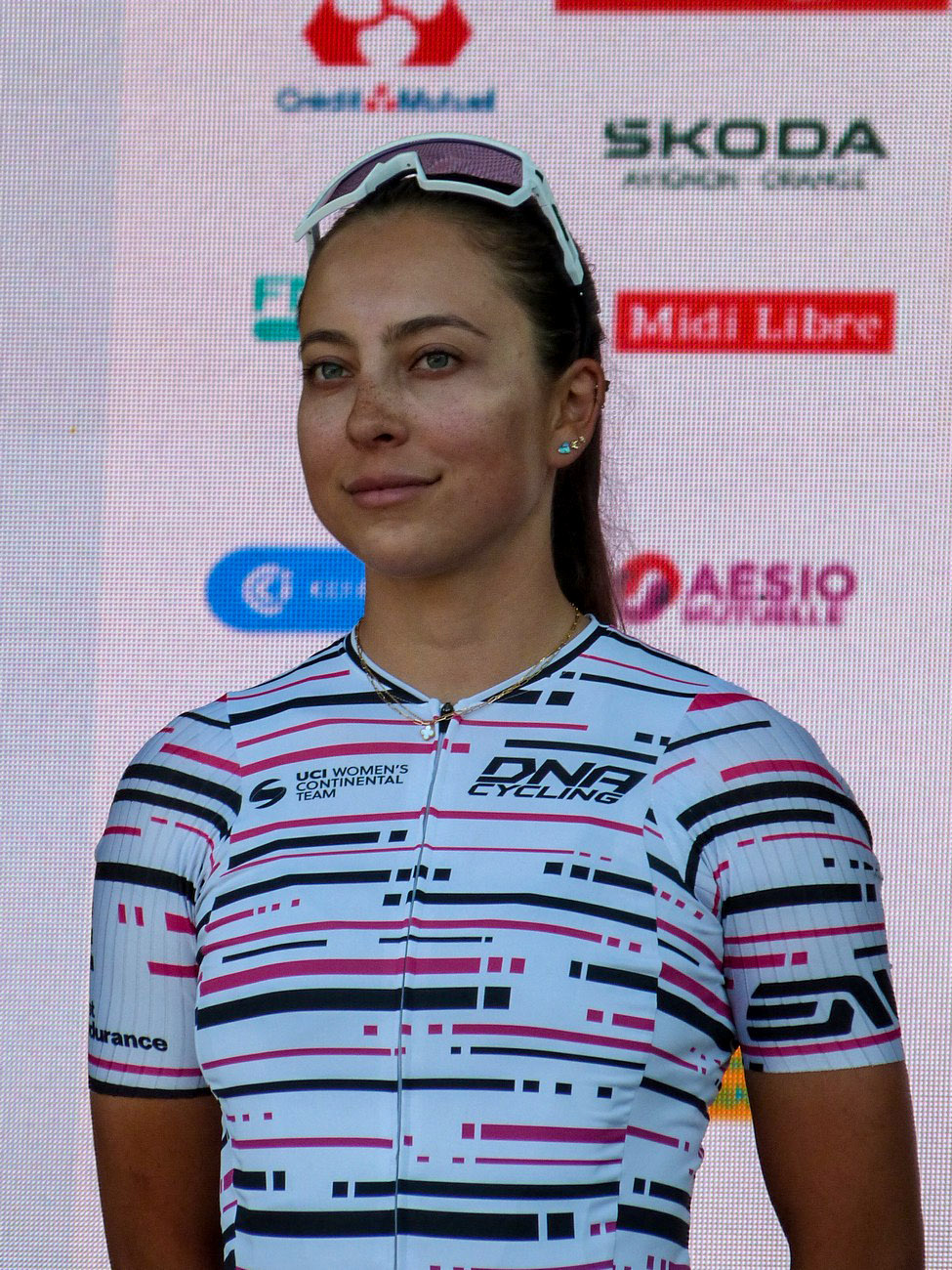

Personal information
- Born: January 8, 1994 (age 32) Eglin Air Force Base, Florida
- Height: 5 ft 8 in (173 cm)

Cycling career
- Sport: Cycling
- Disciplines: Mountain biking, road, gravel racing
- Role: Rider
- Rider type: All-rounder

Amateur teams
- 2012-2014: BMC MTB Development
- 2015-2016: Liv Co-Factory MTB

Professional teams
- 2017-2021: Sho-Air Twenty20
- 2022: L39ION of Los Angeles
- 2023-2024: DNA Pro Cycling

Shayna Powless (born January 8, 1994) is an American former professional racing cyclist. She is of Oneida heritage through her father and is a citizen of the Oneida Nation of Wisconsin.

She grew up in Sacramento, California and played a variety of sports whilst growing up, but initially gravitated towards mountain bike racing during her high school years. In 2013, Powless was crowned Under-23 US national mountain bike champion in her first season in that age category.

She took up road bicycle racing when she joined the cycling team at the University of California, Los Angeles. She signed to ride for the UCI Women's Team Virginia's Blue Ridge–Twenty28 for the 2019 women's road cycling season.

== Personal life ==
She is the daughter of Olympic marathon runner Jen Allred and the sister of fellow racing cyclist Neilson Powless.

She has been in a relationship with Canadian American football player Eli Ankou since 2013, after the couple met at UCLA. The couple got engaged in 2021, and married in 2025.

== Major results ==
2018
10th Overall Joe Martin Stage Race
2019
10th Winston Salem Cycling Classic
2022
4th Road race, National Road Championships
7th La Picto - Charentaise
2023
Tour of the Gila

1st Points classification
