= Athletics at the 2010 Commonwealth Games – Men's 4 × 100 metres relay =

Men's 4 × 100 metres relay at the Commonwealth Games

The Men's 4 × 100 metres relay at the 2010 Commonwealth Games as part of the athletics programme was held at the Jawaharlal Nehru Stadium on Monday 11 October and Tuesday 12 October 2010.

== Records ==
- The following records were in place before the competition

World record	37.10	Jamaica	Beijing, China	22 August 2008
Games record	38.20	England	Kuala Lumpur, Malaysia	1998

== Round 1 ==
First 2 in each heat (Q) and 2 best performers (q) advance to the Final.

=== Heat 1 ===
Lane	Nation	Competitors	Time	Notes
8	India	Rahamatulla Molla, Suresh Sathya, Shameer Naseema, Abdul Qureshi	39.00	Q, NR
2	Trinidad and Tobago	Shaun Stuart, Marcus Duncan, Emmanuel Callender, Aaron Armstrong	39.47	Q
3	Ghana	Nathan Kpegbah, Allah Laryea-Akrong, Emmanuel Appiah, Aziz Zakari	39.81	
6	Mauritius	Ahmed Ondimba, Jean Milazar, Louis Coiffic, Jean Brasse	40.21	
7	Turks and Caicos Islands	Roshand Cox, Reonardo Harvey, Delano Williams, Darian Forbes	41.99	NR
5	Vanuatu	Moses Kamut, David Benjimin, Arnold Sorina, Emile Nissap	43.52	
4	Nigeria	Peter Emelezie, Stanley Gbagbeke, Benjamin Adukwu, Egwero Oghoghene		DSQ

=== Heat 2 ===
Lane	Nation	Competitors	Time	Notes
4	Bahamas	Jamial Rolle, Adrian Griffith, Brunell McKenzie, Rodney Green	39.33	Q
7	Australia	Patrick Johnson, Matt Davies, Aaron Rouge-Serret, Isaac Ntiamoah	39.53	Q
5	Singapore	Foo Yeo, Muhammad Bib, Muhammad Jamal, Li Kang	40.14	
6	Niue	Xavier Niuia-Tofa, Suitulaga Tupuiliu, Ponifasio Tahamaka, Billie Wallbridge-Paea	44.85	
8	The Gambia	Lamin Camara, Abdoulie Assim, Ousman Gibba, Suwaibou Sanneh		DNF
3	Cayman Islands	Carl Morgan, Carlos Morgan, David Hamil, Ronald Forbes		DSQ

=== Heat 3 ===
Lane	Nation	Competitors	Time	Notes
6	Canada	Hank Palmer, Oluseyi Smith, Jared Connaughton, Sam Effah	38.45	Q
2	England	Ryan Scott, Leon Baptiste, Marlon Devonish, Mark Lewis-Francis	38.67	Q
3	Jamaica	Lerone Clarke, Remaldo Rose, Steve Slowly, Rasheed Dwyer	39.00	q
4	Kenya	Simon Kimaru, Anderson Mutegi, Stephen Barasa, Kipkemoi Soy	39.60	q
7	Solomon Islands	Adison Alfred, Francis Manioru, Chris Walasi, Jack Iroga	44.04	
5	Sierra Leone	Bockarie Sesay, Thomas Vandy, Ibrahim Turay, Musa Sandy	44.11	

== Final ==
Rank	Lane	Nation	Competitors	Time	Notes
1st place, gold medalist(s)	5	England	Ryan Scott, Leon Baptiste, Marlon Devonish, Mark Lewis-Francis	38.74	
2nd place, silver medalist(s)	3	Jamaica	Lerone Clarke, Lansford Spence, Rasheed Dwyer, Remaldo Rose	38.79	
3rd place, bronze medalist(s)	6	India	Rahamatulla Molla, Suresh Sathya, Shameer Naseema, Abdul Qureshi	38.89	
4	9	Australia	Aaron Rouge-Serret, Isaac Ntiamoah, Jacob Groth, Matt Davies	39.14	
5	7	Bahamas	Jamial Rolle, Adrian Griffith, Brunell McKenzie, Rodney Green	39.27	
–	2	Kenya	Simon Kimaru, Stephen Okatch, Stephen Barasa, Kipkemoi Soy		DNF
–	8	Trinidad and Tobago	Shaun Stuart, Emmanuel Callender, Marcus Duncan, Aaron Armstrong		DNF
–	4	Canada	Hank Palmer, Oluseyi Smith, Jared Connaughton, Sam Effah		DSQ
