= Abdul Najeeb Qureshi =

Indian sprinter

Abdul Najeeb
Personal information
- Full name: Mohammed Abdul Najeeb Qureshi
- Nationality: India
- Born: 25 February 1988 (age 38) Hyderabad, Telangana, India
- Spouse: Mohammad Alvia Sanaila

Sport
- Country: India
- Sport: Track and field
- Events: 100 metres, 200 metres

Achievements and titles
- Personal bests: 60 m: 6.90 (Tehran 2010); 100 m: 10.30 (New Delhi 2010); 200 m: 21.06 (Kochi 2010)
Medal record
Commonwealth Games
Bronze medal – third place	2010 Delhi	4 × 100 m relay

Abdul Najeeb Qureshi (born 25 February 1988) is an Indian sprinter from Hyderabad. Najeeb, along with Anil Kumar Prakash, jointly held the 100 metres Indian national record of 10.30, before it was broken by Amiya Kumar Mallick.

On 6 October 2010, Qureshi equalled the national 100 m record while qualifying for the semi-finals during the 2010 Commonwealth Games held at New Delhi, India. He clocked 10.30 s to equal Anil Kumar Prakash's national record set in 2005 at the National Circuit Athletic Meet held in New Delhi. Qureshi was also part of India's 4x100 relay team that won the bronze medal at the 2010 Commonwealth Games. The team set a new national record of 38.89s.

Qureshi also won 200 m sprint at the South Asian Games held at Dhaka, Bangladesh in February 2010.

He completed his schooling from Defence Laboratories School, Kanchanbagh, Hyderabad. At school, his inherent talent in running was identified by his coach Adarsh Goswami. He encouraged Najeeb to participate in the CBSE meet.

During the Guangzhou Asian Games – 2010, he lost his bronze medal by just a hundredth of a second.
