= Takale Tuna =

Papua New Guinean sprinter

Takale Tuna OLY
Personal information
- Nationality: Papua New Guinean
- Born: 17 January 1965 (age 61) Rabaul, Papua New Guinea

Sport
- Sport: Sprinting
- Events: 200 metres, 400 metres
Medal record
Men's Athletics
Representing Papua New Guinea
Pacific Games
Gold medal – first place	1987 Nouméa	200m
Gold medal – first place	1987 Nouméa	400m
Gold medal – first place	1991 Port Moresby	200m
Gold medal – first place	1991 Port Moresby	4×100 m relay
Gold medal – first place	1991 Port Moresby	4×400 m relay
Silver medal – second place	1987 Nouméa	100m
Silver medal – second place	1987 Nouméa	4×400 m relay
Silver medal – second place	1991 Port Moresby	100m
Silver medal – second place	1991 Port Moresby	400m
Bronze medal – third place	1987 Nouméa	4×100m
- Updated on 24 August 2017

Takale Tuna (born 17 January 1965) is a Papua New Guinean sprinter. He competed in the men's 200 metres at the 1988 Summer Olympics.

Tuna has been described as "one of PNG's most successful ever athletes". His son Tovetina Tuna is also a sprinter.
