= Isaac Ntiamoah =

Australian sprinter (born 1982)

Personal information
- Born: 27 October 1982 (age 43) Canberra, Australian Capital Territory
- Height: 172 cm (5 ft 8 in)
- Weight: 75 kg (165 lb)

Sport
- Country: Australia
- Sport: Athletics
- Event: 4 × 100m relay

Isaac Ntiamoah (born 27 October 1982) is an Australian track and field sprinter.

He was a member of the Australian 4 × 100 m relay team that equalled the Australian record when they qualified for the finals at the 2012 London Olympics. In the final the team finished sixth. Ntiamoah also took a fourth place in the relay at the 2010 Commonwealth Games, and competed in relay at the 2011 World Championships without reaching the final.
