= 2006 IAAF World Indoor Championships – Men's 60 metres =

The Men's 60 metres event at the 2006 IAAF World Indoor Championships was held on March 10.

== Medalists ==
| Gold | Silver | Bronze |
|---|---|---|
| Leonard Scott; United States | Andrey Epishin; Russia | Terrence Trammell; United States |

== Results ==
=== Heats ===
First 3 of each heat (Q) and next 3 fastest (q) qualified for the semifinals.

| Rank | Heat | Name | Nationality | Time | Notes |
|---|---|---|---|---|---|
| 1 | 6 | Terrence Trammell | United States | 6.60 | Q |
| 2 | 3 | Olusoji Fasuba | Nigeria | 6.61 | Q |
| 3 | 1 | Anatoliy Dovhal | Ukraine | 6.63 | Q, SB |
| 3 | 5 | Andrey Epishin | Russia | 6.63 | Q |
| 5 | 2 | Kostyantyn Vasyukov | Ukraine | 6.66 | Q |
| 6 | 2 | Leonard Scott | United States | 6.67 | Q |
| 6 | 4 | Ronald Pognon | France | 6.67 | Q |
| 6 | 5 | Matic Osovnikar | Slovenia | 6.67 | Q |
| 9 | 2 | Henry Vizcaíno | Cuba | 6.69 | Q, PB |
| 10 | 2 | Kael Becerra | Chile | 6.70 | q, NR |
| 10 | 3 | Oudéré Kankarafou | France | 6.70 | Q, PB |
| 10 | 6 | Francesco Scuderi | Italy | 6.70 | Q |
| 10 | 6 | Nghi Tran | Finland | 6.70 | Q |
| 10 | 6 | Dariusz Kuć | Poland | 6.70 | q |
| 10 | 6 | Marko Bratož | Slovenia | 6.70 | q |
| 16 | 1 | Lerone Clarke | Jamaica | 6.71 | Q |
| 16 | 2 | Eric Nkansah | Ghana | 6.71 | |
| 16 | 4 | Martin Lachkovics | Austria | 6.71 | Q |
| 19 | 1 | Vicente de Lima | Brazil | 6.73 | Q |
| 19 | 7 | Gábor Dobos | Hungary | 6.73 | Q |
| 19 | 7 | Wen Yongyi | China | 6.73 | Q |
| 22 | 4 | Mark Findlay | Great Britain | 6.74 | Q |
| 22 | 5 | Eric Pacome N'Dri | Ivory Coast | 6.74 | Q |
| 24 | 1 | Daniel Persson | Sweden | 6.75 | |
| 25 | 4 | Daniel Abenzoar-Foulé | Luxembourg | 6.76 | NR |
| 26 | 4 | Andreas Baumann | Switzerland | 6.77 | |
| 26 | 7 | Iván Mocholí | Spain | 6.77 | Q |
| 28 | 4 | Niconnor Alexander | Trinidad and Tobago | 6.78 | SB |
| 28 | 7 | Deji Aliu | Nigeria | 6.78 | |
| 30 | 1 | Aleksandr Volkov | Russia | 6.79 | |
| 30 | 7 | Prodromos Katsantonis | Cyprus | 6.79 | |
| 32 | 6 | Rolando Palacios | Honduras | 6.80 | NR |
| 32 | 7 | Vyacheslav Muravyev | Kazakhstan | 6.80 | |
| 34 | 3 | Tim Abeyie | Great Britain | 6.81 | Q |
| 35 | 6 | Casnel Bushay | Saint Vincent and the Grenadines | 6.84 | PB |
| 36 | 3 | Maksim Lynsha | Belarus | 6.85 | |
| 37 | 3 | Wachara Sondee | Thailand | 6.88 | |
| 37 | 5 | Raphael de Oliveira | Brazil | 6.88 | |
| 39 | 2 | Tang Yik Chun | Hong Kong | 6.89 | |
| 40 | 5 | Ricardo Williams | Jamaica | 6.91 | |
| 41 | 3 | Liang Tse-Ching | Chinese Taipei | 6.93 | PB |
| 42 | 1 | Vahagn Javakhyan | Armenia | 7.03 | |
| 42 | 5 | Mohamad Tamim | Lebanon | 7.03 | |
| 44 | 7 | Khalil Al-Hanahneh | Jordan | 7.06 | |
| 45 | 5 | Francis Manioru | Solomon Islands | 7.07 | NR |
| 46 | 3 | I Made Budiasa | Indonesia | 7.08 | PB |
| 47 | 3 | Fawy Rawi Erzalmaniq | Singapore | 7.09 | |
| 48 | 4 | Tyrone Omar | Northern Mariana Islands | 7.17 | NR |
| 49 | 7 | Mervin Loizeau | Seychelles | 7.22 | PB |
| 50 | 6 | Pierre de Windt | Aruba | 7.26 | PB |
| 51 | 1 | Ronald Parker | Turks and Caicos Islands | 7.28 | PB |
| 52 | 5 | Ali Shareef | Maldives | 7.33 | NR |
| 53 | 1 | Chaleunsouk Ao Udomphanh | Laos | 7.34 | PB |
| 53 | 4 | Rikko Thoma | Nauru | 7.34 | PB |
| | 2 | Souhalia Alamou | Benin | DNS | |

=== Semifinals ===
First 2 of each semifinal (Q) and next 2 fastest (q) qualified for the final.

| Rank | Heat | Name | Nationality | Time | Notes |
|---|---|---|---|---|---|
| 1 | 3 | Leonard Scott | United States | 6.50 | Q, WL |
| 2 | 3 | Olusoji Fasuba | Nigeria | 6.55 | Q, SB |
| 3 | 2 | Terrence Trammell | United States | 6.58 | Q |
| 4 | 1 | Andrey Epishin | Russia | 6.59 | Q, SB |
| 5 | 3 | Vicente de Lima | Brazil | 6.60 | q, AR |
| 6 | 1 | Matic Osovnikar | Slovenia | 6.62 | Q, SB |
| 7 | 1 | Henry Vizcaíno | Cuba | 6.63 | q, PB |
| 7 | 2 | Ronald Pognon | France | 6.63 | Q |
| 7 | 3 | Kostyantyn Vasyukov | Ukraine | 6.63 | SB |
| 10 | 3 | Dariusz Kuć | Poland | 6.64 | PB |
| 11 | 2 | Lerone Clarke | Jamaica | 6.66 | PB |
| 12 | 3 | Francesco Scuderi | Italy | 6.69 | SB |
| 13 | 1 | Kael Becerra | Chile | 6.70 | =NR |
| 13 | 2 | Eric Pacome N'Dri | Ivory Coast | 6.70 | PB |
| 13 | 3 | Wen Yongyi | Ivory Coast | 6.70 | |
| 16 | 2 | Martin Lachkovics | Austria | 6.71 | |
| 17. | 2 | Mark Findlay | Great Britain | 6.72 | |
| 18 | 2 | Marko Bratož | Slovenia | 6.73 | |
| 19 | 1 | Anatoliy Dovhal | Ukraine | 6.75 | |
| 19 | 2 | Gábor Dobos | Hungary | 6.75 | |
| 19 | 3 | Iván Mocholí | Spain | 6.75 | |
| 22 | 1 | Oudéré Kankarafou | France | 6.78 | |
| 23 | 1 | Nghi Tran | Finland | 6.79 | |
| 24 | 1 | Tim Abeyie | Great Britain | 6.81 | |

=== Final ===
| Rank | Lane | Name | Nationality | Time | React | Notes |
|---|---|---|---|---|---|---|
| 1st place, gold medalist(s) | 4 | Leonard Scott | United States | 6.50 | 0.124 | =WL |
| 2nd place, silver medalist(s) | 3 | Andrey Epishin | Russia | 6.52 | 0.144 | NR |
| 3rd place, bronze medalist(s) | 5 | Terrence Trammell | United States | 6.54 | 0.171 | |
| 4 | 8 | Matic Osovnikar | Slovenia | 6.58 | 0.155 | =NR |
| 5 | 6 | Olusoji Fasuba | Nigeria | 6.58 | 0.163 | |
| 6 | 2 | Ronald Pognon | France | 6.61 | 0.135 | SB |
| 7 | 1 | Vicente de Lima | Brazil | 6.62 | 0.159 | |
| 8 | 7 | Henry Vizcaíno | Cuba | 6.84 | 0.153 | |
