= Isaac Yaya =

French Polynesian sprinter

Isaac Yaya (born 5 July 1979) is a French Polynesian former track and field athlete who competed in sprinting events.

He made his international debut at the 1998 World Junior Championships in Athletics, running in the heats of both the 200 metres and 400 metres competitions.

In December 2003 he set two indoor French Polynesian records in athletics jumping 12.14 m (39 ft 9 3/4 in) for the triple jump and running the 50 metres in 6.03 seconds. After setting an outdoor best and national record of 47.13 seconds for the 400 metres in Nice, France, he had his first outing on the global senior stage at the 2005 World Championships in Athletics, where he competed in the heats only. The following year he set national indoor records for the 400 m twice, with his best performance of 48.45 seconds coming in the heats at the 2006 IAAF World Indoor Championships.

In regional competition, he was fourth in the 400 m at the 2007 Pacific Games and also helped set a national record in the 4×400 metres relay. After a decline in performance in 2008, he ceased competing internationally.
