= Kaminiel Selot =

Papua New Guinean sprinter

Personal information
- Nationality: Papua New Guinean
- Born: 1 June 1970 (age 56)

Sport
- Sport: Sprinting
- Event: 200 metres

Kaminiel Selot (born 1 June 1970) is a Papua New Guinean sprinter. He competed in the men's 200 metres at the 1992 Summer Olympics.
