= Francis Manioru =

Personal information
- Nationality: Solomon Islands
- Born: September 17, 1981 (age 44)
- Height: 1.60 m (5 ft 3 in)
- Weight: 64 kg (141 lb)

Sport
- Sport: Athletics
Medal record
Men's athletics
Representing Solomon Islands
Pacific Games
Bronze medal – third place	2007 Apia	4x100 m relay
(South) Pacific Mini Games
Bronze medal – third place	2001 Middlegate	4x100 m relay
Oceania Championships
Bronze medal – third place	2004 Townsville	800 m medley relay
- Updated on 26 June 2019

Francis Manioru (born September 17, 1981) is a sprinter from Solomon Islands who specializes in the 100 metres.

He participated at the 2004 Olympic Games where he achieved 11.05 seconds in the heat. Four years later, at the 2008 Summer Olympics he finished in eighth and last position in his heat with a time of 11.09 seconds.

== Personal best ==
Event	Result	Venue	Date	Notes
Outdoor
100 m	10.99 s (wind: +0.7 m/s)	(India) New Delhi	6 October 2010	
100 m	10.96 s (wind: -0.4 m/s)	(Samoa) Apia	13 December 2006	not official
100 m	10.86 s (wind: +2.1 m/s)	(Australia) Townsville	16 December 2004	wind assisted
200 m	22.91 s (wind: +0.2 m/s)	(Australia) Cairns	25 September 2010	
200 m	22.32 s (wind: +3.0 m/s)	(Australia) Townsville	17 December 2004	wind assisted
Indoor
60 m	7.07 s	(Russia) Moscow	10 March 2006	National record

== Achievements ==
Year	Competition	Venue	Position	Event	Notes
Representing Solomon Islands
2001	South Pacific Mini Games	Middlegate, Norfolk Island	10th (sf)	100 m	11.34
2001	South Pacific Mini Games	Middlegate, Norfolk Island	3rd	4 × 100 m relay	42.41
2003	South Pacific Games	Suva, Fiji	13th (sf)	100 m	11.56
2003	South Pacific Games	Suva, Fiji	4th	4 × 100 m relay	42.38
2004	Olympic Games	Athens, Greece	69th (h)	100 m	11.05
2004	Oceania Championships	Townsville, Australia	5th	100 m	11.01
2004	Oceania Championships	Townsville, Australia	7th	200 m	22.61
2004	Oceania Championships	Townsville, Australia	3rd	800 m medley relay	1:35.48
2006	Indoor World Championships	Moscow, Russia	45th (h)	60 m	7.07 NR
2006	Commonwealth Games	Melbourne, Australia	46th (h)	100 m	11.12
2006	Oceania Championships	Apia, Samoa	5th	100 m	11.00
2006	Oceania Championships	Apia, Samoa	4th	4 × 100 m relay	42.33
2007	Pacific Games	Apia, Samoa	12th (sf)	100 m	11.11
2007	Pacific Games	Apia, Samoa	3rd	4 × 100 m relay	41.55 NR
2008	Indoor World Championships	Valencia, Spain	46th (h)	60 m	7.22
2008	Oceania Championships	Saipan, Northern Mariana Islands	6th	100 m	11.24
2008	Olympic Games	Beijing, China	67th (h)	100 m	11.09
2010	Oceania Championships	Cairns, Australia	9th (sf)	100 m	11.04
2010	Oceania Championships	Cairns, Australia	13th (h)	200 m	22.91
2010	Commonwealth Games	New Delhi, India	45th (h)	100 m	10.99
2010	Commonwealth Games	New Delhi, India	14th (h)	4 × 100 m relay	44.04
2011	World Championships	Daegu, South Korea	58th (pr)	100 m	11.28
2014	Commonwealth Games	Glasgow, Great Britain	72nd (h)	100 m	11.87
