= Nollen Cornelius Leni =

Solomon Islands politician

Nollen Cornelius Leni is a Solomon Islands politician. He was a member of the National Parliament of the Solomon Islands between 2001 and 2010, representing the East Central Guadalcanal constituency. He also served as Minister for Fisheries and Marine Resources. He was Minister of Foreign Affairs briefly in 2002.
