= Suresh Sathya =

Indian athlete

Personal information
- Nationality: Indian
- Born: Suresh Sathya; 7 September 1987 (age 39)

Sport
- Country: India
- Sport: Athletics
Medal record
Men's Athletics
Commonwealth Games
Bronze medal – third place	2010 Delhi	4 x 100m relay

Suresh Sathya (born 7 September 1987) is an Indian former athlete. The team consisting of Sathya currently holds the Indian national record in 4 × 100 metres relay.

Sathya won a bronze medal as a member of India's 4 x 100 metres relay team at the 2010 Commonwealth Games, which also set the national record in the final.

At the 2010 Asian Games he finished sixth in the 200 metres and fourth in the 4 × 100 metres relay, but both results were annulled when it was revealed that Sathya had tested positive for nandrolone prior to the games. He was suspended from competition for two years for the anti-doping violation.
