= Poloni Avek =

Papua New Guinean middle-distance runner

Personal information
- Nationality: Papua New Guinean
- Born: 28 January 1966 (age 60)

Sport
- Sport: Middle-distance running
- Event: 1500 metres

Poloni D. Avek (born 28 January 1966) is a Papua New Guinean former middle-distance runner. She competed in the women's 1500 metres at the 1988 Summer Olympics.
