= Mereoni Vibose =

Fijian track and field athlete

Personal information
- Born: 26 April 1951 Nadroga, Fiji
- Died: 27 January 2018 (aged 66) Sigatoka, Fiji
- Occupation: Athlete

Sport
- Country: Fiji
- Sport: Discus and javelin
Medal record
Women's athletics
Representing Fiji
Oceania Athletics Championships
Bronze medal – third place	1990 Suva	Women's discus
Gold medal – first place	1990 Suva	Women's javelin
South Pacific Games
Silver medal – second place	1969 Port Moresby	Women's discus
Silver medal – second place	1969 Port Moresby	Women's javelin
Gold medal – first place	1975 Tumon	Women's javelin
Bronze medal – third place	1975 Tumon	Women's discus
Gold medal – first place	1979 Suva	Women's javelin
Silver medal – second place	1983 Apia	Women's discus
Silver medal – second place	1983 Apia	Women's javelin
Gold medal – first place	1987 Nouméa	Women's javelin
Bronze medal – third place	1991 Port Moresby	Women's discus

Mereoni Vibose (26 April 1951 – 27 January 2018) was a Fijian female track and field athlete who competed in the discus throw and javelin throw. She won nine South Pacific Games medals from 1969 to 1991 and set the Fijian record for javelin and discus at the National Athletics Championships. Vibose was inducted into the Fiji Sports Hall of Fame in 1998. She represented her country internationally at the World Championships in Athletics and at the Commonwealth Games.

== Biography ==
Vibose was born on 26 April 1951. She grew up in Nadroga, Fiji and was an athlete during her time at Adi Cakobau School.

In national championships, Vibose won 2 gold medals in javelin and discus each at the 1983 and 1987 National Athletics Championships in Fiji. During the championships, Vibose set the Fijian discus record in 1983 with 47.76 m and the Fijian javelin record in 1987 with 53.18 m. Alternatively, Vibose won nine South Pacific Games medals during her career. Her first South Pacific medals were a silver medal in the javelin and discus events at the 1969 South Pacific Games. Overall, Vibose won a total of nine medals at the South Pacific games.

Outside of the South Pacific, Vibose competed at the 1974 Commonwealth Games and the 1982 Commonwealth Games but did not medal. The following year, Vibose competed in the 1983 World Championships in Athletics in the javelin and discus events. After competing at the 1987 World Championships in Athletics in javelin, Vibose's final IAAF event was at the 1990 Oceania Athletics Championships where she won a bronze in discus and a gold in javelin. Vibose retired the following year in 1991. After her retirement, Vibose returned to athletics to compete in the 2016 World Masters Athletics Championships. Her best performance at the World Masters was fourth place in the javelin event.

In 1998, Vibose was inducted into the Fiji Sports Hall of Fame.

Vibose died on 27 January 2018 in Sigatoka, Fiji.
