= Jen Allred =

Guamanian long-distance runner (born 1961)

Jen Allred-Powless
Personal information
- Nationality: Guam
- Born: Jeanette Allred; December 17, 1961 (age 64) Los Angeles, California, United States

Sport
- Sport: Long-distance running
- Event: Marathon

Jeanette M. Allred-Powless (born December 17, 1961) is a Guamanian former long-distance runner. She competed in the women's marathon at the 1992 Summer Olympics. She also competed for Guam in seven World Athletics Championships and won three golds and a silver at the South Pacific Games. She was educated at American River College, California State University, Northridge, the University of North Florida and California State University, Sacramento. She set several age-group world records at Sacramento. After retiring from competition she took up coaching, acting as coach of the men's and women's running programs at Sierra College before joining her alma mater American River College in 2000 as head coach for women's track and field and cross country, where she led her track and field team to the third state title in ARC's history in 2007. She is the mother of professional cyclists Shayna Powless and Neilson Powless.
