= Mateaki Mafi =

Tonga international rugby league & union footballer & Olympic sprinter

Personal information
- Full name: Mateaki Fonnama'atonga Mafi
- Born: 19 September 1972 (age 53)
- Height: 178 cm (5 ft 10 in)
- Weight: 86 kg (13 st 8 lb)

Playing information

Rugby league
- Position: Wing
Club
Years	Team	Pld	T	G	FG	P
1995–97	Warrington Wolves	23	8	0	0	32
1997–98	Workington Town	7	3	0	0	12
	Total	30	11	0	0	44
Representative
Years	Team	Pld	T	G	FG	P
1995	Tonga

Rugby union
- Position: Wing
Club
Years	Team	Pld	T	G	FG	P
1998–99	Dunvant RFC
2000–0?	Bridgend RFC
200?–04	Taibach RFC
	Total	0	0	0	0	0
- Sports career
Medal record
Representing Tonga
Men's athletics
(South) Pacific Games
Bronze medal – third place	1991 Port Moresby	4x100 m relay
Bronze medal – third place	1991 Port Moresby	4x400 m relay

Mateaki Fonnama'atonga Mafi, also known by the nickname of "Matti", is a Tongan dual-code international rugby union and rugby league footballer, and sprinter. He played representative rugby union (RU) for Tonga and representative rugby league (RL) for Tonga, most notably at the 1995 Rugby League World Cup, and participated at the 1992 Summer Olympics as a 200m sprinter.

== Athletic career ==
Mafi was a 200m sprinter and as a 19-year-old represented Tonga at the 1992 Summer Olympics in Barcelona. He finished fifth in his heat and failed to make the quarterfinals.

== Rugby union career ==
Mafi was a rugby union player in the Tongan domestic competition.

== Rugby league career ==
Mafi switched to rugby league in 1995, joining the Warrington Wolves in England. He was named in the Tongan squad for the 1995 World Cup. Along with Willie Swann and Martin Dermott, Mafi was sacked by Warrington early in the 1997 season after the club had a poor start to the season.

== Return to rugby union ==
Mafi then returned to rugby union, joining Dunvant RFC in Wales. In 2000 he moved to the Bridgend RFC, before finishing his career with the Taibach RFC. He retired in 2004.

During his time in rugby union he represented Tonga at rugby sevens and also played for the Barbarians FC.

== Later years ==
Mafi now works as a security officer at the St Davids Dewi Sant Shopping Centre in Cardiff. He also shows his Neapolitan Mastiffs at dog shows, winning two awards at the 2008 Crufts.

== Achievements in athletics ==
Year	Competition	Venue	Position	Event	Notes
Representing Tonga
1991	South Pacific Games	Port Moresby, Papua New Guinea	3rd	4 × 100 m relay	41.20 s
1991	South Pacific Games	Port Moresby, Papua New Guinea	3rd	4 × 400 m relay	3:19.53 min
