= Davendra Singh (athlete) =

Fijian middle-distance runner

Personal information
- Full name: Davendra Prakash Singh
- Nationality: Fijian
- Born: 19 September 1965 (age 60)

Sport
- Sport: Middle-distance running
- Event: Steeplechase
Medal record
Men's athletics
Representing Fiji
(South) Pacific Games
Gold medal – first place	1991 Port Moresby	1500m
Gold medal – first place	1991 Port Moresby	3000m Steeplechase
Gold medal – first place	1991 Port Moresby	5000m

Davendra Prakash Singh (born 19 September 1965) is a Fijian middle-distance runner. He competed in the 3000 metres steeplechase at the 1988 Summer Olympics and the 1992 Summer Olympics.
