= Lui Muavesi =

Fijian middle-distance runner

Personal information
- Nationality: Fijian
- Born: 25 February 1966 (age 60)

Sport
- Sport: Middle-distance running
- Event: 800 metres

Lui Muavesi (born 25 February 1966) is a Fijian former middle-distance runner. He competed in the men's 800 metres at the 1988 Summer Olympics.
