= Homelo Vi =

Tongan decathlete

Personal information
- Nationality: Tongan
- Born: 5 August 1967 (age 57); Tongatapu, Tonga

Sport
- Sport: Athletics
- Event: Decathlon

Homelo Vi (born 5 August 1967) is a Tongan athlete. He competed in the men's decathlon at the 1992 Summer Olympics.
