= Peauope Suli =

Tongan sprinter (born 1963)

Personal information
- Nationality: Tongan
- Born: 18 October 1963 (age 62)

Sport
- Sport: Sprinting
- Event: 100 metres

Peauope Suli Fifita (born 18 October 1963) is a Tongan former sprinter. He competed in the men's 100 metres at the 1988 Summer Olympics.
