= Guadalcanal Province =

Province of the Solomon Islands

Guadalcanal Province Guadalkanal Provins (Pijin)
- Province
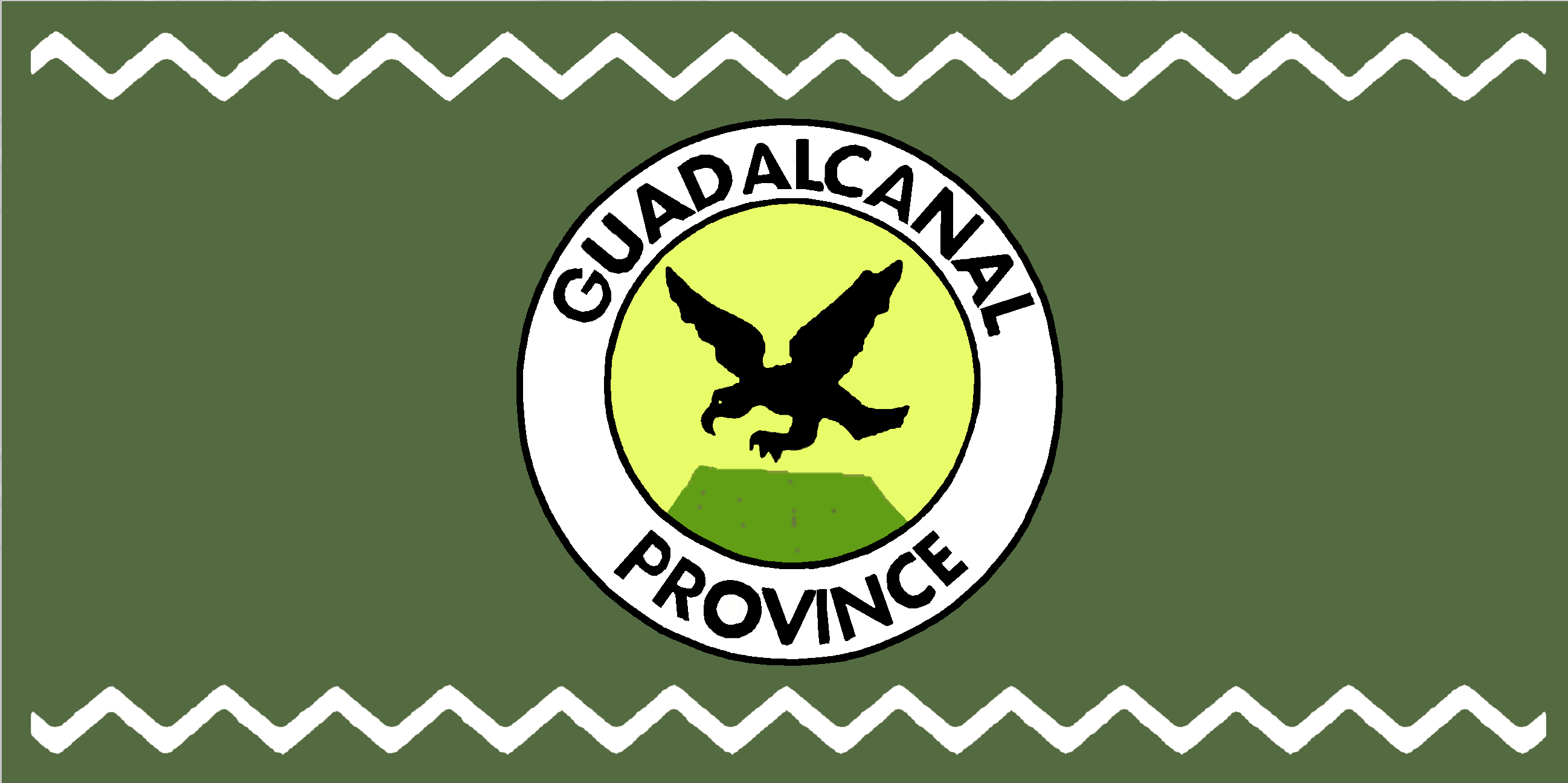
- Flag

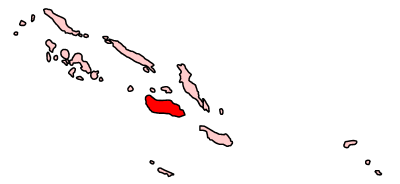
- Coordinates: 9°45′S 160°0′E
- Country: Solomon Islands
- Capital: Honiara

Government
  - Premier: Hon. Willie Atu

Area
  - Total: 5,336 km^{2} (2,060 sq mi)

Population (2019 census)
  - Total: 154,022
  - Density: 28.86/km^{2} (74.76/sq mi)
- Time zone: UTC+11 (+11)
- ISO 3166 code: SB-GU

Guadalcanal Province is one of the nine provinces of Solomon Islands, consisting primarily of the island of Guadalcanal. Its area is 5,336 km^{2} (2,060 sq mi) and is largely jungle. Its name was given by Pedro de Ortega Valencia, born in the village of Guadalcanal, Seville, Spain. The national capital and largest city of Solomon Islands, Honiara, is on the island. In July 1983, Honiara was designated a 22 km^{2} (8.5 sq mi) separately-administered Capital Territory and is no longer considered part of the province.

The population of the province as of 2019 is 154,022. The population of the island, including Honiara, is 283,591. Honiara serves as the provincial capital. The climate is that of a tropical rainforest.

== World War II ==
The island became the scene of the important Guadalcanal Campaign during World War II. The Office of Weapons Removal and Abatement in the Department of State's Bureau of Political-Military Affairs established an explosive ordnance disposal training program. It safely disposed of hundreds of items of UXO, and it trained police personnel to respond to EOD call-outs in the island's highly populated areas.

== Administrative divisions ==
Guadalcanal Province is sub-divided into the following constituencies (or electoral districts), which are further sub-divided into wards (with populations at the 2009 and 2019 Censuses respectively):

Name		Population (2009 census)			Population (2019 census)		
Name		Total	Male	Female	Total	Male	Female
33. – North West Guadalcanal		21,424	11,231	10,193	44,086	22,778	21,308
33.01.	Tandai	14,914	7,785	7,129	33,056	17,040	16,016
33.02.	Saghalu	6,510	3,446	3,064	11,030	5,738	5,292
34. – West Guadalcanal		9,569	5,007	4,562	12,199	6,370	5,829
34.03.	Savulei	3,003	1,582	1,421	4,331	2,287	2,044
34.04.	Tangarare	3,118	1,633	1,485	3,852	2,002	1,850
34.05.	Wanderer Bay	3,448	1,792	1,656	4,016	2,081	1,935
35. – South Guadalcanal		6,739	3,324	3,415	10,462	5,213	5,249
35.06.	Duidui	3,201	1,631	1,570	5,300	2,691	2,609
35.07.	Vatukulau	1,822	864	958	2,534	1,230	1,304
35.08.	Talise	1,716	829	887	2,628	1,292	1,336
36. – East Guadalcanal		10,231	5,002	5,229	13,065	6,421	6,644
36.09.	Avuavu	2,262	1,096	1,166	2,913	1,432	1,481
36.10.	Moli	3,696	1,786	1,910	4,507	2,177	2,330
36.11.	Tetekanji	1,114	531	583	1,602	757	845
36.12.	Birao	3,159	1,589	1,570	4,043	2,055	1,988
37. – East/Central Guadalcanal		10,706	5,472	5,234	15,691	8,052	7,639
37.13.	Valasi	1,477	746	731	2,070	1,048	1,022
37.14.	Kolokarako	1,418	715	703	2,647	1,346	1,301
37.15.	Longgu	3,767	1,946	1,821	4,597	2,389	2,208
37.16.	Aola	4,044	2,065	1,979	6,377	3,269	3,108
38. – North East Guadalcanal		10,506	5,472	5,034	13,930	7,167	6,763
38.17.	Paripao	3,068	1,555	1,513	3,842	1,969	1,873
38.18.	East Tasimboko	7,438	3,917	3,521	10,088	5,198	4,890
39. – North Guadalcanal		9,477	4,941	4,536	13,675	7,019	6,656
39.21.	West Ghaobata	4,962	2,573	2,389	7,453	3,805	3,648
39.22.	East Ghaobata	4,515	2,368	2,147	6,222	3,214	3,008
40. – Central Guadalcanal		14,961	7,834	7,127	30,914	15,952	14,962
40.19.	Vulolo	4,429	2,294	2,135	6,265	3,200	3,065
40.20.	Malango	10,532	5,540	4,992	24,649	12,752	11,897
Total		93,613	48,283	45,330	154,022	78,972	75,050

== Guadalcanal Provincial Assembly ==
The Guadalcanal Provincial Assembly is one of the nine provincial assemblies in the Solomon Islands. Guadalcanal received its Devolution Order in 1984 from the Area Council. The Devolution Order gives the provinces some autonomy to administer certain services and also allows the province to create its own ordinances.

== Office of the Provincial Assembly ==
The Guadalcanal Provincial Assembly Office is administered by the Honorable Speaker. The Honorable Speaker of the 9th Provincial Assembly (2019 - 2023) is Honorable Peter Aoraunisaka. He was a longtime member of the Royal Solomon Islands Police Force (RSIPF).

The Provincial Assembly Office also has a Clerk of the Assembly. The Clerk of Guadalcanal Provincial Assembly (2019 - 2023) was Edward Juvia.

== Premiership ==
The first honorable premier of Guadalcanal Province is David Rosalio, from Savulei Ward. He was elected in 1984 under the Area Council and transitioned as the first Premier from 1985 to 1988.

The premier of Guadalcanal Province from 2019 until 2024 was Francis Sade, who entered office after the 2019 provincial election. Premier Sade is the first Premier of Guadalcanal to hold office for a full 4 year term since 1985. He entered office with a provincial debt of more than SI$30,000,000. He also faced challenges during the COVID-19 pandemic.

Despite these hardships, Premier Sade managed to enact fiscal reforms for the Guadalcanal Provincial Government with debt-servicing and revenue collections. The current debt of the provincial government in the 2023–2024 fiscal year was believed to be less than SI$2,000,000. Premier Sade also reformed human resources and policies.

The current Premier of Guadalcanal Province as of 2024 is Willie Atu.
