= Lakafia =

Lakafia is a surname. Notable people with the surname include:

- Jean-Paul Lakafia (born 1961), French javelin thrower
- Pierre-Gilles Lakafia (born 1987), French rugby union player
- Raphaël Lakafia (born 1988), French rugby union player, brother of Pierre-Gilles and son of Jean-Paul
