= List of Niuean records in athletics =

The following are the national records in athletics in Niue maintained by Niue's national athletics federation: Niue Athletics Association.

== Outdoor ==
Key to tables: Awaiting ratification Record not kept by Niue Athletics Association Not ratified or later rescinded Niue Athletics Association

# = not ratified by federation

=== Men ===
Event	Record	Athlete	Date	Meet	Place	Ref.
100 m	10.54 (+0.9 m/s)	Lagaua Patuavalu a.k.a. Isaac Tatoa	22 March 2013	New Zealand Championships	Auckland, New Zealand	
200 m	22.00 (+1.0 m/s)	Lagaua Patuavalu a.k.a. Isaac Tatoa	19 March 2011		Auckland, New Zealand	
400 m	52.87	Kalapu Liutose Liuvaie	13 September 1991	South Pacific Games	Port Moresby, Papua New Guinea	
800 m	2:09.91	John Malcolm	8 September 1983	South Pacific Games	Apia, Western Samoa	
1500 m	4:43.08	John Malcolm	11 September 1983	South Pacific Games	Apia, Western Samoa	
3000 m						
5000 m	20:01.2 h	Palana Ahotala	12 September 1983	South Pacific Games	Apia, Western Samoa	
10,000 m	34:17.1 h	Palana Ahotala	16 October 1982		Paliati, Niue	
Marathon	3:30:00	Simpson Ikimau	19 October 1982		Paliati, Niue	
110 m hurdles	20.17 (−3.1 m/s)	John William Tutaki	3 September 1979	South Pacific Games	Suva, Fiji	
400 m hurdles	1:04.11	Tom Dooley Jackson	30 August 1979	South Pacific Games	Suva, Fiji	
3000 m steeplechase	11:51.20	Pihigia Talagi	1 September 1979	South Pacific Games	Suva, Fiji	
High jump	1.74 m	James Tonga	16 October 1982		Paliati, Niue	
Pole vault	3.10 m^{†}	John Kumitau	7 September 1979	South Pacific Games	Suva, Fiji	
Long jump	6.26 m (−2.8 m/s)	Billy Paea	13 December 2001	South Pacific Mini Games	Middlegate, Norfolk Island	
Triple jump	13.42 m	Ian Hipa	16 October 1982		Paliati, Niue	
Shot put	12.13 m	Nia Misikea	8 April 2018	Commonwealth Games	Gold Coast, Australia	
Discus throw	39.23 m	Jinnam Hopotoa	6 September 2013	Pacific Mini Games	Mata-Utu, Wallis and Futuna	
Hammer throw						
Javelin throw	53.91 m	Nia Misikea	11 December 2017	Pacific Mini Games	Port Vila, Vanuatu	
Decathlon	4552 pts^{‡}	John Kumitau	6–7 September 1979	South Pacific Games	Suva, Fiji	
Decathlon	100m / Long jump / Shot put / High jump / 400m / 110m H / Discus / Pole vault / Javelin / 1500m; 12.33 / 5.87m / 8.90m / 1.54m / 54.32 / 23.07 / 22.58m / 3.10m / 47.54m / 5:03.6					
20 km walk (road)						
50 km walk (road)						
4 × 100 m relay	42.95	Niue; Billi Paea; Afele Leona; Lupo Kumitau; Mathew Faleuka	30 July 2002	Commonwealth Games	Manchester, United Kingdom	
4 × 400 m relay	3:42.45	Niue; Hakemotu Laufoli; Hetutu; Atitili Helagi; Tom Dooley Jackson	7 September 1979	South Pacific Games	Suva, Fiji	

^{†}: result obtained during the decathlon.
^{‡}: 4,655 pts by another source.

=== Women ===
Event	Record	Athlete	Date	Meet	Place	Ref.
100 m	13.33 (+0.4 m/s)	Jade Roughan	29 June 2012	Oceania Area Championships	Cairns, Queensland, Australia	
100 m	12.62	Jade Roughan	2003		Australia	
100 m	12.59 #	Jade Roughan	29 September 2007		Tumbi Umbi, New South Wales, Australia	
100 m	12.5 h	Jade Roughan	16 March 2003		Sydney, Australia	
200 m	27.94	Zelda Folau Brown	13 December 1993	South Pacific Mini Games	Port Vila, Vanuatu	
200 m	27.76^{†}	Jade Roughan	5 September 2002		Sydney, Australia	
200 m	26.1 h	Jade Roughan	15/16 March 2003		Sydney, Australia	
400 m	1:04.36	Zelda Folau Brown	13 December 1993	South Pacific Mini Games	Port Vila, Vanuatu	
800 m	2:40.37	Irene Laufoi	8 September 1983	South Pacific Games	Apia, Western Samoa	
1500 m	5:50.5 h	Judy Tauevihi	20 October 1981		Niue	
3000 m	13:21.62	Irene Laufoi	10 September 1983	South Pacific Games	Apia, Western Samoa	
5000 m						
10,000 m						
Marathon						
100 m hurdles						
400 m hurdles						
3000 m steeplechase						
High jump	1.45 m	Taukehehiva Tuhega	20 October 1981		Niue	
High jump	1.46 m^{†}	Jade Roughan	5 September 2002		Sydney, Australia	
High jump	1.50 m^{†} #	Jade Roughan	5 August 2005		Sydney, Australia	
Pole vault						
Long jump	4.51 m	Zelda Folau Brown	24 February 1994	Oceania Junior Championships	Auckland, New Zealand	
Long jump	4.85 m	Sinead Misiagi Tohilima	15 March 2003	Auckland Children's Athletics Championships	Auckland, New Zealand	
Long jump	5.23 m #	Sinead Misiagi Tohilima	28 March 2004		Inglewood, New Zealand	
Triple jump	9.57 m	Dinah Lee Jackson	1980		Vaiea, Niue	
Shot put	9.26 m	Amanda Tamate	15 December 1993	South Pacific Mini Games	Port Vila, Vanuatu	
Shot put	10.97 m	Sinead Misiagi Tohilima	29 March 2008	New Zealand Junior Championships	Auckland, New Zealand	
Discus throw	29.90 m	Jade Roughan	August 2004		Sydney, Australia	
Hammer throw						
Javelin throw						
Heptathlon						
Heptathlon	100m H / High jump / Shot put / 200m / Long jump / Javelin / 800m					
20 km walk (road)						
4 × 100 m relay	53.10	Niue; Dinah Lee Jackson (?); Deanna Morgan-Makea; Zelda Folau Brown; Maryanne Sifaheone	26 February 1994	Oceania Junior Championships	Auckland, New Zealand	
4 × 400 m relay	4:56.6 h		20 October 1980		Vaiea, Niue	

^{†}: result obtained during the pentathlon.

== Indoor ==
=== Men ===
Event	Record	Athlete	Date	Meet	Place	Ref.
60 m						
200 m						
400 m						
800 m						
1500 m						
3000 m						
60 m hurdles						
High jump						
Pole vault						
Long jump						
Triple jump						
Shot put						
Heptathlon						
Heptathlon	60m / Long jump / Shot put / High jump / 60m H / Pole vault / 1000m					
5000 m walk						
4 × 400 m relay						

=== Women ===
Event	Record	Athlete	Date	Meet	Place	Ref.
60 m						
200 m						
400 m						
800 m						
1500 m						
3000 m						
60 m hurdles						
High jump						
Pole vault						
Long jump						
Triple jump						
Shot put						
Pentathlon						
Pentathlon	60m H / High jump / Shot put / Long jump / 800m					
3000 m walk						
4 × 400 m relay						
