= Niue Athletics Association =

- Sport: Athletics
- Abbreviation: NAA
- Regional affiliation: OAA (associate member)
- Affiliation date: 2009
- Headquarters: Alofi North
- President: Roz Tafatu-Hipa
- Vice president: Moira Jackson
- Secretary: Rupina Morrissey
- (Niue)

The Niue Athletics Association (NAA) is the governing body for the sport of athletics in Niue.

== History ==
Athletes from Niue participated already at the 1979, 1983, 1991, and 2003 South Pacific Games, the 1993, and 2001 South Pacific Mini Games, and the 2002 and 2006 Commonwealth Games. They also took part at the 1994 Senior/Open and Junior Oceania Athletics Championships.

It is reported, that NAA was "revived" in 2007, and was affiliated to the OAA as associate member in the year 2009.

In 2011, Niue applied to World Athletics (then the International Association of Athletics Federations) for membership, but was rejected as it was considered a territory of New Zealand.

== Affiliations ==
- Oceania Athletics Association (OAA) as associate member

Moreover, it is part of the following national organisations:

- Niue Island Sports Commonwealth Games Association (NISCGA)

== National records ==
NAA maintains the Niuean records in athletics.
