= Elanga =

Elanga is a name that may refer to the following notable people:

Given name

- Elanga Buala, (1964–2021), sprinter from Papua New Guinea
- Elanga Wikramanayake, Sri Lankan lawyer

Surname

- Anthony Elanga (born 2002), Swedish football player
- Joseph Elanga (born 1979), Cameroonian football defender
- Pierre Hervé Ateme Elanga (born 1986), Cameroonian football player
