= Athletics at the 1983 South Pacific Games =

Athletics at the VII South Pacific Games
- Dates: September 8–15
- Host city: Apia, Western Samoa
- Level: Senior
- Events: 38 (22 men, 16 women)
- Participation: 15 nations
- Records set: 14

Athletics competitions at the 1983 South Pacific Games were held in Apia, Western Samoa, between September 8–15, 1983.

A total of 38 events were contested, 22 by men and 16 by women.

== Medal summary ==
=== Men ===
Event	Gold		Silver		Bronze	
100 metres	Georges Taniel (VAN)	10.94	Johnson Kere (SOL)	10.96	Jerry Jeremiah (VAN); Georges Jubely (PYF)	11.01
200 metres	Lapule Tamean (PNG)	21.78	Inoke Bainimoli (FIJ)	21.83	Georges Taniel (VAN)	22.05
400 metres	Joe Rodan (FIJ)	48.91	Lapule Tamean (PNG)	49.29	Jerry Jeremiah (VAN)	49.81
800 metres	Richard Kermode (FIJ)	1:58.43	Charlie Oliver (SOL)	1:59.37	Eric Becker (NCL)	2:00.04
1500 metres	Alain Lazare (NCL)	3:59.81	Richard Kermode (FIJ)	3:59.86	Jean-Louis Bounhoure (PYF)	4:04.78
5000 metres^{†}	Alain Lazare (NCL)	15:07.8 (ht)	Jean-Louis Bounhoure (PYF)	15:10.8 (ht)	Tau John Tokwepota (PNG)	15:22.2 (ht)
10000 metres	Alain Lazare (NCL)	31:55.11 GR	Jean-Louis Bounhoure (PYF)	32:08.36	Shiri Chand (FIJ)	33:17.94
Marathon	Alain Lazare (NCL)	2:28:30	Jean-Louis Bounhoure (PYF)	2:36:50	Birendra Prasad (FIJ)	2:38:50
3000 metres steeplechase	Alain Lazare (NCL)	9:27.84	Shiri Chand (FIJ)	9:55.36	Tau John Tokwepota (PNG)	10:02.25
110 metres hurdles^{†}	William Fong (SAM)	14.5 (ht) GR	Albert Miller (FIJ)	14.7 (ht)	Sakaraia Tuva (FIJ)	15.5 (ht)
400 metres hurdles	Joe Rodan (FIJ)	54.17	Paiwa Bogela (PNG)	54.58	Daniel Dam (VAN); Yves Martin (PYF)	55.30
High jump	Vetea Dehors (PYF)	2.00	Clément Poaniewa (NCL)	1.97	Guillaume Vendegou (NCL)	1.94
Pole vault	Yves Obry (NCL)	4.10	Jean-Luc Mu Kwai Chuan (PYF)	4.00	Stanley Wolfgramm (TGA)	3.95
Long jump	Armand Welepa (NCL)	6.89	Jacques Blanc (NCL)	6.88	Yannick Talon (NCL)	6.70
Triple jump	Jean Fantozzi (NCL)	14.69	Clément Poaniewa (NCL)	14.68	Yannick Talon (NCL)	14.29
Shot put	Arnjolt Beer (NCL)	16.97	Henry Smith (SAM)	16.64	Iafeta Sua'mene (SAM)	15.47
Discus throw	Henry Smith (SAM)	49.56	Arnjolt Beer (NCL)	48.70	Jean-Claude Duhaze (PYF)	46.90
Hammer throw	Frédéric Cassier (NCL)	56.78 GR	Jean-Claude Duhaze (PYF)	54.28	Martial Bone (NCL)	49.54
Javelin throw	Jean-Paul Lakafia (NCL)	84.74 GR	Péta Tauhavili (NCL)	77.68	Fapiano Fakataulavelua (WLF)	76.10
Decathlon	Albert Miller (FIJ)	6870 GR	Jean-Paul Lakafia (NCL)	5835	James Iroga (SOL)	5451
4 x 100 metres relay	Fiji; Inoke Bainimoli; Penasio Cerecere; Peni Bati; Isireli Kasainaseva	42.17	Papua New Guinea; Tony Aiam; Peter Henry; Vali Ligo; Lapule Tamean	42.65	French Polynesia	42.96
4 x 400 metres relay	Papua New Guinea; Paiwa Bogela; Aloysius Patuku; Dibili Wagamisi; Lapule Tamean	3:21.04	Fiji	3:21.15	Vanuatu	3:22.79

^{†}:The Fully Automatic Timing failed on September 12, and hand times (ht) were then used.

=== Women ===
Event	Gold		Silver		Bronze	
100 metres	Miriama Chambault (FIJ)	12.39	Albertine An (PYF)	12.45	Barbara Ingiro (PNG)	12.49
200 metres	Elanga Buala (PNG)	25.19	Albertine An (PYF)	25.46	Barbara Ingiro (PNG)	25.49
400 metres	Elanga Buala (PNG)	57.68	Barbara Ingiro (PNG)	58.54	Mary Estelle Kapalu (VAN)	59.05
800 metres	Attina Sawtell (COK)	2:17.73 GR	Kim Petersen (SAM)	2:19.83	Elanga Buala (PNG)	2:19.85
1500 metres	Nadia Bernard (NCL)	4:44.71 GR	Attina Sawtell (COK)	4:50.11	Maria Berenadetta (FIJ)	4:57.58
3000 metres	Nadia Bernard (NCL)	10:51.47	Mary Sanderson (PNG)	11:25.37	Nerrie Sine (PNG)	11:29.17
100 metres hurdles	Brigitte Hardel (NCL)	14.67 GR	Miriama Chambault (NCL)	15.13	Albertine An (PYF)	15.20
400 metres hurdles	Léonne Ley (PYF)	63.27 GR	Kim Petersen (SAM)	63.89	Kari Kapani (PNG)	69.84
High jump	Albertine An (PYF)	1.65	Angela Pule (SAM)	1.65	Véronique Vernay (NCL)	1.63
Long jump	Brigitte Hardel (NCL)	5.70	Miriama Chambault (NCL)	5.42	Véronique Palaou (NCL)	5.10
Shot put	Marie-Christine Sealeu (NCL)	13.59 GR	Georgina Peko (ASA)	13.17	Evelyne Filikesa (NCL)	13.15
Discus throw	Marie-Christine Sealeu (NCL)	46.42 GR	Mereoni Vibose (FIJ)	43.64	Evelyne Filikesa (NCL)	39.32
Javelin throw	Monika Fiafialoto (WLF)	53.02 GR	Mereoni Vibose (FIJ)	51.24	Malia-Losa Tuiasoa (WLF)	48.02
Heptathlon	Iammo Launa (PNG)	4613 GR	Véronique Palaou (NCL)	4203	Angela Pule (SAM)	4129
4 x 100 metres relay	French Polynesia	48.70	Papua New Guinea; Elanga Buala; Kari Kapani; Barbara Ingiro; Yal Jonathon	49.08	New Caledonia; Fabienna Blanc; Miriama Chambault; Gladys Cure; Alice Teimbouanou	49.80
4 x 400 metres relay	Papua New Guinea; Elanga Buala; Barbara Ingiro; Yal Jonathon; Kari Kapani	4:03.17 GR	Fiji	4:08.66	Samoa	4:09.88

== Medal table (unofficial) ==
* Host nation (Western Samoa)

Rank	Nation	Gold	Silver	Bronze	Total
1	New Caledonia (NCL)	18	9	10	37
2	Papua New Guinea (PNG)	6	6	7	19
3	Fiji (FIJ)	5	8	4	17
4	French Polynesia (PYF)	4	7	6	17
5	Western Samoa (WSM)*	2	4	3	9
6	Cook Islands (COK)	1	1	0	2
7	Vanuatu (VAN)	1	0	6	7
8	Wallis and Futuna (WLF)	1	0	2	3
9	Solomon Islands (SOL)	0	2	1	3
10	American Samoa (ASA)	0	1	0	1
11	Tonga (TON)	0	0	1	1
Totals (11 entries)		38	38	40	116

== Participation (unofficial) ==
Athletes from the following 15 countries were reported to participate:

- American Samoa
- Cook Islands
- Fiji
- French Polynesia
- Guam
- Nauru
- New Caledonia
- Niue
- Northern Mariana Islands
- Papua New Guinea
- Solomon Islands
- Tonga
- Vanuatu
- Wallis and Futuna
- Western Samoa
