= Athletics at the 1981 South Pacific Mini Games =

Athletics at the I South Pacific Mini Games
- Dates: July 8–16
- Host city: Honiara, Solomon Islands
- Level: Senior
- Events: 36 (22 men, 14 women)
- Participation: 14 nations

Athletics competitions at the 1981 South Pacific Mini Games were held in Honiara, Solomon Islands, between July 8–16, 1981.

A total of 36 events were contested, 22 by men and 14 by women.

== Medal summary ==
Medal winners and their results were published on the Athletics Weekly webpage courtesy of Tony Isaacs and Børre Lilloe, and on the Oceania Athletics Association webpage by Bob Snow.

Complete results can also be found on the Oceania Athletics Association, and on the Athletics PNG webpages.

=== Men ===
Event	Gold		Silver		Bronze	
100 metres	Patrice Manuel (PYF)	11.09	Georges Taniel (VAN)	11.12	Jim Marau (SOL)	11.15
200 metres (wind: +1.7 m/s)	Lapule Tamean (PNG)	22.45	Joe Rodan (FIJ)	22.60	Jim Marau (SOL)	22.70
400 metres	Lapule Tamean (PNG)	49.29	Joe Rodan (FIJ)	49.65	Aloysius Patuku (PNG)	50.85
800 metres	Charlie Oliver (SOL)	1:56.01	Aaron Hitu (SOL)	1:57.52	Ilimotama Daku (FIJ)	1:57.83
1500 metres	Gérard Charlot (NCL)	4:07.30	Charlie Oliver (SOL)	4:07.71	Sawelio Lutuni (FIJ)	4:11.02
5000 metres	Alain Lazare (NCL)	15:51.08	Abel Manumanua (PNG)	15:55.53	Matthew Hovaisuta (SOL)	16:09.86
10000 metres	Alain Lazare (NCL)	32:39.50	Tau John Tokwepota (PNG)	32:43.30	Shiri Chand (FIJ)	33:01.07
Marathon	Shiri Chand (FIJ)	2:36:15	Tau John Tokwepota (PNG)	2:38:55	Abel Manumanua (PNG)	2:46:09
3000 metres steeplechase	Alain Lazare (NCL)	9:36.01	Tau John Tokwepota (PNG)	9:59.42	Shiri Chand (FIJ)	10:04.43
110 metres hurdles (wind: -0.4 m/s)	William Fong (SAM)	15.63	Willie Kalotiti (VAN)	16.11	Sioape Nuku (TGA)	16.12
400 metres hurdles	Joe Rodan (FIJ)	54.30	Daniel Dam (VAN)	56.94	Henri Brillant (PYF)	58.33
High jump	Clément Poaniewa (NCL)	2.00	Vetea Dehors (PYF)	1.88	Joël Bellenguez (NCL)	1.84
Pole vault	Yves Obry (NCL)	3.80	Armand Welepa (NCL)	3.50	Niulolo Prescott (TGA)	3.30
Long jump	Armand Welepa (NCL)	7.09	Jacques Blanc (NCL)	6.90	Paul Pirigau (SOL)	6.75
Triple jump	Yannick Talon (NCL)	15.27	Jean Fantozzi (NCL)	14.38	Anska Ouou (SOL)	13.35
Shot put	Martial Bone (NCL)	15.30	Frédéric Cassier (NCL)	15.02	Jean-Claude Duhaze (PYF)	14.99
Discus throw	Jean-Claude Duhaze (PYF)	47.46	Frédéric Cassier (NCL)	44.74	Martial Bone (NCL)	43.66
Hammer throw	Jean-Claude Duhaze (PYF)	53.38	Frédéric Cassier (NCL)	51.46	Martial Bone (NCL)	47.44
Javelin throw	Soane-Malia Tuugahala (WLF)	65.36	Vito Puaka (NCL)	64.48	Sosefo Tini (NCL)	61.06
Pentathlon	Niulolo Prescott (TGA)	2953	Clément Poaniewa (NCL)	2899	Sylvester Diake (SOL)	2869
4 x 100 metres relay	French Polynesia; Vetea Dehors; Georges Jubely; Patrice Manuel; Simplicio Amaru	42.99	Solomon Islands; Frank Hana; Leo; Benedict Esibaea; Jim Marau	43.50	New Caledonia; Armand Welepa; Michel Karno; Yannick Talon; Albert Hmuzo	43.60
4 x 400 metres relay	Fiji; Joe Rodan; Joe Logavatu; Sawelio Lutuni; Ilimo Daku	3:22.61	Solomon Islands; Frank Hana; James Iroga; Aron Hitu; Charlie Oliver	3:23.30	Vanuatu; Daniel Dam; Reynolds Alatoa; George Taniel; Johnny Kahi	3:26.97

=== Women ===
Event	Gold		Silver		Bronze	
100 metres (wind: +0.3 m/s)	Brigitte Hardel (NCL)	12.34	Albertine An (PYF)	12.48	Miriama Chambault (FIJ)	12.60
200 metres (wind: +2.9 m/s)	Brigitte Hardel (NCL)	25.33 w	Albertine An (PYF)	25.79 w	Elanga Buala (PNG)	26.26 w
400 metres	Salitia Muga (PNG)	58.31	Elanga Buala (PNG)	58.60	Loata Turagavuli (FIJ)	60.22
800 metres	Salitia Muga (PNG)	2:21.42	Attina Sawtell (COK)	2:27.90	Frances Whippy (VAN)	2:28.57
1500 metres	Salitia Muga (PNG)	4:54.90	Attina Sawtell (COK)	4:58.38	Nerrie Sine (PNG)	5:00.77
3000 metres	Nerrie Sine (PNG)	12:00.04	Rennie Rere (COK)	12:06.96	Maria Taburoqoti (FIJ)	12:11.35
100 metres hurdles (wind: +0.3 m/s)	Miriama Chambault (NCL)	15.29	Sainiana Tukana (FIJ)	15.49	Isabelle Nicolas (VAN)	16.40
High jump	Pascale Bouvet (NCL)	1.54	Marie-Hélène Yekawe (NCL)	1.54	Albertine An (PYF)	1.50
Long jump	Brigitte Hardel (NCL)	6.02 w (wind: +2.6 m/s)	Miriama Chambault (NCL)	5.75	Sainiana Tukana (FIJ)	5.48 w
Shot put	Evelyne Filikesa (NCL)	11.83	Marie-Lucie Pauga (NCL)	11.68	Maryline Adam (VAN)	11.27
Discus throw	Sandra Bordes (PYF)	40.40	Anna Tulitau (NCL)	35.94	Evelyne Filikesa (NCL)	35.20
Javelin throw	Marina Heafala (NCL)	46.68	Anna Tulitau (NCL)	40.68	Malia-Losa Tiniloa (WLF)	38.00
4 x 100 metres relay	Fiji; Loata Turagavuli; Sainiana Tukana; Alena Waqasiwa; Filomena Watirakala	50.58	French Polynesia; Sandra Yansaud; Leonne Ley; Albertine An; Tatiana Bennett	50.67	Solomon Islands; Mary Joyce; Jane Kalu; Stella Gelli; Bingo	55.24
4 x 400 metres relay	Papua New Guinea; Elanga Buala; Nerrie Sine; Barbara Ingiro; Salitia Muga	4:02.72	New Caledonia; Véronique Palaou; Brigitte Hardel; Karen Parage; Patricia Rouby	4:04.82	Fiji; Loata Turagavuli; Sainiana Tukana; Anasa Navavia; Alena Waqasiwa	4:09.92

== Medal table (unofficial) ==
* Host nation (Solomon Islands)

Rank	Nation	Gold	Silver	Bronze	Total
1	New Caledonia (NCL)	16	14	7	37
2	Papua New Guinea (PNG)	7	5	4	16
3	French Polynesia (PYF)	5	4	3	12
4	Fiji (FIJ)	4	3	8	15
5	Solomon Islands (SOL)*	1	4	7	12
6	Tonga (TON)	1	0	2	3
7	Wallis and Futuna (WLF)	1	0	1	2
8	Western Samoa (WSM)	1	0	0	1
9	Vanuatu (VAN)	0	3	4	7
10	Cook Islands (COK)	0	3	0	3
Totals (10 entries)		36	36	36	108

== Participation (unofficial) ==
Athletes from the following 14 countries were reported to participate:

- Cook Islands
- Fiji
- French Polynesia
- Guam
- Kiribati
- Nauru
- New Caledonia
- Northern Mariana Islands
- Papua New Guinea
- Solomon Islands
- Tonga
- Vanuatu
- Wallis and Futuna
- Western Samoa
