= Athletics at the 2014 Commonwealth Games – Men's javelin throw =

Men's javelin throw at the Commonwealth Games
- Venue: Hampden Park
- Dates: 1 August (qualifying round); 2 August (final)
- Competitors: 22 from 15 nations
- Winning distance: 83.87 m

Medalists
gold medal	Julius Yego	Kenya
silver medal	Keshorn Walcott	Trinidad and Tobago
bronze medal	Hamish Peacock	Australia

The Men's javelin throw at the 2014 Commonwealth Games as part of the athletics programme took place at Hampden Park between 1 and 2 August 2014.

== Results ==
=== Qualifying round ===
Qualification: Qualifying Performance 78.00 (Q) or at least 12 best performers (q) advance to the Final.

Rank	Athlete	Group	#1	#2	#3	Result	Notes
1	B	Keshorn Walcott (TTO)	85.28			85.28	Q, NR
2	A	Julius Yego (KEN)	82.83			82.83	Q
3	B	Luke Cann (AUS)	79.36			79.36	Q, PB
4	A	Hamish Peacock (AUS)	73.35	79.08		79.08	Q
5	B	Stuart Farquhar (NZL)	78.54			78.54	Q
6	B	Joshua Robinson (AUS)	73.36	78.32		78.32	Q
7	A	Rocco van Rooyen (RSA)	71.55	72.79	77.57	77.57	q
8	A	Lee Doran (WAL)	71.57	75.82	x	75.82	q
9	A	Leslie Copeland (FIJ)	x	70.99	75.59	75.59	q
10	B	John Ampomah (GHA)	68.83	67.73	73.85	73.85	q
11	A	Ravinder Singh Khaira (IND)	72.18	71.78	69.10	72.18	q
12	B	Vipin Kasana (IND)	68.87	-	71.95	71.95	q
13	B	James Campbell (SCO)	69.08	67.91	70.78	70.78	SB
14	B	Davinder Singh (IND)	63.55	63.46	70.56	70.56	
15	B	Joe Dunderdale (ENG)	66.96	69.22	x	69.22	
16	A	Albert Reynolds (LCA)	66.31	69.10	x	69.10	SB
17	B	Alexander Kiprotich (KEN)	63.55	66.62	68.91	68.91	SB
18	A	Ben Pearson (ENG)	x	66.77	x	66.77	
19	A	Kenechukwu Ezeofor (NGR)	65.71	x	62.59	65.71	
20	A	Orrin Powell (JAM)	60.06	x	61.09	61.09	
21	B	Ikipa Misikea (NIU)	51.68	51.57	48.55	51.68	NR
22	A	Misinia Misikea (NIU)	x	47.95	46.02	47.95	

=== Final ===
Rank	Name	#1	#2	#3	#4	#5	#6	Result	Notes
1st place, gold medalist(s)	Julius Yego (KEN)	79.28	77.66	83.87	–	–	–	83.87	
2nd place, silver medalist(s)	Keshorn Walcott (TTO)	82.13	78.70	x	x	81.59	82.67	82.67	
3rd place, bronze medalist(s)	Hamish Peacock (AUS)	79.34	81.75	77.24	x	75.87	80.24	81.75	
4	Joshua Robinson (AUS)	x	73.37	74.88	79.95	79.53	x	79.95	
5	Stuart Farquhar (NZL)	78.14	x	x	x	x	x	78.14	
6	Rocco van Rooyen (RSA)	69.06	76.84	x	x	x	x	76.84	
7	Luke Cann (AUS)	75.93	x	x	x	x	74.56	75.93	
8	Lee Doran (WAL)	67.97	72.73	x	x	x	x	72.73	
9	John Ampomah (GHA)	69.56	x	67.46				69.56	
10	Leslie Copeland (FIJ)	x	68.16	68.50				68.50	
	Ravinder Singh Khaira (IND)							DNS	
	Vipin Kasana (IND)							DNS	
