= 2024 African Championships in Athletics – Men's javelin throw =

Men's javelin throw at the 2024 African Championships in Athletics
- Venue: Japoma Stadium
- Location: Douala, Cameroon
- Dates: 26 June
- Competitors: 12 from 7 nations
- Winning distance: 80.24 m

Medalists
gold medal	Julius Yego	Kenya
silver medal	Chinecherem Nnamdi	Egypt
bronze medal	Mustafa Mahmoud Abdel Khaliq	South Africa

The men's javelin throw event at the 2024 African Championships in Athletics was held on 26 June in Douala, Cameroon.

== Records ==
Records before the 2024 African Athletics Championships
Record	Athlete (nation)	Distance (m)	Location	Date
World record	Jan Železný (CZE)	98.48	Jena, East Germany	25 May 1986
African record	Julius Yego (KEN)	92.72	Beijing, China	26 August 2015
Championship record	Tom Petranoff (RSA)	87.26	Belle Vue Harel, Mauritius	28 June 1992
World leading	Max Dehning (CAN)	90.20	Halle, Germany	25 February 2024
African leading	Nnamdi Chinecherem (NGR)	82.80	Accra, Ghana	22 March 2024

== Results ==
Rank	Athlete	Nationality	#1	#2	#3	#4	#5	#6	Result	Notes
1st place, gold medalist(s)	Julius Yego	Kenya	71.54	69.80	80.24	77.44	x	79.97	80.24	
2nd place, silver medalist(s)	Chinecherem Nnamdi	Nigeria	75.47	71.49	76.45	74.16	73.90	79.22	79.22	
3rd place, bronze medalist(s)	Mustafa Mahmoud Abdel Khaliq	Egypt	72.97	73.45	77.25	74.15	76.09	65.50	77.25	
4	Rocco van Rooyen	South Africa	71.24	75.21	65.67	72.00	x	72.72	75.21	
5	Samuel Kure Adams	Nigeria	65.68	64.04	65.39	67.70	69.26	68.51	69.26	
6	Jamis Aballa	Ethiopia	65.90	66.42	64.55	69.08	64.67	65.61	69.08	
7	Otag Ubang	Ethiopia	68.75	x	63.36	62.44	68.45	55.90	68.75	
8	Methusellah Kiprop	Kenya	66.08	60.26	62.93	68.75	x	65.49	68.75	
9	Boris Amakai	Cameroon	61.89	62.40	64.01				64.01	
10	Okello Othow	Ethiopia	60.20	62.43	63.65				63.65	
11	Ignace Chancel Ebana	Republic of the Congo	62.34	58.05	x				62.34	
12	Prince Yannick Kibaya	Republic of the Congo	50.10	x	53.90				53.90	

== See also ==
- Athletics at the 2023 African Games – Men's javelin throw
