= Athletics at the 1979 South Pacific Games =

Athletics at the VI South Pacific Games
- Dates: August 29 - September 8
- Host city: Suva, Fiji
- Level: Senior
- Events: 37 (22 men, 15 women)
- Participation: 16 nations

Athletics competitions at the 1979 South Pacific Games were held in Suva, Fiji, between August 29 - September 8, 1979.

A total of 37 events were contested, 22 by men and 15 by women.

== Medal summary ==
Medal winners and their results were published on the Athletics Weekly webpage courtesy of Tony Isaacs and Børre Lilloe, and on the Oceania Athletics Association webpage by Bob Snow.

Complete results can also be found on the Oceania Athletics Association webpage.

=== Men ===
Event	Gold		Silver		Bronze	
100 metres (wind: 0.0 m/s)	Samuela Yavala (FIJ)	10.86	Joseph Wéjièmé (NCL)	10.86	Joseph Leota (SAM)	11.02
200 metres	Joseph Wéjièmé (NCL)	22.12	Patrice Manuel (PYF)	22.47	Inoke Bainimoli (FIJ); Joseph Leota (SAM)	22.52
400 metres	Paiwa Bogela (PNG)	48.73	Hervé Le Strat (PYF)	49.33	Taniela Racule (FIJ)	49.73
800 metres	Ilimotama Daku (FIJ)	1:54.12	Alain Lazare (NCL)	1:55.62	Charlie Oliver (SOL)	1:56.00
1500 metres	Alain Lazare (NCL)	3:54.38	Usaia Sotutu (FIJ)	3:59.97	Ian MacKenzie (PNG)	4:01.29
5000 metres	Alain Lazare (NCL)	14:47.3	Jean-Michel Boulanger (NCL)	15:26.3	Tau John Tokwepota (PNG)	15:28.8
10000 metres	Alain Lazare (NCL)	32:00.9	Shiri Chand (FIJ)	32:21.8	Denis Alcade (NCL)	32:30.1
Marathon	Alain Lazare (NCL)	2:30:57	Batum Makon (PNG)	2:37.48	Tau John Tokwepota (PNG)	2:40:42
3000 metres steeplechase	Alain Lazare (NCL)	9:22.26	Usaia Sotutu (FIJ)	9:28.06	Ian MacKenzie (PNG)	9:36.94
110 metres hurdles	Sakaraia Tuva (FIJ)	15.26	(New Hebrides) Samuela Konataci (NHB)	15.28	Lucien Brillant (PYF)	15.41
400 metres hurdles	Paiwa Bogela (PNG)	53.19	Joe Rodan (FIJ)	54.18	Saimoni Jioji (FIJ)	55.12
High jump	Paul Poaniewa (NCL)	2.21	Clément Poaniewa (NCL)	2.11	Pierre Léontieff-Téahu (PYF)	1.94
Pole vault	Stanley Drollet (PYF)	4.20	Alipeti Latu (TGA)	3.70	Niulolo Prescott (TGA)	3.70
Long jump	Yannick Talon (NCL)	7.02	Armand Welepa (NCL)	7.00	Paul Pirigau (SOL)	6.98
Triple jump	Yannick Talon (NCL)	15.39 w	Piewavagi Waea (PNG)	14.70 w	Noel Mamau (SOL)	14.70 w
Shot put	Jean-Claude Duhaze (PYF)	17.08	Henry Smith (SAM)	15.94	Martial Bone (NCL)	14.50
Discus throw	Jean-Claude Duhaze (PYF)	50.30	Martial Bone (NCL)	48.16	Henry Smith (SAM)	48.14
Hammer throw	Jean-Claude Duhaze (PYF)	53.70	Frédéric Cassier (NCL)	46.38	Martial Bone (NCL)	45.84
Javelin throw	Jean-Paul Lakafia (NCL)	64.44	Folotini Mulilotu (WLF)	63.46	Sosefo Tini (NCL)	62.25
Decathlon	Paul Poaniewa (NCL)	6584	Alipeti Latu (TGA)	6191	Lucien Brillant (PYF)	5778
4 x 100 metres relay	Fiji; Penasio Cerecere; Joe Rodan; Samuela Yavala; Inoke Bainimoli	41.86	French Polynesia; Yvon Allain; Errol Ferriol; Hervé Le Strat; Patrice Manuel	42.30	Western Samoa; William Fong; Simanu Simi; Joseph Keil; Joe Leota	42.83
4 x 400 metres relay	Fiji; Taniela Racule; Mosese Waqanibete; Joe Logavatu; Ilimo Daku	3:16.94	Papua New Guinea; Wavala Kali; Tony Aiam; Janos Suagotsu; Paiwa Bogela	3:18.36	Solomon Islands; Geoffrey Nimanima; Aaron Hitu; Frank Hana; John Waokahi	3:19.35

=== Women ===
Event	Gold		Silver		Bronze	
100 metres (wind: -1.6 m/s)	Brigitte Hardel (NCL)	12.07	Miriama Chambault (FIJ)	12.37	Naomi Polum (PNG)	12.40
200 metres (wind: -1.2 m/s)	Brigitte Hardel (NCL)	24.68	Naomi Polum (PNG)	25.07	Odile Mevin (NCL)	25.30
400 metres	Brigitte Hardel (NCL)	57.02	Alena Waqasiwa (FIJ)	58.51	Liku Galala (FIJ)	59.37
800 metres	Make Liku (FIJ)	2:22.15	Janice Jiroru (PNG)	2:22.74	Gisung Ngalau (PNG)	2:22.85
1500 metres	Christele Barthelemy (NCL)	4:49.04	Rusila Radinibeqa (FIJ)	4:51.39	Janice Jiroru (PNG)	4:53.54
3000 metres	Betty Boppart (GUM)	10:27.76	Christele Barthelemy (NCL)	10:48.12	Alakoromaki Matepi (COK)	11:06.03
100 metres hurdles (wind: -1.9 m/s)	Miriama Chambault (FIJ)	14.80	Brigitte Hardel (NCL)	14.91	(New Hebrides) Leitaou Essaou (NHB)	15.68
High jump	Danièle Guyonnet (PYF)	1.75	(New Hebrides) Loain Pierrez (NHB)	1.58	Denise Kacirek (NCL)	1.58
Long jump	Miriama Chambault (FIJ)	5.76 w	Brigitte Hardel (NCL)	5.60 w	Laurence Napoleon (NCL)	5.29
Shot put	Marie-Christine Sealeu (NCL)	13.08	Magali Teahui (PYF)	12.03	Danièle Guyonnet (PYF)	11.90
Discus throw	Marie-Christine Sealeu (NCL)	45.78	Sandra Bordes (PYF)	39.46	Vinaina Drauniniu (FIJ)	38.92
Javelin throw	Mereoni Vibose (FIJ)	46.94	Georgette Paouro (NCL)	45.48	Monika Fiafialoto (WLF)	43.96
Pentathlon	Danièle Guyonnet (PYF)	3625	Miriama Chambault (FIJ)	3323	(New Hebrides) Jeanne Liliord (NHB)	3022
4 x 100 metres relay	New Caledonia; Odile Mevin; Cathy Farrugia; Laurence Napoleon; Brigitte Hardel	48.19	Fiji; Emmaline Bennion; Anaseini Uate; Weapi Gusuivalu; Sainiana Tukana	49.35	New Hebrides; Laitaou Essaou; Anna Lemus; Nesbeth Meta; Maya Leeman	49.43
4 x 400 metres relay	Fiji; Anaseini Uate; Alena Waqasiwa; Liku Galala; Make Liku	3:57.97	New Caledonia; Graziella Moutry; Karen Parage; Odile Mevin; Brigitte Hardel	4:01.67	Papua New Guinea; Gisung Ngalau; Linda Marere; Naomi Polum; Janice Jiroru	4:03.01

== Medal table (unofficial) ==
* Host nation (Fiji)

Rank	Nation	Gold	Silver	Bronze	Total
1	New Caledonia	20	14	7	41
2	Fiji*	8	7	5	20
3	French Polynesia	6	5	4	15
4	Papua New Guinea	2	5	8	15
5	Guam	1	0	0	1
6	New Hebrides	0	2	3	5
7	Tonga	0	2	1	3
8	Western Samoa	0	1	3	4
9	Wallis and Futuna	0	1	1	2
10	Solomon Islands	0	0	4	4
11	Cook Islands	0	0	1	1
Totals (11 entries)		37	37	37	111

== Participation (unofficial) ==
Athletes from the following 16 countries were reported to participate:

- American Samoa
- Cook Islands
- Fiji
- French Polynesia
- Guam
- Kiribati
- New Caledonia
- New Hebrides
- Niue
- Norfolk Island
- Northern Mariana Islands
- Papua New Guinea
- Solomon Islands
- Tonga
- Wallis and Futuna
- Western Samoa
