= Henry Smith (discus thrower) =

New Zealand-Samoan athlete (1955–2020)

Personal information
- Nationality: Samoan
- Born: 16 March 1955 Wellington, New Zealand
- Died: 14 March 2020 (aged 64) Wellington, New Zealand

Sport
- Sport: Athletics
- Event(s): Discus; Shot put
- Club: Titahi Bay
Medal record
Men's Athletics
Representing New Zealand
South Pacific Games
| Silver medal – second place | 1979 Suva | Shot put |
| Bronze medal – third place | 1979 Suva | Discus |
| Gold medal – first place | 1983 Apia | Discus |
| Silver medal – second place | 1983 Apia | Shot put |

Henry Smith (16 March 1955 – 14 March 2020) was a New Zealand-Samoan athlete. He competed in the men's discus throw at the 1984 Summer Olympics and the 1988 Summer Olympics.
