= Barbara Ingiro =

Papua New Guinean athlete

Personal information
- Nationality: Papua New Guinean
- Born: 6 December 1962 (age 63)

Sport
- Sport: Sprinting
- Event: 100 metres
Medal record
Women's Athletics
Representing Papua New Guinea
Pacific Games
Gold medal – first place	1983 Apia	4 × 400 m relay
Silver medal – second place	1983 Apia	4 × 100 m relay
Bronze medal – third place	1983 Apia	100 m
Bronze medal – third place	1983 Apia	200 m
Pacific Mini Games
Gold medal – first place	1981 Honiara	4 × 400 m relay

Barbara Ingiro-Sapea (born 6 December 1962) is a Papua New Guinean former sprinter. She competed in the women's 100 metres at the 1984 Summer Olympics.
