= Moustafa Mahmoud (javelin thrower) =

Egyptian athlete (born 2001)

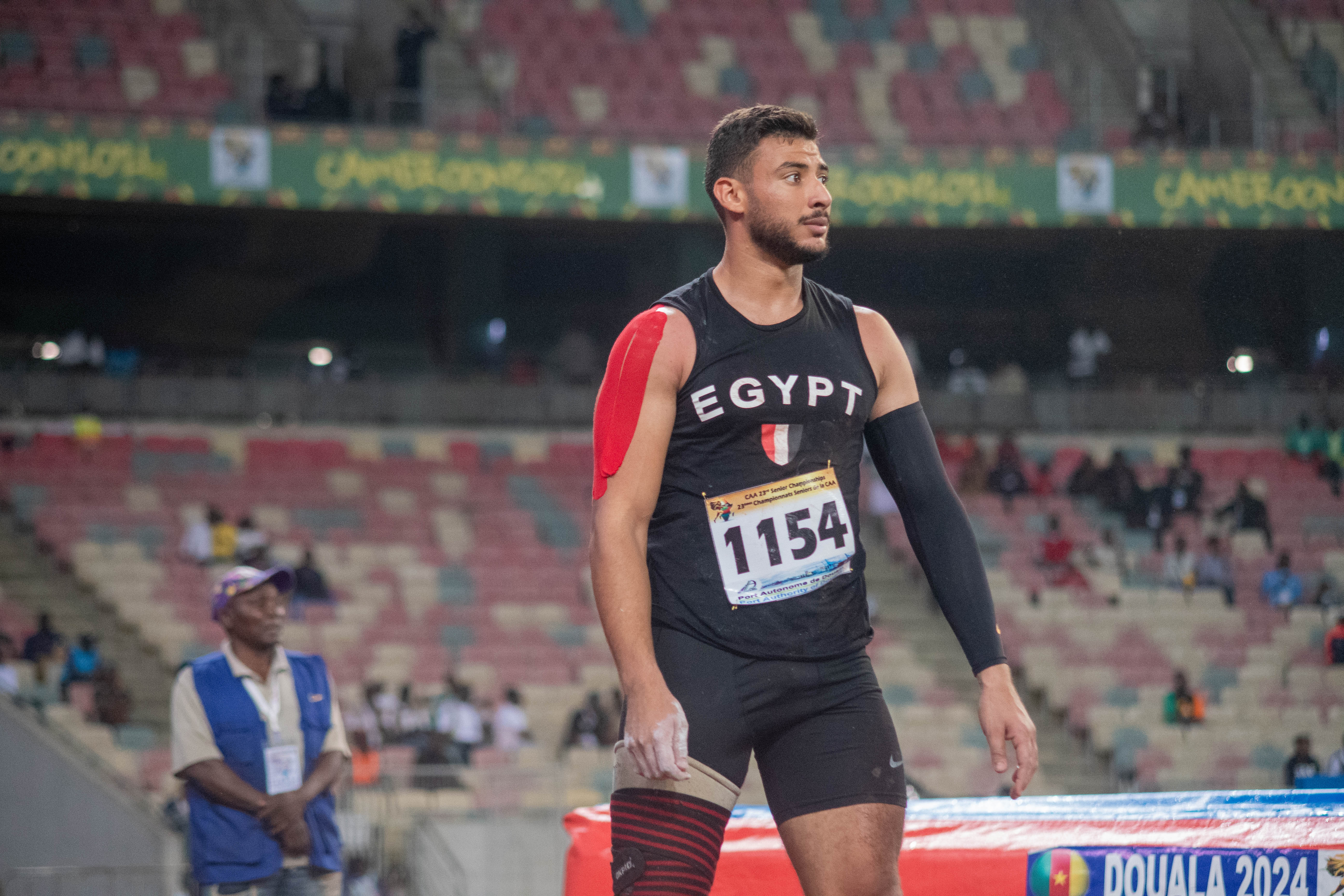
- Mahmoud in 2024

Personal information
- Born: 22 September 2001 (age 24)

Sport
- Sport: Athletics
- Event: Javelin throw

Achievements and titles
- Personal best: Javelin: 81.92m (2024)
Medal record
Men's athletics
Representing Egypt
African Games
Bronze medal – third place	2023 Accra	Javelin throw
African Championships
Bronze medal – third place	2024 Douala	Javelin throw

Moustafa Mahmoud (born 22 September 2001) is an Egyptian javelin thrower. He became national champion in 2023 and competed at the 2024 Olympic Games.

== Career ==
He became Egyptian javelin champion in July 2023. He was a bronze medalist at the 2023 African Games in Accra, Ghana with a throw of 78.10 metres.

He threw a personal best distance of 81.92 metres in Dessau, Germany in May 2024. He was a bronze medalist at the 2024 African Championships in Athletics in Douala, Cameroon with a throw of 77.25 metres.

He competed in the javelin at the 2024 Summer Olympics in Paris in August 2024.
