= Rocco van Rooyen =

South African javelin thrower

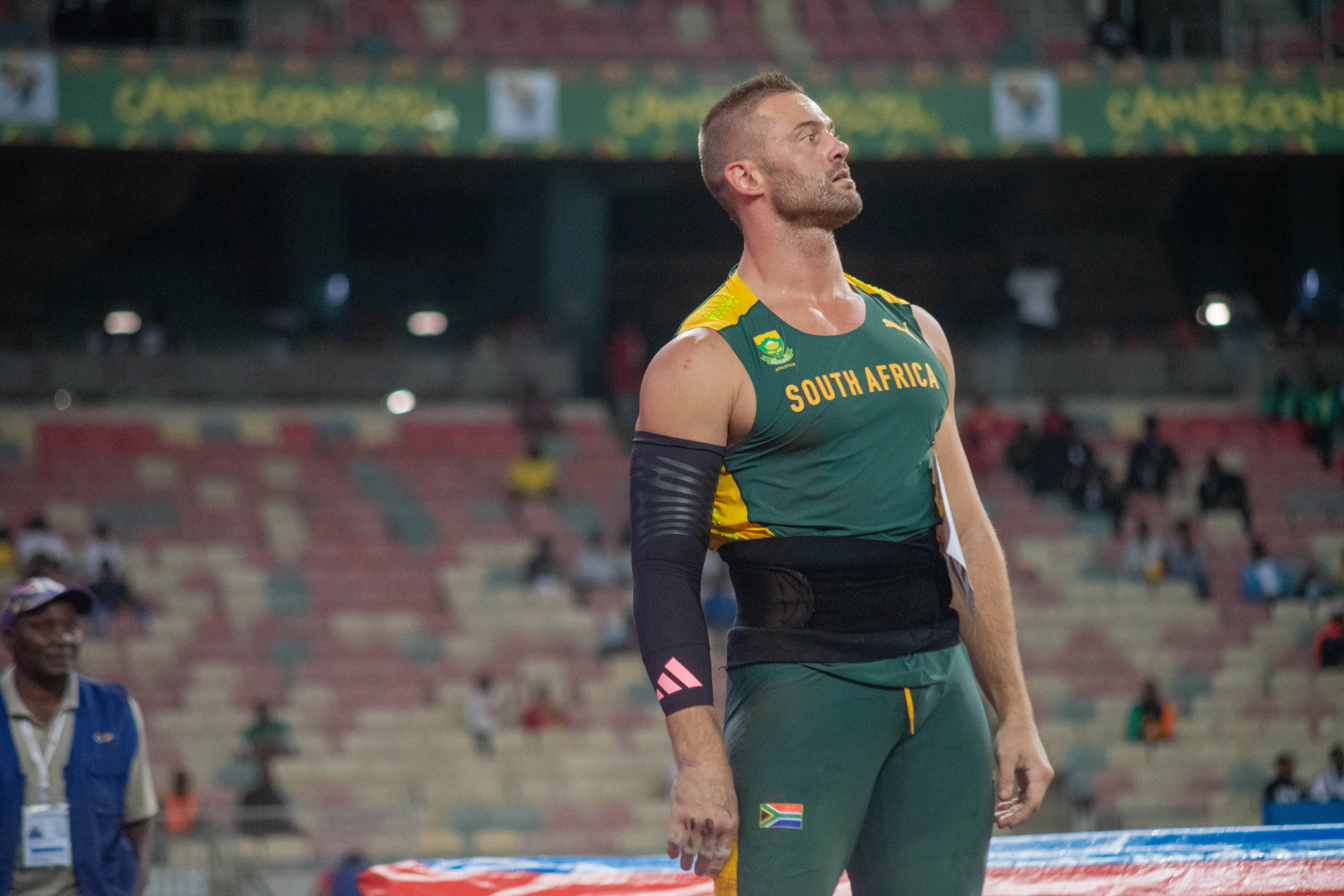

Personal information
- Born: 23 December 1992 (age 33) Bellville, Western Cape, South Africa

Sport
- Country: South Africa
- Sport: Track and field
- Event: Javelin throw
- Updated on 29 August 2015

Rocco van Rooyen (born 23 December 1992) is a South African athlete specialising in the javelin throw. He competed at the 2015 World Championships in Beijing without qualifying for the final.

He competed in the men's javelin throw at the 2020 Summer Olympics.

His personal best in the event is 85.97 metres, set in Cape Town in 2021.

== Competition record ==
Year	Competition	Venue	Position	Event	Notes
Representing South Africa
2010	World Junior Championships	Moncton, Canada	6th	Javelin throw	74.13 m
2011	African Junior Championships	Gaborone, Botswana	1st	Javelin throw	75.72 m
2015	Commonwealth Games	Glasgow, United Kingdom	6th	Javelin throw	76.84 m
2015	African Championships	Marrakesh, Morocco	6th	Javelin throw	75.41 m
2015	World Championships	Beijing, China	28th (q)	Javelin throw	75.55 m
2016	Olympic Games	Rio de Janeiro, Brazil	24th (q)	Javelin throw	78.48 m
2017	World Championships	London, United Kingdom	30th (q)	Javelin throw	74.02 m
2021	Olympic Games	Tokyo, Japan	23rd (q)	Javelin throw	77.41 m
2024	African Championships	Douala, Cameroon	4th	Javelin throw	75.21 m

== Seasonal bests by year ==
- 2009 – 67.40
- 2010 – 74.13
- 2011 – 75.72
- 2012 – 71.36
- 2013 – 72.66
- 2014 – 80.10
- 2015 – 85.39
- 2016 – 78.48
- 2017 – 84.09
- 2018 – 75.20
- 2019 – 77.82
- 2020 – 85.80
- 2021 – 85.97
- 2022 – 77.34

== Other appearances ==
Rocco van Rooyen was a contestant on Survivor South Africa: Island of Secrets, which premiered on 16 May 2019. Rocco was the seventh person voted out of the season.
