= Nnamdi Chinecherem =

Nigerian athlete (born 2002)

Nnamdi Chinecherem Prosper also known as Nnamdi Zaza
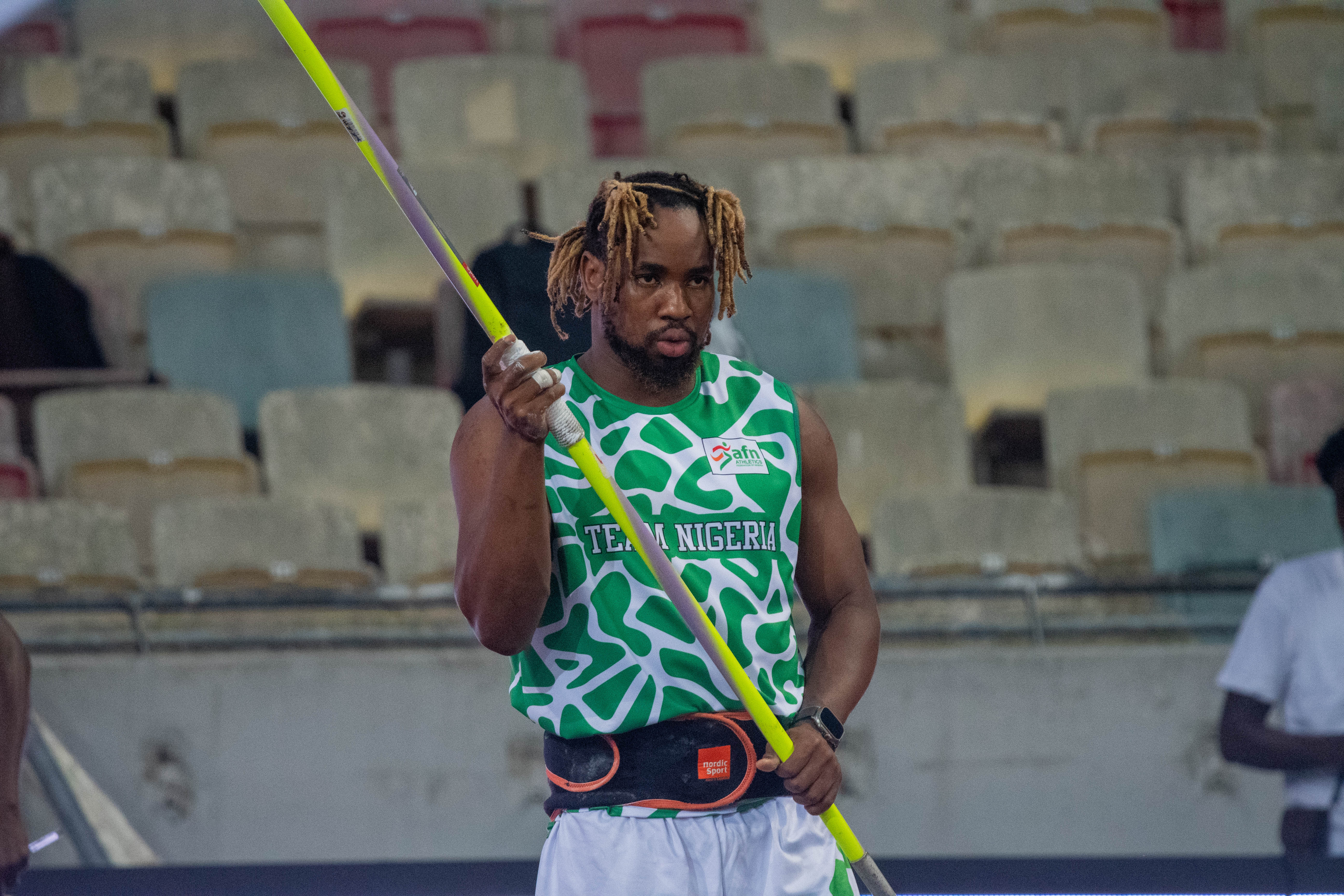

Personal information
- Born: 12 July 2002 (age 24) Nnewi, Anambra State, Nigeria

Sport
- Sport: Javelin
Medal record
Men's athletics
Representing Nigeria
African Games
| Gold medal – first place | 2023 Accra | Javelin throw |
African Championships
| Silver medal – second place | 2024 Douala | Javelin throw |
World U20 Championships
| Bronze medal – third place | 2021 Nairobi | Javelin throw |

Nnamdi Chinecherem Prosper (born 12 July 2002) is a Nigerian javelin athlete.

== Career ==
In 2021, Chinecherem won the bronze medal in the men's javelin throw event at the 2021 World Athletics U20 Championships in Nairobi Kenya.

This record made him the first Nigerian athlete to win an award at a field medal since the last championship where Esther Aghatise won a medal in 2002.

Nnamdi competed for the Baylor Bears track and field team in the NCAA.

In 2022, he made up the list of athletics from Nigeria selected for the 2022 Commonwealth Games in Birmingham, England.

He was one of the flagbearer alongside Folashade Oluwafemiayo during the opening ceremony of the Commonwealth Games.
