= Survivor South Africa: Island of Secrets =

- Season 7
- Presented by: Nico Panagio
- No. of days: 39
- No. of castaways: 21
- Winner: Robert "Rob" Bentele
- Runner-up: Nicole Capper
- Location: Samoa
- No. of episodes: 18

Release
- Original network: M-Net
- Original release: 16 May – 12 September 2019

Additional information
- Filming dates: 4 February – 14 March 2019

Season chronology
- ← Previous; Philippines Next → Immunity Island

Survivor South Africa: Island of Secrets is the seventh season of the South African reality competition show, Survivor South Africa. This season was announced during the season finale of the previous season, Survivor South Africa: Philippines, on 18 August 2018, and applications to compete were accepted until 30 September 2018. The season was filmed in Samoa over 39 days from January to March 2019, and began airing on M-Net on 16 May 2019. The season concluded with a live finale and reunion on September 12, 2019, when Robert "Rob" Bentele was crowned Sole Survivor over Nicole Capper and Durão Mariano by a vote of 6-4-0 respectively. It was the fifth season hosted by Nico Panagio, and was produced by Afrokaans Film & Television.

== The Island of Secrets ==
This season features the titular Island of Secrets, a secluded island where castaways were exiled for short periods. Exiled castaways were given decisions that would net them potential advantages or disadvantages during their time spent away from their tribes, similarly to Ghost Island from the 36th American season, Survivor: Ghost Island. With 21 players (11 men and 10 women), this is the third Survivor South Africa season to feature a gender imbalance, following Santa Carolina and Maldives.

== Contestants ==
The 21 contestants were initially divided into three tribes — Laumei, Sa'ula, and Ta'alo — with seven castaways each. On Day 8, with 18 players remaining, the players were redistributed into three tribes of six by random draw, with a previously exiled castaway earning the right to choose their new tribe. On Day 15, with 15 players remaining, the players were redistributed into two tribes of seven, with the leftover castaway being exiled to the Island of Secrets until the next Tribal Council, where they joined the attending tribe. On Day 20, the 13 remaining players formed the Manumalo tribe, named after the Samoan word for "win".

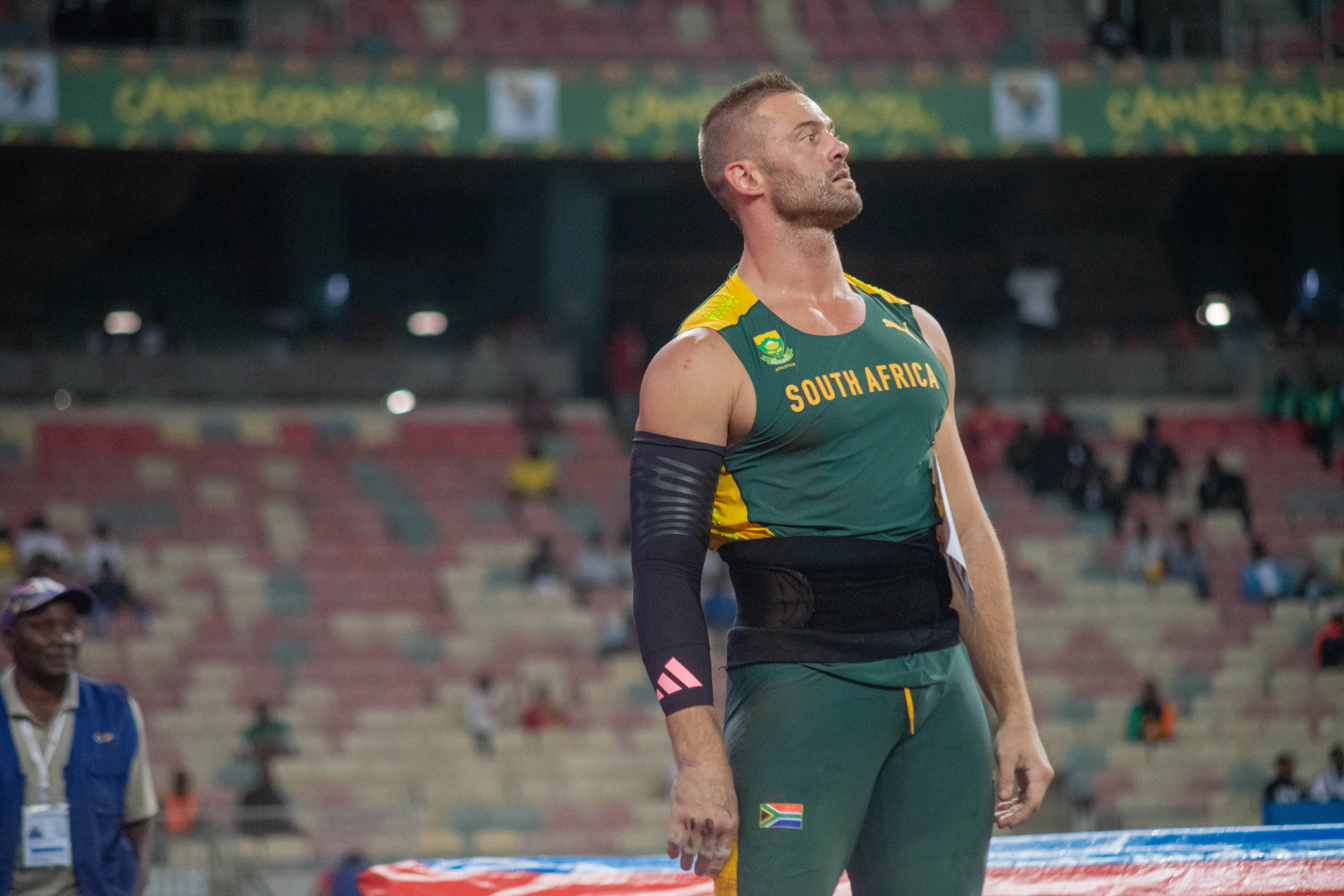
Rocco van Rooyen

List of Survivor South Africa: Island of Secrets contestants
Contestant	Original tribe	First switched tribe	Second switched tribe	Merged tribe	Finish
Lee-Anne van Renen; 33, Durbanville, Western Cape	Sa'ula				1st voted out Day 3
Paul Smulders; 54, Roodepoort, Gauteng	Sa'ula				2nd voted out Day 5
Ai-Ting "Ting Ting" Wong; 25, Durban, Kwa Zulu Natal	Ta'alo				3rd voted out Day 7
Rose-Lee Smith; 33, Johannesburg, Gauteng	Laumei	Laumei			4th voted out Day 9
Felix Godlo; 29, Pretoria, Gauteng	Ta'alo	Laumei			5th voted out Day 12
Tania Copeland; 51, Somerset West, Western Cape	Ta'alo	Laumei			6th voted out Day 14
Rocco van Rooyen; 26, Cape Town, Western Cape	Laumei	Ta'alo	Ta'alo		7th voted out Day 16
Nathan Castle; 25, Cape Town, Western Cape	Sa'ula	Sa'ula	Sa'ula		8th voted out Day 19
Meryl Szolkiewicz; 31, Irene, Gauteng	Ta'alo	Ta'alo	Sa'ula	Manumalo	9th voted out 1st jury member Day 22
Geoffrey Cooke-Tonnesen; 33, Colenso, Kwa Zulu Natal	Laumei	Sa'ula	Sa'ula	Manumalo	10th voted out 2nd jury member Day 24
Seipei Mashugane; 40, Soweto, Gauteng	Sa'ula	Laumei	Ta'alo	Manumalo	11th voted out 3rd jury member Day 26
Danté de Villiers; 31, Dwarskersbos, Western Cape	Ta'alo	Ta'alo	Sa'ula	Manumalo	12th voted out 4th jury member Day 28
Cobus Hugo; 27, Cape Town, Western Cape	Ta'alo	Sa'ula	Ta'alo	Manumalo	13th voted out 5th jury member Day 30
Mmabatlokoa "Mmaba" Molefe; 28, Cape Town, Western Cape	Laumei	Sa'ula	Sa'ula	Manumalo	14th voted out 6th jury member Day 32
Jacques Burger; 27, Pretoria, Gauteng	Ta'alo	Laumei	Ta'alo	Manumalo	15th voted out 7th jury member Day 34
Mike Venter; 21, Boksburg, Gauteng	Laumei	Sa'ula	Ta'alo	Manumalo	16th voted out 8th jury member Day 35
Steffi Brink; 27, Midrand, Gauteng	Sa'ula	Sa'ula	Ta'alo (Note: Steffi was initially exiled after not picking a tribe coloured paint during the second tribe switch. She joined the tribe that lost the next Immunity Challenge, Ta'alo, directly after their Tribal Council.)	Manumalo	Eliminated (Note: After all other remaining castaways became immune — Rob by winning the immunity challenge; and Durão, Laetitia and Nicole by playing hidden immunity idols;— Steffi was eliminated by default.); 9th jury member Day 37
Laetitia le Roux; 58, Randburg, Gauteng	Laumei	Ta'alo	Ta'alo	Manumalo	17th voted out 10th jury member Day 38
Durão Mariano; 28, Durban, Kwa Zulu Natal	Laumei	Laumei	Sa'ula	Manumalo	2nd runner-up
Nicole Capper; 33, Fourways, Gauteng	Sa'ula	Ta'alo	Sa'ula	Manumalo	Runner-up
Rob Bentele; 28, Richards Bay, Kwa Zulu Natal	Sa'ula	Ta'alo	Ta'alo	Manumalo	Sole Survivor

=== Future appearances ===
Danté de Villiers, Felix Godlo, Meryl Szolkiewicz, Steffi Brink and Tania Copeland competed again in Survivor South Africa: Return of the Outcasts in 2022. Rob Bentele would compete on Survivor again, representing South Africa on Australian Survivor: Australia V The World in 2025 where he was the first person voted out.

== Season summary ==
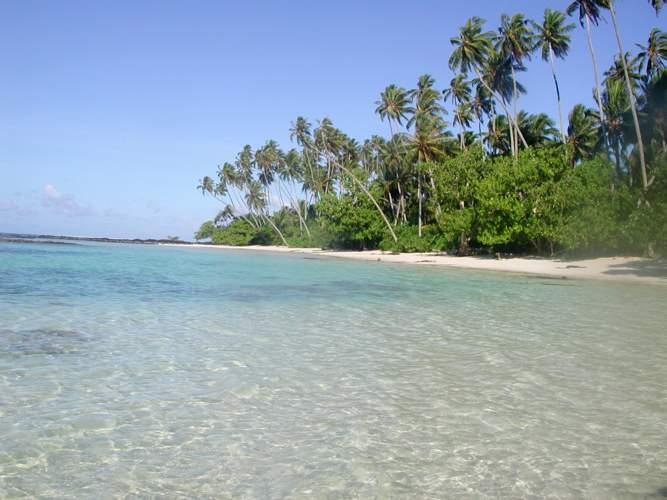
The season filmed in Upolu in Samoa.

The game began with three tribes of seven: Laumei, Sa’ula, and Ta’alo. Sa’ula lost the first two immunity challenges, but an alliance called the Amigos formed between Nathan, Nicole, Rob and Steffi, while fractures in both Laumei and Ta'alo began to form. After a strategic blunder by Jacques at Ta'alo's first Tribal Council, a tribe shuffle on Day 8 saw a new Laumei tribe struggle as Jacques formed a Band of Misfits alliance with original Laumei member Durão and fifth Amigo Seipei. A second tribe shuffle on Day 15 led to the formation of a majority alliance called the Spit-Shakers, seven castaways consisting of a blend of all three original tribes that outnumbered the third Sa'ula tribe.

The last Tribal Council before the merge saw Nicole betraying Nathan due to a recurring injury he sustained at the beginning of the game, but she managed to reunite with the Amigos and side with the Spit-Shakers to systematically eliminate the newer Sa'ula outsiders. The Amigos' plans changed when Seipei suggested to Rob about turning against Nicole and Steffi at the Final 8 with her Band of Misfits. Using a new bond he made with Durão, Rob united the Amigos and remaining Laumei players to take down the remaining loyal Spit-Shakers. Jacques managed to outwit the Amigos' haphazard plans with his hidden immunity idol, but he eventually fell victim to a scornful isolation led by the Amigos until he had no option other than to play his idol; he was sent to the jury shortly after.

The Final Six saw the Amigos with Laetitia, an original Laumei who was dismissed for her age in the beginning of the game, temporarily align to try and get rid of the two remaining Laumei men (Durão and Mike), before they could blindside Rob. However, the three women started to take on the earlier attempts of a women's alliance to take Rob down instead. Rob's back-to-back immunity wins saw an end to the women's plans, with Nicole running to Rob to make a scapegoat out of Steffi and break up the Amigos. With Nicole's true colours revealed, Laetitia tried to fight for a spot in the Final Three, but to no avail. The Final Tribal Council saw the jury berate Rob and Nicole for their malicious methods in executing an almost flawless game, and dismissed Durão as a tool for Rob's strategic game. In the end, the jury respected Rob's active strategic dominance leading the Amigos and the merge over Nicole's cutthroat betrayals and unwavering loyalty to Rob, and awarded him the victory and title of Sole Survivor.

Challenge winners and eliminations by episode
Episode			Challenge winner(s)		Island of Secrets			Eliminated	Finish
No.	Title (Note: The Titles for the Episodes relate to titling on 10 Play in Australia.)	Air date	Reward	Immunity	Exiled	Scenario	Result	Eliminated	Finish
1	"I Just Want to Fix Your Crown"	May 16, 2019	None (Note: Each tribe earned items for their survival; there was no designated winner.)	Ta'alo	Cobus	Temptation	Taken	Lee-Anne	1st voted out Day 3
1	"I Just Want to Fix Your Crown"	May 16, 2019	None	Ta'alo	Paul	Temptation	Taken	Lee-Anne	1st voted out Day 3
1	"I Just Want to Fix Your Crown"	May 16, 2019	None	Laumei	Paul	Temptation	Taken	Lee-Anne	1st voted out Day 3
1	"I Just Want to Fix Your Crown"	May 16, 2019	None	Laumei	Rocco	Temptation	Refused	Lee-Anne	1st voted out Day 3
2	"One Step Forward, Two Steps Back"	May 23, 2019	Laumei (Note: Combined reward and immunity challenge.)		Rob	Game of chance	Lost	Paul	2nd voted out Day 5
2	"One Step Forward, Two Steps Back"	May 23, 2019	Ta'alo	Ta'alo (Note: The tribes that did not win the first challenge competed in the second challenge for the second immunity idol.)	Rob	Game of chance	Lost	Paul	2nd voted out Day 5
3	"The Gods Have Smiled Upon Me"	May 30, 2019	Sa'ula		Tania (Note: This castaway was exiled until after the next Tribal Council, which meant they could not be voted out or participate in the vote.)	Temptation	Taken	Ting Ting	3rd voted out Day 7
3	"The Gods Have Smiled Upon Me"	May 30, 2019	Laumei		Tania	Temptation	Taken	Ting Ting	3rd voted out Day 7
4	"I'm Not Gonna Buy This B.S."	June 6, 2019	Ta'alo		Seipei	Exile		Rose-Lee	4th voted out Day 9
4	"I'm Not Gonna Buy This B.S."	June 6, 2019	Sa'ula		Seipei	Exile		Rose-Lee	4th voted out Day 9
5	"It's Time for a Hail Mary"	June 13, 2019	Ta'alo	Ta'alo	Geoffrey	Temptation	Taken	Felix	5th voted out Day 12
5	"It's Time for a Hail Mary"	June 13, 2019	Laumei	Sa'ula	Geoffrey	Temptation	Taken	Felix	5th voted out Day 12
6	"Let Them Play Barbie and Ken"	June 20, 2019	Laumei	Sa'ula	Nathan	Advantage		Tania	6th voted out Day 14
6	"Let Them Play Barbie and Ken"	June 20, 2019	Laumei	Ta'alo	Nicole	Advantage		Tania	6th voted out Day 14
7	"The Game Chooses for You"	June 27, 2019	Ta'alo	Sa'ula	Steffi (Note: Steffi picked the bowl without paint during the second tribe switch. As a result, she was exiled and joined the tribe that lost the next Immunity Challenge, Ta'alo, directly after their Tribal Council.)	Exile		Rocco	7th voted out Day 16
8	"Putting My Foot in My Mouth"	July 4, 2019	Ta'alo	Ta'alo	Durão	Advantage		Nathan	8th voted out Day 19
9	"Are You Crying?"	July 11, 2019	None (Note: There was no reward challenge due to the merge.)	Steffi	Steffi	Exile		Meryl	9th voted out 1st jury member Day 22
10	"He's Delicious-Looking..."	July 18, 2019	Danté, Durão, Geoffrey, Mmaba	Rob	Jacques	Advantage		Geoffrey	10th voted out 2nd jury member Day 24
11	"The Puppetmaster"	July 25, 2019	Danté, Jacques, Mike		Cobus (Note: The two castaways who did not compete in the Immunity Challenge participated in a separate immunity duel at the Island of Secrets. The winner of the duel was also immune at the next Tribal Council.)	Immunity; Duel	Won	Seipei	11th voted out 3rd jury member Day 26
11	"The Puppetmaster"	July 25, 2019	Danté, Jacques, Mike		Nicole	Immunity; Duel	Lost	Seipei	11th voted out 3rd jury member Day 26
12	"One Trick Pony"	August 1, 2019	Danté, [Laetitia, Mike, Mmaba]	Durão	Durão	Temptation	Taken	Danté	12th voted out 4th jury member Day 28
13	"Trouble Council"	August 8, 2019	Nicole, Rob, Steffi		Rob	Advantage		Cobus	13th voted out 5th jury member Day 30
13	"Trouble Council"	August 8, 2019	Rob		Rob	Advantage		Cobus	13th voted out 5th jury member Day 30
14	"The Biggest Mother-"	August 15, 2019	Mmaba (Note: The two castaways exiled to the Island of Secrets were given a feast and competed for an advantage. Mmaba beat Steffi for the advantage.)	Nicole	Mmaba	Reward Duel	Won	Mmaba	14th voted out 6th jury member Day 32
14	"The Biggest Mother-"	August 15, 2019	Mmaba	Nicole	Steffi	Reward Duel	Lost	Mmaba	14th voted out 6th jury member Day 32
15	"The Lightbulbs Are Switching On"	August 22, 2019	Yankee; Swap; Game	Mike	Steffi	Reward		Jacques	15th voted out 7th jury member Day 34
16	"Someone You Can Trust"	August 29, 2019	Rob, [Laetitia, Steffi]		Durão, Mike, Nicole	Exile		Mike	16th voted out 8th jury member Day 35
17	"Icarus"	September 5, 2019	Rob, [Nicole]	Rob	Laetitia	Advantage		Steffi	Eliminated (Note: After all other remaining castaways became immune — Rob by winning the immunity challenge; and Durão, Laetitia and Nicole by playing hidden immunity idols;— Steffi was eliminated by default.); 9th jury member Day 37
18	"Action Speaks Louder" and Live Reunion	September 12, 2019	None	Rob	None			Laetitia	17th voted out 10th jury member Day 38
18	"Action Speaks Louder" and Live Reunion	September 12, 2019						Jury vote	
18	"Action Speaks Louder" and Live Reunion	September 12, 2019						Durão	2nd Runner-up; Day 39
18	"Action Speaks Louder" and Live Reunion	September 12, 2019						Nicole	Runner-up; Day 39
18	"Action Speaks Louder" and Live Reunion	September 12, 2019						Rob	Sole Survivor; Day 39

In the case of multiple tribes or castaways who win reward or immunity, they are listed in order of finish, or alphabetically where it was a team effort; where one castaway won and invited others, the invitees are in brackets.

== Episodes ==
No. overall	No. in season	Title	Timeline	Original release date
90	1	"I Just Want to Fix Your Crown"	Days 1-3	May 16, 2019
The three tribes were tasked to designate a tribe leader. Cobus, Paul, and Rocco were chosen for Ta'alo, Sa'ula, and Laumei respectively. The leaders had to pick their tribe's weakest player (Jacques, Seipei, and Laetitia were respectively chosen). However, the three leaders were informed they were being exiled to the Island of Secrets for the first night of the game immediately, while their tribe's weakest players were assigned to crucial roles for the reward challenge. Once at the Island of Secrets, the three leaders were given tribal dilemmas: a clue to a hidden immunity idol at their camps, or flint. While Rocco was the only one to choose flint for his tribe, he dug through Paul's jeans to have a look at the hidden immunity idol clue when he was alone.: Reward Challenge: The weakest players are placed upon a tower structure, with two pairs of blindfolded tribemates to give directions. The tribes have five minutes to collect items at stations across a field amidst obstacles and pulley their items up to their tribe's caller. Any items not up on the tower at the end of the challenge does not go to the tribes' camps.; From on top of Ta'alo's tower in the reward challenge, Jacques spotted a singular bag of rice at the end of the field with an advantage in it, directing his tribemates to collect the advantage for him without them knowing. The advantage gave Jacques an extra vote for the first Tribal Council at the merge (while unmentioned in the show, the full write-up of the advantage outlined that his extra vote operated similar to the "Legacy Advantage" featured in Survivor US - in that should the holder of the advantage be eliminated, they will pass it on to a player still in the game). Tania started leading the tribe in building the shelter, but she came across as erratic and left tasks unfinished for others to do instead. Over at Sa'ula, Seipei's leadership in building the tribe's shelter came across as bossy to the rest of the tribe. Meanwhile, an alliance between Nathan, Nicole, Rob, and Steffi started to form, calling themselves the Amigos. The Amigos decided to bring in Paul as a fifth to take control of Sa'ula. Laetitia started searching for an idol immediately around the Laumei camp, aware of her age making her a target as an early boot. When the leaders returned to their tribes, Tania immediately pulled Cobus aside to arrange a majority alliance, but her assertiveness was pushing away Cobus and Ting Ting from considering her as a potential ally. Rocco roped in the Laumei men and shared the clue he read in the hopes of orchestrating an all-guys alliance, but Mike and Geoffrey were skeptical after considering their options. Paul shared the idol clue with the entire Sa'ula tribe, where the Amigos found the idol hidden under their tribe's well in front of Lee-Anne.: Immunity Challenge: The tribes start on a floating platform in the ocean with a 3D puzzle to deconstruct and carry to the beach. While swimming to shore, they must traverse over a three-part obstacle course over the water. Once all tribe members have their puzzle pieces on their tribe stations, they must rebuild their puzzle to how it was on the floating platform. The first two tribes to complete their puzzle on land would receive immunity.; Ta'alo overtook Laumei halfway through the obstacle course and completed their puzzle first, with Laumei catching up at the puzzle and finishing second. Sa'ula lagged behind for most of the challenge until the puzzle. Nathan injured his ankle during the immunity challenge, but the Amigos assured him that he was staying, trusting him with the tribe's idol. Seipei approached Nathan and campaigned for the Amigos to target Lee-Anne over herself, pointing out that Lee-Anne was struggling socially around camp, while she had more to offer in challenges. Lee-Anne and Nicole arrived in the game with prior history as competing beauty queens in Mrs. South Africa, with Lee-Anne being intimidating by the former Mrs. South Africa. She tried to explain herself to Steffi and Nicole, but the Amigos made it known that Lee-Anne's efforts were a bit late. At Tribal Council, the Sa'ula tribe claimed they were still undecided on whom to vote out, but Nathan's adamant whispering during tribal in defense of Seipei saw Lee-Anne's fate sealed with the Amigos, sending the beauty queen home.
91	2	"One Step Forward, Two Steps Back"	Days 4-5	May 23, 2019
Paul approached Nicole after Sa'ula's first Tribal Council with concerns about a sub-alliance forming within the Amigos, suggesting that Nicole, Steffi, and himself align first. Cobus shared his idol clue with Jacques in the early morning, and the two started looking by their tribe's well. Jacques found the hidden immunity idol from under Cobus' nose and hid it with his secret advantage. Meanwhile Ta'alo's patience with Tania was wearing thin, as Felix and Tania clashed during the rain for space in the shelter. Rocco tried to lead the Laumei men to consider voting out Mmaba at the first opportunity, while Mike and Geoffrey initially targeted Laetitia for her age. However, once they noticed that Rocco was defending Laetitia, Mike rallied Geoffrey, Mmaba, and Rose-Lee against Rocco.: Reward/Immunity Challenge: Each tribe carried a large net full of coconuts that were attached to one tribe member acting as a retriever. The retriever must find balls and stacking cups using a carrying fork, which surrounded the structure which their tribe is carrying the coconut nets. The first tribe to collect their stacking cups and balls, and complete their tower won either chickens or fishing gear, and immunity, and the second tribe receives the other reward.; On top of winning the reward and immunity, Laumei were given the opportunity to send one castaway from Sa'ula, the losing tribe, to the Island of Secrets for the night. They elected Rob over Steffi, as the physically strongest Sa'ula player. At the Island of Secrets, Rob was offered a game of chance. If he won, he could send anyone including himself to the Island of Secrets up until the merge; but if he lost, he would have to forfeit his vote at the next Tribal Council. Rob decided to play, but he lost his vote. Morale at Sa'ula dropped after their second challenge loss, with Steffi blaming herself as the retriever. The Ta'alo members were concerned about the possibility that the immunity challenge against Sa'ula would be more physical than they would like.: Immunity Challenge: Facing off two on two, the tribes would try to retrieve a ring and return with it to their starting pole. The tribe would score a point when one of their members had one hand on the ring and one hand on the flag pole. The first tribe to score three points would win immunity.; During the immunity challenge, Nathan's ankle injury was aggravated, and the medical team stepped in at his request to pull him out of the challenge. Danté and Felix on the other hand, dominated the challenge for Ta'alo, with only Steffi being able to score a point for Sa'ula before the challenge was lost. The Amigos were devastated about the fact that Nathan was the obvious choice to vote out due to his ankle injury, instead of Seipei. Steffi and Nicole spoke to everyone one by one about having to vote out Nathan. However, when Paul was discussing with the two women about aligning with them, his demeanor changed from when he was talking with Nicole previously. Nathan, concerned he was dragging his ally down with him, told Rob to stop carrying him in the game. At Tribal Council, Nathan's injury was brought up as a concern for future challenges and that building a strong tribe going forward was necessary. However, alliance trust over injuries triumphed, with Nicole and the Amigos blindsiding Paul.
92	3	"The Gods Have Smiled Upon Me"	Days 6-7	May 30, 2019
In awe of their sudden blindside of Paul, the Amigos officially brought Seipei into the alliance, but the relief was short-lived when it was discovered that Paul had possession of the tribe's flint as he left the game. This was yet another kick to Sa'ula's morale in desperate need of a challenge win. The previous night, Jacques showed off his extra vote advantage and the idol on Ta'alo's beach to Ting Ting, in the hopes of forming an alliance with her. At Laumei, in an attempt to solidify a core alliance with Mmaba, Geoffrey informed her about Rocco's plans for an all-boys alliance. Mmaba relayed the information to Rose-Lee, who was concerned about her own position in her alliance.: Reward/Immunity Challenge: In two teams of pairs, and one solo tribe member, the three tribes must traverse in tandem through a mud obstacle course to claim a flag. The flag must be carried back through the obstacle course and placed in their tribe's respective bucket. The first tribe to place their flag in their bucket scores a point. The first tribe to score three points wins luxury comfort items and a fire-making kit, and immunity. The two remaining tribes then will play a solo Sudden death round, where the first to return through the obstacle course with their flag wins a tarp and flint, and the second immunity idol.; Sa'ula won an emotional victory over Laumei and Ta'alo, securing their first challenge win and immunity. Rocco narrowly outreached Danté in the Sudden Death round to secure second for Laumei. As winning duties, Sa'ula were given the opportunity to send one of Ta'alo to the Island of Secrets, opting to send Tania in the hopes that meant Ta'alo had to vote out someone stronger instead. At the Island of Secrets, Tania celebrated her luck when her dilemma was to either return to her tribe the next day for Tribal Council, or to remain in exile and get the pick of any tribe she wants at the upcoming tribe swap, including kicking a player out of a tribe if she chose a tribe of six to join. She took the exile to save herself from being the obvious boot. Ta'alo, upon returning from the challenge, were concerned that Tania would gain an idol or an advantage while at the Island of Secrets that would put a wrench in their plans. The next morning, their fears were confirmed when Tree Mail informed them that Tania was not returning. The men in the tribe started to throw out Ting Ting's name, as she was the pawn to split votes in case Tania had an idol, for being the next weakest player. Jacques was not on board with the plan, and decided that Cobus needed to be idoled out. However, when Jacques surprised Ta'alo with the hidden immunity idol, he saw their shock, panicked, and played the idol on himself instead of Ting Ting; to her devastation, she was voted out.
93	4	"I'm Not Gonna Buy This B.S."	Days 8-9	June 6, 2019
After his blunder with the idol at Tribal Council, Jacques felt that he had completely burnt his game with the Ta'alo tribe, yet he chose to lie about how he found the idol by claiming that he got a clue during the first reward challenge. The men at Ta'alo were confounded by Jacques' idol reveal and play. Jacques' wishes for a tribe swap were granted that morning, with the tribes reshuffling into three tribes of six. Ta'alo reformed with Danté and Meryl remaining, with Rocco, Laetitia, Nicole, and Rob. Sa'ula retained Nathan and Steffi, who were joined by Cobus, Geoffrey, Mike, and Mmaba. Durão and Rose-Lee were then joined by Felix, Jacques and Seipei on Laumei. Tania's return from the Island of Secrets came with the reveal that she could choose any tribe to join, potentially kicking out a player if she chose either Ta'alo or Sa'ula. However, she decided to try her luck in the new Laumei because of Seipei's parting words when she exiled Tania. At the new Ta'alo, Danté disclosed what had happened at the last Tribal Council to the new tribe members, to Meryl's annoyance. Rob protected the Amigos' idol by saying they had blindsided Paul with an idol in his pocket. Over at Sa'ula, Nathan tried to gain favour with the new tribe members by saying that the Sa'ula idol was missing. While the new Laumei was adjusting to their new camp, Jacques bolted to the Laumei well to search for their idol, which he eventually discovered.: Reward/Immunity Challenge: Starting with a single tribe member, each tribe must traverse an obstacle course while walking with planks and ropes. After each obstacle, a new tribe member must attach their planks to the tribe's train, until they form a four person plank train. At the end of the obstacle course, the tribes must collect a key hanging above the course and pass along their planks to two puzzle builders. The puzzle builders must use the planks to solve a staircase puzzle and release a locked bag of sandbags using their tribe's key. The first two tribes to throw and land five sandbags on top of five cargo boxes win immunity. The first place tribe wins a rib braai feast and spices to keep at their camp, while the tribe that placed second received two slabs of ribs for reward.; Initially falling far behind at the beginning of the challenge, Laumei clawed their way back to the point where the tribes were one sandbag away from winning. However, Ta'alo and Sa'ula won the challenge regardless. Given the opportunity to exile a member of Laumei to the Island of Secrets until after tribal, Rob loudly pushed to protect Seipei in front of the cast. Seipei was disappointed that she couldn't spend more time with Laumei, and that, besides the fact that she would skip tribal, she gained nothing else from the Island. Rob's campaigning for Seipei at the challenge led Mike to distrust Nathan's suggestions at the new Sa'ula to break down old tribal lines. Seipei's exile left Rose-Lee and Durão desperate to find a crack with the old Ta'alo members, even making a fake immunity idol for Durão after failing to find an idol around camp. Jacques decided that he needed to try to regain trust with Felix, and revealed that he had found the Laumei idol, but it led to an argument between the two about how to use the idol to broker trust between them. Jacques' frustration with Felix made him consider to flip at a later stage by keeping Durão over Rose-Lee and Seipei down the line. Despite knowing that the original Ta'alo tribe wanted to vote her out, Tania decided to side with Felix after learning about Jacques' idol play. At Tribal Council, frustrations between the original Ta'alo tribe showed cracks were forming. But even with Durão bluffing that he had an idol he could use, and Rose-Lee and Jacques clashing about the original Laumei's loyalties, Rose-Lee was sent home due to being seen as physically weaker than Durão.
94	5	"It's Time for a Hail Mary"	Days 10-12	June 13, 2019
Despite being on the bottom of the new Laumei, Durão started to bond with Jacques as a means of moving forward, while Felix expressed frustration about being forced to work with Jacques and Tania to survive the new Laumei.: Reward Challenge: The three tribes played a Matching Game, taking turns to reveal matching tiles. The first tribe to score seven pairs, won an afternoon away at a smoothie and fruit bar, with the second tribe to score seven pairs receiving a plate of fruit to take to camp.; Sitting out of the challenge, Nathan and Rob compared notes of the tribe dynamics of Ta'alo and Sa'ula, pinpointing Geoffrey, Jacques, and Mike as threats to the Amigos at merge. Using this information, after Ta'alo placed first, Rob convinced Ta'alo to send Geoffrey to the Island of Secrets. Once at the island, Geoffrey was offered a temptation dilemma between a jar of sweets or dry firewood for his tribe when he returned to camp. He chose to take the sweets and share it with Sa'ula on his return to gain trust before the immunity challenge. On the reward, Meryl spotted a clue in the roof of the smoothie bar hut and retrieved it with the help of Danté, with the clue indicating that an idol will be hidden at the next immunity challenge.: Immunity Challenge: One at a time, castaways from each tribe must swim from their starting platform in the ocean to a high rise platform to retrieve a hanging puzzle bag. Once a bag has been grabbed and/or knocked down into the water, the next tribe member can swim to retrieve their bag. Once all five bags have been collected, the tribes must head to their puzzle stations on the shore to solve five sliding puzzles. The first four sliding puzzles releases five pieces needed to solve the final sliding puzzle. The first two tribes to complete their last sliding puzzle win immunity.; Nathan had intended to throw the challenge to get rid of Mmaba, to weaken the original Laumei numbers. However, numerous attempts during the challenge were thwarted by Jacques struggling with the final sliding puzzle. Meryl retrieved the hidden immunity idol after securing Ta'alo's win, choosing to reveal the idol to the tribe back at camp. Long after Ta'alo had won immunity, Nathan gave up his attempt to throw the challenge to send Laumei back to Tribal Council. Felix's behavior at the immunity challenge alienated himself from the entire tribe, even when Jacques ignored any help from Seipei with the sliding puzzles. Jacques, Seipei, and Tania felt it was time to cut Felix, roping in a willing Durão. With Felix still believing that Durão's days were numbered, the entire Laumei tribe blindsided him the next day at Tribal Council.
95	6	"Let Them Play Barbie and Ken"	Days 13-14	June 20, 2019
After the successful blindside of Felix, Jacques revealed to the rest of Laumei that he had both the Laumei idol and the merge vote advantage. The four bonded and formed an alliance dubbed the Band of Misfits. Cobus and Steffi were concerned about Nathan's desire to remain in the game after trying to throw the previous immunity challenge, while Danté stole Ta'alo's flint to weaken Rob's standing among the tribe.: Reward Challenge: Taking turns, each tribe uses a slingshot to launch a ball to one of two of their tribe's catchers. The catchers must defend themselves from the opposing tribes while catching their balls. Any tribe who successfully catches a ball scores a point for their tribe. The first tribe to score five points wins a coffee making set, with donuts as reward.; Outnumbered by two tribe members, Laumei pulled out a victory, and was given the option to send a player from both Sa'ula and Ta'alo to the Island of Secrets. Seipei elected for two Amigos, Nathan and Nicole, to be exiled. At the Island of Secrets, the two Amigos caught up with their respective tribe dynamics, and received two halves of an immunity idol. Nathan decided that Nicole needed the split idol as her and Rob were on the bottom of Ta'alo. With the flint gone, Rob saw the opportunity to take the blame so that he could idol Danté out of the game. The members of Sa'ula were relieved that Nathan's negative influence was absent for a night.: Immunity Challenge: Four tribe members must lift a platform off the ground while balancing on four beams. One at a time, each tribe member must stack a block tower on their platform, spelling out the word "Immunity". If a tribe member falls off their beam, or their tower falls, the tribe must restart their stack. The first two tribes to complete their ten-piece tower and return to their starting positions on the beams win immunity.; Sa'ula placed first, while all hopes of the Band of Misfits from Laumei surviving until the merge were defeated with a last minute second place win by Ta'alo at the immunity challenge. Returning from the Island of Secrets, Nathan and Nicole both lied about what happened, with Nicole revealing she only has half an idol and a clue. Nathan revealed the entire dynamic of Ta'alo to Sa'ula, who struggled to believe him despite his renewed energy for the game. Before Tribal Council, Laumei held an open forum to decide who goes home, with the majority pointing out Tania was the least connected with the other tribes. Tania tried to recruit Durão and Seipei to blindside Jacques with his idol and advantage. However, it fell on deaf ears eventually with the entire tribe voting Tania out after a strong, final fight at Tribal Council.
96	7	"The Game Chooses for You"	Day 15-16	June 27, 2019
Day 15 started with treemail suggesting a tribe shuffle or merge. The Band of Misfits decided that whatever happened, no one else must know about the Laumei idol. Standing at the reward challenge, the players were tasked with picking between 15 bowls of paint, indicating their new tribe colours. Steffi picked the only bowl that had water instead of paint, meaning she was to be exiled at the Island of Secrets where she will spectate at the upcoming immunity challenge and Tribal Council, before joining the losing tribe after they have voted out a member of their tribe.: Reward Challenge: Spread across a wire maze structure, each tribe must carry a ball with small paddles, passing the ball at regular intervals. If the paddles touch the maze or the ball falls off their paddles, the tribe must restart from the beginning of the maze. The first tribe to drop three balls into a chute at the end of their wire maze wins all the reward items from Laumei and a bag of rice.; Ta'alo won the challenge. Over at the new Sa'ula, Meryl and Danté initially felt excited about meeting new players, but the original Laumei members of Durão, Geoffrey, and Mmaba gravitated towards Nicole and Nathan. Durão chose to reveal all the advantages that Jacques had at Laumei. The two original Ta'alo members tried to warn Mmaba about Nicole potentially having a full idol in her possession, but she remained skeptical of Meryl and Danté's intentions. Meanwhile at the new Ta'alo, Rocco spilled all the information about what he suspected was a tight Sa'ula four. However, Seipei's insistent pressure on having the physical players to start taking people out got on the nerves of some of the tribe. Both tribes discussed the Sa'ula idol, with the conflicting stories at the first swap confusing the original Laumei members.: Immunity Challenge: Each tribe member is attached in a rope chain and carrying a sandbag; they must complete laps along the shore and ocean without being caught by the opposing tribe. Tribe members may opt out, but they have to pass over their sandbag to another tribe member while they leave the chain. The tribe who is able to reach and tag the opposing tribe wins immunity.; With Seipei tiring out early, and Laetitia injuring her leg, forcing her to opt out in the middle of the challenge, the new Ta'alo stood no chance and were easily caught by Sa'ula. Laetitia was worried that she would be targeted for her injury and age, and she tried to pin a target on Seipei due to her worse performance in the challenge. But the men of the tribe had other plans; Rob initiated the plan for the tribe to vote out Rocco, for his perceived physical threat when the merge arrives. Rocco noticed that the tribe wasn't interacting with him as much after the immunity challenge, and he tried to rally people into blindsiding Rob as he had no original Sa'ula ally to protect him. At Tribal Council, however, the Ta'alo tribe unanimously decided that Rocco was too much of a physical threat at the merge and voted him out of the game.
97	8	"Putting My Foot in My Mouth"	Day 17-19	July 4, 2019
Danté's frustration with the original Laumei members' lack of contribution at camp was beginning to create animosity in Sa'ula. Nathan decided to capitalize on the tension to shift any attention on him and Nicole, and to solidify a partnership with Geoffrey and Mmaba in a potential merge.: Reward Challenge: A member from each tribe are wrapped around a pole, while two members from the opposing tribe must pry them off the pole and drag them across to a finish line. The first tribe to do so scores a point. The first to three points wins a pizza and cool drink feast back at camp.; Despite it being Mmaba's birthday, Sa'ula were unable to compete against the physically stronger Ta'alo. Mmaba's lackluster performance drew more ire from Danté, while Laetitia surprised Ta'alo with her strength in the challenge. Seipei suggested to Ta'alo to not send someone to the Island of Secrets who had been before, so Durão was chosen from Sa'ula to go. At the Island of Secrets, Durão received a hidden immunity idol only valid for the next Tribal Council to secure himself into the merge afterwards. Although Steffi's arrival at Ta'alo gave Rob an opportunity to reunite with another Amigo, her constant strategic talk was interfering with his plans to work with Mike and reunite with Nathan at the merge. Instead, Rob chose to confirm with Mike that there is still a Sa'ula idol in play to form trust between the two.: Immunity Challenge: One at a time, members from each tribe must traverse over obstacles while balancing a ball on a high pole. Midway through the course, they must hand over their portion of the pole and ball to their tribe member to balance their ball on a higher pole through the course. Once the tribes have successfully carried two balls across the course, two blindfolded tribe members must manipulate one ball at a time through a vertical wheel maze with the help of a caller. The first tribe to land both of their balls into a basket beneath the maze wins immunity.; After injuring his hand with the machete a few days prior, Nathan on the vertical maze cost Sa'ula immunity at the last minute. Despite this loss, Nathan was still adamant that the tribe take out Danté or Meryl. Durão returned to the tribe and withheld the fact that merge was happening after this Tribal Council, and this left Sa'ula in a predicament about keeping Nathan or taking out Danté. Geoffrey proposed to Durão, Mmaba, and Nicole that he'll antagonize Danté and Meryl at Tribal Council, so that they could flush out Meryl's idol and blindside Nathan to keep the tribe strong for future challenges. Emotional about this decision, Nicole stuck to the plan, while Geoffrey caused a spectacle at Tribal Council to flush Meryl's idol. Nicole apologized to Nathan about the blindside as the final vote revealed that he was being sent home.
98	9	"Are You Crying?"	Day 20-22	July 11, 2019
After Tribal Council, Danté and Meryl argued with Nicole over Nathan's blindside and the plot to flush Meryl's idol. The next morning, the 13 remaining players were merged into a single tribe, Manumalo. Rob was stunned to see that Sa'ula had voted out Nathan. At the merge feast, Geoffrey took note of Danté and Meryl's strategizing, while Nicole tried to explain her betrayal to the remaining Amigos. Though the seven former members of the third Ta'alo tribe formed a majority alliance, dubbed the Spit-Shake Seven, they were divided on who to target between Danté, Geoffrey and Nicole. Nicole gave Nathan's half of the split idol to Seipei as a means to rebuild trust within the Amigos and remain on Rob's good side. Cobus, Jacques and Mike, noting Nathan's importance to Rob's game, tried to individually bond with Rob while building the tribe's new shelter.: Immunity Challenge: Standing on a thin beam, each tribe member must hold up a bar above their heads. If they fall off their beam or lower their bars, a bucket full of coloured water falls on top of them and they are out of the challenge. The last person standing wins immunity and the power to send the player of their choice to the Island of Secrets until after the next Tribal Council.; Though the Spit-Shake Seven were worried about Geoffrey's history as an endurance athlete, Steffi outlasted him in the immunity challenge and elected to send herself to the Island of Secrets, trusting the Amigos' plan to take out Geoffrey as a physical and strategic threat. Back at camp, Danté and Meryl tried to rope in the original Ta'alo members and Laetitia to eliminate Geoffrey with Jacques' extra vote. However, Meryl's campaigning was deemed too threatening compared to Geoffrey's more laidback approach, and the majority decided to target her first before Geoffrey. Jacques used his extra vote as a cover to regain trust with Danté, knowing that Meryl was about to be voted out regardless of any last minute scrambling. Despite Durão's warnings at Tribal Council, Meryl was eliminated by a 7-6 vote and became the first member of the jury.
99	10	"He's Delicious-Looking..."	Day 23-24	July 18, 2019
Despite the close vote at Tribal Council, Geoffrey was in good spirits about his allegiances in the new Manumalo, while Rob was glad that the Spit-Shake Seven alliance had yet to be discovered. However, both Geoffrey and Nicole started to notice how allies were running towards Rob for strategic advice around camp.: Reward Challenge: In three teams of four, each team must traverse a three stage obstacle course and untie bags of discs. At the end of the obstacle course, one team member must slide their discs up a curved curling board and land them in a net on the other side. The first team to score ten discs into their net wins an overnight getaway with sandwiches, champagne and spa treatments. The winning team could exile anyone from the two losing teams to the Island of Secrets.; Danté, Durão, Geoffrey, and Mmaba won the reward, with Durão suggesting that Jacques be exiled as he could be trusted about what happens on the Island of Secrets. When Jacques arrived at the Island of Secrets, he received an advantage where he could replace anyone who wins a future reward challenge. On reward, Danté tried to convince Geoffrey to set their differences aside so that the players on the bottom could take out Rob or Steffi. Back at camp, Laetitia's poor physical performance in the challenge started to overwhelm and embarrass her. She requested the tribe to vote her off at the next Tribal Council for being a challenge liability, but Mike felt it would be a missed opportunity for a strategic move and tried to convince Laetitia to quit instead. Eventually, she chose to remain in the game after being approached by the tribe to not give up.: Immunity Challenge: Each tribe member will place themselves under a steel grid in the ocean, and remain under their portion of the grid while the tide rises to restrict their access to air. The last person to remain under the steel grid wins immunity. A plate of nachos was offered for any tribe members who chose to opt out in partaking in the challenge.; With Cobus, Jacques, and Seipei opting for nachos over performing the challenge, Geoffrey, Rob, and Steffi were the final three remaining in the challenge yet again. This time, Rob pulled out the win against Steffi. Returning to camp, the Spit-Shake alliance were determined to vote out Geoffrey, with Rob pulling in both Durão and Nicole to secure an overwhelming amount of numbers. Danté, however, pushed for Geoffrey to arrange numbers to vote out Nicole, so that the original Sa'ula members don't take control of the merge. Mike felt guilty about having to prove himself to his newer alliance by voting against Geoffrey, and Geoffrey tried to use Danté's scrambling to shift the target off of himself. However, the Spit-Shake alliance were set in stone and sent Geoffrey to the jury as its second member.
100	11	"The Puppetmaster"	Day 25-26	July 25, 2019
While Rob and Seipei's plan to eliminate Geoffrey went down perfectly, Mmaba was left distraught with Mike's betrayal of their Day 1 alliance from the original Laumei tribe. Seipei's social game throughout the camp was becoming more apparent to Laetitia and Rob, with the latter learning that Seipei intended to get rid of the other women in the Amigo alliance after the Spit-Shake alliance takes out Danté and Laetitia. Treemail arrived with a bag of blocks for the tribe to draw for teams for the upcoming reward and immunity challenge. After three teams of three were drawn, Cobus and Nicole drew white blocks and were immediately exiled to the Island of Secrets.: Island of Secrets Immunity Duel: The two castaways who were exiled to the Island of Secrets had to compete in solving their respective tangram puzzle. The first to complete their puzzle won immunity for themselves at the next Tribal Council.; Cobus demolished the puzzle to the surprise of both him and Nicole, both of them wondering if treemail had lied to the remaining members of Manumalo and that this duel was the immunity challenge. During their time at the Island of Secrets, Nicole used the exile to barter information with Cobus, as she identified that he was in between a lot of alliances but not ruffling feathers, telling him about the split idol and that Seipei had the other half.: Reward/Immunity Challenge: One member from each team at a time would release a puzzle piece from a dispenser, and traverse through an obstacle course to a 4x4 wall board. When the first team member has arrived at their team mat and placed a puzzle piece on the board, the next tribe member can release a new puzzle piece and complete the course. Once all three team members have retrieved their first piece, they must go back through the course to release and retrieve their remaining puzzle pieces. When they have collected their last puzzle piece and returned to the board, the teams are allowed to solve the puzzle where no symbol and no colours must repeat on each vertical and horizontal line of the board. The first team to correctly assemble the puzzle wins a trip to a waterfall escape for a spaghetti and champagne lunch, as well as individual immunity for each team member.; Danté, Jacques, and Mike were the victors in the challenge, ruining the Spit-Shake alliance's plans of eliminating Danté as one of the last remaining outsiders. When Rob and the alliance were shifting their sights on Mmaba, Seipei tried to change Rob's mind and vote out Laetitia first, as both Danté and Mmaba were expendable at any moment. After the discussions before and after the challenge, Rob figured out that Seipei was playing multiple sides and not loyal to the Amigos solely anymore. As Seipei tried to consolidate a final three deal with Jacques and Rob that night, it confirmed to Rob that Seipei needed to go immediately. When Cobus and Nicole returned from the Island of Secrets the next day, the tribe was shocked to find out that a fourth tribe member was immune for the upcoming Tribal Council. Rob and Nicole managed to retrieve Seipei's half of the split idol while making sure Jacques was unaware and couldn't play an idol on Seipei. When Durão and Mike approached Danté and Mmaba bring them into the blindside, Danté tried to convince the men that Seipei wasn't the real puppet master threat, but actually Rob. It fell on deaf ears though, when the Amigos and the Spit-Shake alliances blindsided one of their own, making Seipei the third member of the jury.
101	12	"One Trick Pony"	Day 27-28	August 1, 2019
While Danté was left frustrated with the original Laumei members in not voting out Rob, Jacques and Cobus confronted Rob about leaving them out of Seipei's blindside. The morning after, knowing that the others were not listening to him, Danté resigned himself to saving his strength for the immunity challenge.: Reward Challenge: The castaways must maneuver a cylinder attached to a rope over a three stage course; the first six to reach the end of the course advanced to the second stage of the challenge. The second stage involved each castaway digging up and stacking cylinders from their respective sandboxes; the first three to find and stack all 12 cylinders and cross the finish line advanced to the final stage. The final three remaining castaways had to carry their cylinders stacked on a tray over a balance beam, and use their cylinders to complete a puzzle. The first to complete their puzzle wins an overnight stay away from camp with a traditional Samoan feast and performance from a local village.; Danté's third reward win in a row got on the nerves of the Amigos, especially with Danté sending Durão to the Island of Secrets and taking the remaining original Laumei members on reward with him. The Amigos, with Cobus and Jacques, vowed to beat Danté at the immunity challenge or else Mmaba would take the fall. Overnight on the reward, Danté tried to rally Laetitia, Mike, and Mmaba to form a proper alliance to take out the social threats, Cobus and Jacques, instead of Rob. However, when Mike returned to camp, he informed Rob of the plan made on reward to scare Jacques into playing his idol and blindsiding Cobus. During his exile at the Island of Secrets, Durão was offered a temptation to study for the immunity challenge and forfeit his vote at Tribal Council; wanting to be able to say he won an immunity challenge, he accepted the temptation and studied a cheat sheet overnight until he arrived at the immunity challenge.: Immunity Challenge: Nico reveals a sequence of symbols to the tribe, with the tribe having to correctly remember and identify each symbol of the sequence. If a castaway presents the wrong symbol to Nico, they are eliminated from the challenge. The last castaway remaining wins immunity.; A stunned Manumalo watched Durão win immunity over everyone else, believing that he received an advantage while at the Island of Secrets, but it left the majority alliance's plan to take out Danté intact. With concerns about Jacques' idol, the Amigos and Mike decided to try to make Jacques feel paranoid enough to play his idol. Mike and the Laumei members agreed to vote Jacques to make him feel less safe going forward, with the Amigos and Ta'alo men voting Danté. At Tribal Council, Danté brought up that he was noticing all the strategic players were being taken out while a majority of the players remaining were playing like lapdogs to a leading alliance. Rob alluded to the tribe blindsiding Seipei at the last Tribal Council as the group coming to a consensus that some players were playing for the long haul too early, with Steffi not so subtly suggesting that Jacques would be next. Both Danté and Jacques called out Rob and Steffi on their tactics to sway the votes by painting both of them as threats, when the tribe knew two other idols were in play. While the attempts to get Jacques to play his idol had failed with a split vote strategy, Danté was still voted out and became the fourth member of the jury.
102	13	"Trouble Council"	Day 29-30	August 8, 2019
Despite being included in the vote for Danté, Cobus and Jacques were frustrated that the Spit-Shake alliance were leaving them out of the loop, while Steffi was frustrated that Jacques didn't fall for the Amigos' pressure to flush out his idol. Trust within the Spit-Shake alliance left Cobus, Jacques, and even Nicole feeling vulnerable with how the last two Tribal Councils went.: Reward Challenge: Each castaway must hold a key above a tile using two handles for as long as possible. If they drop their key and smash their tile, they are out of the challenge. However, the tribe will only compete against others who choose the same reward as them: a meal, a letter from home, or an advantage.; Competing against Nicole, Durão volunteered to give up a meal for her. Cobus, Jacques, Laetitia, Mike, and Steffi fought for letters from home, with Mike eventually giving up to let Steffi receive her letters. This left Mmaba and Rob competing for an advantage. A slip from Mmaba let Rob win the advantage which he would receive in exile at the Island of Secrets. At the Island of Secrets, Rob's advantage included the other two rewards from the challenge, as well as the opportunity to practice on the last stage of the upcoming immunity challenge. At camp, the Amigos and original Laumei members united to split votes on Jacques and Cobus, in the hopes that Jacques and his idol are either both out of the game, or at least the idol would be flushed out and Cobus as a social threat is eliminated. Meanwhile, Jacques and Cobus tried to negotiate trust in the Spit-Shake alliance to target Durão or Mmaba, with Jacques willing to play his idol.: Reward/Immunity Challenge: The castaways must balance a ball through two obstacles on a bow to reach a board at the end of the course. Once they have balanced 3 balls to their respective boards, the first castaway to successfully land their three balls in holes along their balancing board wins immunity, and a month's test drive with a Mahindra XUV300 on their return to South Africa.; Rob's win over Cobus and Jacques at the immunity challenge allowed for the Amigos to implement their split vote to flush out Jacques and/or his idol. However, Cobus and Jacques were tired of being left out of the alliance's strategizing and tried to rally the original Laumei members into blindsiding Steffi. At Tribal Council, Jacques wore his idol around his neck, informing Nico of the alliance consensus that he would play his idol so he can last until the loved ones' visit, while Cobus expressed frustration of being left out of his own alliance. When the votes were counted, the Amigos' plan backfired when Jacques refused to play his idol, Cobus and Jacques didn't fall for their false target, and Cobus was sent to the jury instead of Jacques.
103	14	"The Biggest Mother-"	Day 31-32	August 15, 2019
As Manumalo returned to camp, Steffi told the tribe she accidentally voted for Cobus when the plan was to either vote Jacques out with the idol or flush it out of the game. While the tribe congratulated Jacques for his bold move, he openly declared that he would use his idol to take out the biggest player left if the rest of the tribe targeted him at the next Tribal Council, and the others reacted in shock and disgust by the language he used. After immediately apologizing, the tribe told him off and collaborated to excommunicate Jacques from all camp life and strategic talk. Treemail arrived on Day 31 telling Manumalo to exile two people to the Island of Secrets. Mmaba and Laetitia initially volunteered, with Mmaba reasoning that she has never been, but Steffi stepped in suggesting that there might be food based on treemail and that she hasn't eaten protein since the merge feast.: Reward Duel: The two castaways exiled to the Island of Secrets were treated to a large meal, and competed on the beach in a game of Connect 4. The first to win 3 rounds would receive an advantage from the Island of Secrets.; Mmaba won the advantage, which was a clue to an idol inside the voting urn at Tribal Council, but she chose to lie to Steffi that it could give her an advantage in a challenge of her choosing until the final five. With Jacques being portrayed as public enemy number one, Mike saw an opportunity to rally numbers to blindside Rob with the former Laumei members and Nicole. However, Durão's loyalties with Rob and the Amigos left the alliance aware of Mike's intentions, and prepared a blindside of their own.: Immunity Challenge: Starting from the shore, the castaways have to race out to a wooden cage out in the ocean to untie a key. The key opens a box back at the shore that releases a second key attached to knotted ropes. The second key must be shaken through the two knotted ropes until it reaches a second box. After retrieving a puzzle bag from their second box, the castaway who is able to complete their 3D puzzle first wins immunity.; Jacques kept up with the Amigos in the challenge up until the puzzle, when Rob gave hints to Steffi and Nicole to help them complete the puzzle faster, Nicole eventually managed to pull out a victory at the last minute. The Amigos were relieved that Jacques would be forced to use his idol, with Rob knowing that Mike will assume that Rob is left exposed for a blindside. The Amigos continued to actively exclude Jacques from all strategic talk at camp, telling him to leave everyone alone while they talked game with the rest of the tribe. Steffi returned to camp to inform the Amigos about Mmaba's "advantage", which shifted the Amigos' plan from taking out Mike to Mmaba, while still loading votes onto Jacques to get rid of his idol. Mike started to back down on his plans to blindside Rob when Rob approached him about his own fake vote viewing advantage and opted to stick to a decoy plan of Laetitia as the back-up. At Tribal Council, the tribe explained the events after the previous council to the jury, revealing to them why Jacques had been socially isolated. Immediately after explaining his side of the story, Jacques stood up and played his idol and openly declared to the tribe and jury he was voting for Rob and was willing to talk to anyone to join him. However, the entire tribe stated that their plans had not changed. When Laetitia implied that she was remaining loyal to the Spit-Shake alliance, Jacques pointed out that the jury was evidence that that alliance was being betrayed by themselves. Before the vote happened, Mmaba did express that she was concerned for her safety, and while Jacques tried to capitalize on that to encourage her to flip, she continued to ignore him along with the rest of the tribe. During the vote, Mmaba collected the idol hidden inside the voting urn; while she and Mike stuck to the voting plan of loading votes onto Jacques despite already having made himself immune, the two allies were yet another victim to the Amigos as Mmaba joined the jury, blindsided with the new idol in her pocket.
104	15	"The Lightbulbs Are Switching On"	Day 33-34	August 22, 2019
As the tribe returned to camp, Rob initially did damage control with Mike, explaining that Mmaba had an advantage, but lied that the alliance didn't want to force Mike to betray another ally like Geoffrey. The Amigos and Laetitia were grateful that Jacques had finally used his idol and was left exposed. Rob continued to reassure Mike into Day 33 as a means to prevent Mike from making another blindside attempt on the Amigos leader. However, Mike broke the Amigos' embargo and openly strategized with Jacques and Durão, with the latter informing the Amigos immediately afterwards.: Survivor Yankee Swap: Each tribe member drew in a lotto for a selection of rewards offered to them by Nico. Starting with the tribe member standing closest to Nico and the rewards, the first tribe member would be given an option to accept a covered reward. Every tribe member after the first, would then be given their own covered reward or the option to swap with any reward that has previously been taken by the tribe members before them. Once all seven members of the tribe have selected their rewards, the first in line would be given an option to swap with all the other rewards. The rewards ranged from a chocolate cake, letters from home to share with another tribe member, the ability to have portions from everyone's food rewards, to an exile on the Island of Secrets.; The Amigos succeeded in preventing Jacques from getting any form of advantage, when Steffi swapped rewards and ended up on the Island of Secrets. Awaiting her there was a reward feast and a surprise visit from her loved one, her best friend Gina. During the meal, Steffi and Gina broke down her game, with Gina pointing out that her strongest allies, Rob and Nicole, were most likely her biggest threats and that she needed to start taking down the Amigos if she wants to win.: Immunity Challenge: Using a pulley to raise a steady platform, each tribe member has to stack a large tower of cards without it falling. The first tribe member to reach past the red flag on their measuring rule besides their station, wins immunity.; Mike narrowly beat out Rob for the win, feeling relieved that despite being on the outs of his alliance, he could try to rebuild trust with Durão and Rob. The tribe's plans were to load up votes again on Jacques, though they began to worry about his frantic search for a new hidden immunity idol. Jacques' search for the idol was in vain, when Laetitia stumbled upon the idol and pocketed it for herself. Rob, sensing that because Jacques would most likely target him or Steffi in the event of an idol, suggested to the other men to vote Steffi as a back-up plan. Meanwhile, Steffi suggested to the women that they stick to the plan for one more tribal before blindsiding Rob. At Tribal Council, Durão bragged about his comfortable position in the game, with Jacques as target number one. The majority alliance acknowledged that once Jacques was out, the game would shift permanently based on the relationships they had formed, and that he was not an option to consider changing plans. Without an idol to save himself, Jacques was sent to the jury in a close 4-3 vote over Steffi, who was in tears learning that she became the new back-up plan instead of Durão.
105	16	"Someone You Can Trust"	Day 35	August 29, 2019
After Jacques' ouster, a shellshocked Steffi decided that Rob's control of the votes was over, but that she had to make him see remaining loyalty from her. Rob tried to explain that he was trying to protect Laetitia and her in the event that Jacques had an idol, and that the Amigos were still tight.: Reward/Immunity Challenge: Paired with their loved ones, each tribe member would be locked to a starting post, with their loved ones untying 25 knots to release a box full of sandbags and a key. Once their loved one retrieves the key and unlocks their respective tribe member, the tribe member must use the sandbags to knock down targets. The first to knock down all five targets wins an afternoon braai at camp with their loved one, and decide which half of the tribe is exiled to the Island of Secrets.; Rob and his mother, Josie, dominated the challenge over everyone else, putting a stop to the women's blindside plans. After the challenge, Rob was allowed to select two tribe members to have their loved ones join the reward, and he chose Laetitia and her daughter, Leandré; but upset the rest of the tribe when he chose Steffi and her best friend, Gina, due to Steffi's hunger. Devastated that she couldn't hear news from her boyfriend, Clint, about her children, Nicole understood that it was sound strategy to isolate the Laumei men. At the Island of Secrets, the three exiled were informed that they'd be attending Tribal Council that evening without returning to camp. With this in mind, Mike tried to rally Durão and Nicole into blindsiding Steffi to weaken Rob's control in the game, but Nicole feared that Mike didn't have the numbers. During the reward, Laetitia, in a moment of joy, revealed to Steffi and Rob that she held an idol, with Steffi telling her later that she shouldn't have let Rob know. The three on reward assured each other that Mike would be the one going to the jury before being sent to Tribal Council, with the two women plotting out how they would blindside Rob at the next vote. Initially at Tribal Council, Nicole expressed frustration with Rob's decision to exile her, but understood the rationale behind his actions. However, Durão called him out with his reasoning for picking Steffi, despite multiple trips to the Island of Secrets where she could have had food. When asked about the vote, Rob emphasized that he would stay true to his longest connections, which made Durão uncertain about his place in the game. Before the vote could begin, Rob bluntly asked Nicole what happened at the Island of Secrets. Nicole bit back at Rob questioning her loyalty, and Mike capitalized to ask Rob of the plan. Rob revealed that it was Mike, due to his earlier attempts to blindside him. This revelation caused Mike to finally figure out Rob's end game being an original Sa'ula Final Three and aired it out in the open. This left Durão confused and rattled, with the two original Laumei men learning that Laetitia had betrayed them too. While the vote occurred, Mike tried to get Durão and Nicole to reveal who informed Rob of his plans, but it was for naught, as the Amigos (with Laetitia) voted to send Mike to the jury.
106	17	"Icarus"	Day 36-37	September 5, 2019
After successfully removing Mike from the game, Laetitia, Nicole, and Steffi gathered after returning to camp, solidifying their plans to blindside Rob next with an idol in his pocket. Meanwhile, a rattled Durão struggled to accept that he had been betrayed by Rob the entire merge and felt defeated. The morning after, the Amigos and Laetitia all confirmed their idols to one another and decided that if Durão didn't win immunity that none of them will play their idols, instead choosing to wear them to brag to the jury. The women tried to make Rob feel comfortable enough to not play his idol if he lost immunity.: Reward Challenge: Each tribe member must balance a disc with a goblet on top of a pole. At regular intervals, they must add more segments to their pole while switching between two hands and one. The last tribe member to have their goblet balancing on their pole tower wins an afternoon trip to a neighbouring island inhabited by bats with a picnic lunch of hot dogs, chips, and drinks.; Rob won the reward and, when given the opportunity to take someone on reward, he chose Nicole to apologize for his decision to exclude her from the loved ones' reward. He also decided that Laetitia was to be exiled to the Island of Secrets. In exile, Laetitia received a Vote Nullifier that she could use at the next Tribal Council or at the Final 4. Rob's challenge dominance started to get on Steffi's nerves, and she felt as though the opportunity to make her move on him was slipping away.: Immunity Challenge: Traversing a sand maze, each tribe member must untie and retrieve 5 puzzle bags stationed throughout the maze one at a time. Once they have collected all their bags at their station, they can complete a three-tiered puzzle. The first to complete their puzzle correctly wins immunity.; Rob's fourth immunity win left the women's plans dead in the water, resigning to vote out Durão. However, upon returning from the Island of Secrets, Laetitia chose to not reveal her new advantage to the Amigos, which was a red flag for Nicole. Laetitia chose to reveal it privately to Steffi, solidifying a back-up plan to use it on Nicole at Final 4 if Rob won final immunity. Nicole took Rob aside to reveal the women's failed plans to blindside him, and the two decided to change their plans. At Tribal Council, Durão revealed that the remaining Laumei members would be picked off by the three Amigos, with Rob and Nicole going along with the plan to vote him out. Once the votes were cast, Nicole stunned Durão and the jury by playing her split idol on him, followed by Rob playing his idol on Nicole. The sudden change of plans caused Laetitia to play an idol on herself. This made Steffi the only non-immune player left, and with the only two valid votes cast, she was sent to the jury with Rob and Nicole both letting her know of her betrayal of the Amigos.
107	18	"Action Speaks Louder"	Day 38-39	September 12, 2019
Laetitia was left stunned at Nicole's betrayal at the previous Tribal Council, and dismissed Nicole's apology as lies. Meanwhile, Durão was still struggling to believe that he was in the game. Rob was happy with Nicole's poor jury management and felt that the only things left to survive were Laetitia's vote nullifier and the last immunity challenge.: Final Immunity Challenge: A long wooden dowell rod, about one and a half inches in diameter, was cut into different sized segments. On the center segment, a notch has been cut on which a metal ball rests. The castaways would have to hold up the segments by squeezing them between two handles. At regular intervals, the contestants were allowed to set the cylinders down and a new round started with two additional segments. The castaway who held up their segments the longest without allowing the ball to drop from the center segment would win.; Rob secured his spot in the Final Tribal Council with his third immunity win in a row (fifth overall), and despite Laetitia's attempts to sway the votes onto Nicole, Rob stuck with his ally. At Tribal Council, Laetitia chose not to use her Vote Nullifier as she knew it wouldn't save her, with the two remaining Amigos and Durão joining together to send her to the jury. At the Final Tribal Council, the jury aired their grievances with Rob and Nicole for their ruthless methods in betraying them and controlling the merge. Jacques belittled Durão for betraying all of his original allies that ended up helping Rob and Nicole's strong game. Cobus, Geoffrey, Meryl, and Steffi took Nicole to task for the lies and lengths she went to make it to the end with Rob. Mike and Mmaba both tried to highlight Durão's contributions to the post-merge game, but acknowledged Rob's relationship with Durão as a critical part of how the game ended. Seipei asked Rob about her blindside, in order to explain how it contradicted both his and Nicole's defense of loyalty to the Amigos and the Spit-Shakers. Lastly, Danté demanded an apology for the belittling remarks of "stealing food" that Rob made to justify his removal from the game as a challenge threat. Rob managed to point out his level of awareness of all the votes he partook in throughout the game, and the relationships he made that allowed him that control. Nicole owned up to lying her way through the meaningful connections she used to reach the end alongside her loyal ally Rob, stating that it was her connections that gave Rob the information he needed to help the Amigos move forward in the game. Durão accepted that his game would be misunderstood and accepted the fact that he didn't have much of a chance to win. Despite Seipei and Steffi's surprise votes for Nicole, for doing the dirty work for Rob's game, it wasn't enough as Rob was crowned Sole Survivor for his complete strategic dominance over Nicole's cutthroat game to others and loyal game to Rob, as well as Durão's passive social game. Nicole received four votes to place second over Durão, who received no votes. During the Reunion, it was revealed that Rob had also won the Fan Favourite award for the season and would walk away with a Mahindra KUV100, on top of winning the month long test drive during the game with the Mahindra XUV300.

== Voting history ==
	Original tribes			First swap			Second swap		Merged tribe										
Episode	1	2	3	4	5	6	7	8	9		10	11	12	13	14	15	16	17	18
Day	3	5	7	9	12	14	16	19	22		24	26	28	30	32	34	35	37	38
Eliminated	Lee-Anne	Paul	Ting Ting	Rose-Lee	Felix	Tania	Rocco	Nathan	Meryl		Geoffrey	Seipei	Danté	Cobus	Mmaba	Jacques	Mike	Steffi	Laetitia
Votes	5–2	4–1	4–2	3–2	4–1	3–1	6–1	4–2–0 (Note: Meryl played a hidden immunity idol on herself, therefore one vote against her was not counted.)	7–6		9–2–1	7–2–1–1	5–3–1	5–2–2	5–1–0 (Note: Jacques played a hidden immunity idol on himself, therefore two votes against him were not counted.)	4–3	4–1–1	2–0 (Note: Nicole played a hidden immunity idol on Durão, Rob played a hidden immunity idol on Nicole, and Laetitia played a hidden immunity idol on herself. As Rob had won the immunity challenge, Steffi was the only player non-immune, and was eliminated by default receiving the only two valid votes.)	3–1
Voter	Vote																		
Rob	Lee-Anne	None (Note: Due to losing a game of chance on the Island of Secrets, this castaway lost their vote at the next Tribal Council.)					Rocco		Meryl		Geoffrey	Seipei	Danté	Cobus	Mmaba	Jacques	Mike	~~Laetitia~~	Laetitia
Nicole	Lee-Anne	Paul						Nathan	Meryl		Geoffrey	Seipei	Danté	Cobus	Mmaba	Jacques	Mike	Steffi	Laetitia
Durão				Tania	Felix	Tania		Nathan	Meryl		Geoffrey	Seipei	None (Note: Due to accepting an advantage for an Immunity Challenge, this castaway lost their vote at the next Tribal Council.)	Cobus	Mmaba	Steffi	Steffi	Steffi	Laetitia
Laetitia							Rocco		Geoffrey		Geoffrey	Seipei	Jacques	Jacques	Mmaba	Jacques	Mike	~~Durão~~	Nicole
Steffi	Lee-Anne	Paul					Exiled (Note: Steffi picked the bowl without paint during the second tribe switch. As a result, she was exiled and joined the tribe that lost the next Immunity Challenge, Ta'alo, directly after their Tribal Council.)		Exiled (Note: This castaway was exiled until after the next Tribal Council, which meant they could not be voted out or participate in the vote.)		Geoffrey	Seipei	Danté	Cobus	Mmaba	Jacques	Mike	~~Durão~~	
Mike							Rocco		Meryl		Geoffrey	Seipei	Jacques	Cobus	~~Jacques~~	Steffi	Nicole		
Jacques			Cobus	Rose-Lee	Felix	Tania	Rocco		Geoffrey	Geoffrey (Note: Jacques played the legacy advantage, allowing him to cast two ballots during the first Tribal Council after the merge.)	Geoffrey	Mmaba	Danté	Steffi	Rob	Steffi			
Mmaba								Nathan	Meryl		Danté	Seipei	Jacques	Jacques	~~Jacques~~				
Cobus			Ting Ting				Rocco		Geoffrey		Geoffrey	Durão	Danté	Steffi					
Danté			Ting Ting					Geoffrey	Geoffrey		Nicole	Rob	Cobus						
Seipei	Lee-Anne	Paul		Exiled	Felix	Tania	Rocco		Meryl		Geoffrey	Mmaba							
Geoffrey								Nathan	Meryl		Danté								
Meryl			Ting Ting					Geoffrey	Geoffrey										
Nathan	Lee-Anne	Paul						~~Meryl~~											
Rocco							Rob												
Tania			Exiled	Rose-Lee	Felix	Jacques													
Felix			Ting Ting	Rose-Lee	Durão														
Rose-Lee				Tania															
Ting Ting			Cobus																
Paul	Seipei	Nathan																	
Lee-Anne	Seipei																		

Jury vote
Episode	18		
Day	39		
Finalist	Rob	Nicole	Durão
Votes	6–4–0		
Juror	Vote		
Laetitia	Rob		
Steffi		Nicole	
Mike	Rob		
Jacques		Nicole	
Mmaba	Rob		
Cobus		Nicole	
Danté	Rob		
Seipei		Nicole	
Geoffrey	Rob		
Meryl	Rob		
