= Nia Misikea =

Niuean track and field athlete

Personal information
- Full name: Misinia Billy Tui Misikea
- Nationality: Niuean
- Born: 27 December 1993 (age 32) Auckland, New Zealand
- Height: 1.78 m (5 ft 10 in)
- Weight: 102 kg (225 lb)

Sport
- Country: Niue
- Sport: Track and field
- Events: Shot put, Javelin

Achievements and titles
- Personal best: Shotput - 12.13 m (NR) Javelin 53.91 m (NR)

Nia Misikea (born 27 December 1993 in Auckland, New Zealand) is a Niuean track and field athlete who specializes in shot put and javelin. He competed for Niue at the 2014 Commonwealth Games in the men's javelin throw and the 2018 Commonwealth Games in the men's shot put and men's javelin throw. At the 2014 Commonwealth Games, Misikea threw a distance of 47.95 metres and finished 22nd of 22 athletes that competed, his fellow athlete Ikipa Misikea came 21st and set a new national records of 51.68 metres, neither of them qualified for the final. This national records Nia Misikea broke later at the 2017 Pacific Mini Games with a distance of 53.91 metres. At the 2018 Commonwealth Games, Misikea competed in men's shot put and men's javelin throw along with Loe Kaufisi. In both events, Misikea beat Kaufisi but in both events they finished below all of the other competitors. Misikea did however, set a new national record in the shot put after he registered a 12.13 metre put, he still finished 3.69 metres behind the next closest athlete, Mustafa Fall from Fiji and did not qualify to the final. In the javelin throw, his best throw was 47.73 metres, this finished him 5.11 metres behind the next closest competitor, Imo Fiamalua from Tuvalu and didn't qualify for the final once again.
