= Ravinder Singh Khaira =

Indian javelin thrower

Personal information
- Nationality: India
- Born: 19 March 1986 (age 40) Rampura, Bathinda, Punjab, India
- Height: 192 cm (6 ft 4 in)
- Weight: 108 kg (238 lb)

Sport
- Sport: Track and field
- Event: Javelin throw

Achievements and titles
- Personal best: 79.04(Lucknow 2016)
- Updated on 22 July 2014

Ravinder Singh Khaira (born 19 March 1986) is an Indian javelin thrower. He is representing India at the 2014 Commonwealth Games in Glasgow, Scotland.

== Early life ==
Ravinder Singh Khaira was born on 19 March 1986 in Rampura, in the Bhatinda district of Punjab, India. His father Hardeep Singh Khaira is a physical education teacher who played a major role in his son taking up sports as a career option. He took up volleyball initially and competed in state and national championships. However, in 2005, Ravinder opted for javelin throw and began training. In 2008, he moved to Melbourne, Australia, for training under better facilities and got himself enrolled in the Victoria Institute of Sports. He simultaneously worked as a part-time taxi driver doing his Diploma in Automotives.

== Career ==
In Australia, Khaira won the Victorian Javelin Throw Championship twice. After having secured gold in the 2013 National open athletics championship in Ranchi, he was named in the core list of athletes for the 2014 Commonwealth Games and the 2014 Asian Games. In the same year, he achieved his career best of 78.02 meters, in the National inter-state meet in Lucknow.
