= Jean-Paul Lakafia =

French javelin thrower (born 1961)

Personal information
- Born: 29 June 1961 (age 65) Nouméa, New Caledonia
- Height: 1.92 m (6 ft 3 1/2 in)
- Weight: 103 kg (227 lb) (1984 Olympics)

Sport
- Country: France
- Sport: Athletics
- Event: Javelin

Achievements and titles
- Olympic finals: 12th (1984 Olympics)
- Regional finals: 1st (Jeux de la Francophonie)
- Personal best: 86.60 m (1985)
Medal record
Men's athletics
Representing New Caledonia
(South) Pacific Games
Gold medal – first place	1991 Port Moresby	Javelin throw
Gold medal – first place	1987 Nouméa	Javelin throw
Gold medal – first place	1983 Apia	Javelin throw
Gold medal – first place	1979 Suva	Javelin throw
Silver medal – second place	1983 Apia	Decathlon
Representing France
Summer Universiade
Bronze medal – third place	1985 Kobe	Javelin throw
- Updated on 26 April 2013

Jean-Paul Lakafia (born 29 June 1961) is a retired male javelin thrower from France; he was born in Nouméa, New Caledonia. He competed at the 1984 Summer Olympics in Los Angeles, California, finishing in 12th place. He set his personal best (86.60 metres) in 1985.

== Achievements ==
Year	Competition	Venue	Position	Event	Notes
Representing France
1984	Olympic Games	Los Angeles, United States	12th	Javelin throw	70.86 m
1989	Jeux de la Francophonie	Casablanca, Morocco	1st	Javelin throw	73.38 m
Representing New Caledonia
1979	South Pacific Games	Suva, Fiji	1st	Javelin throw	64.44 m
1983	South Pacific Games	Apia, Western Samoa	1st	Javelin throw	84.74 m GR (old design)
1983	South Pacific Games	Apia, Western Samoa	2nd	Decathlon	5835 pts
1987	South Pacific Games	Nouméa, New Caledonia	1st	Javelin throw	78.96 m GR (current design)
1991	South Pacific Games	Port Moresby, Papua New Guinea	1st	Javelin throw	77.12 m

== Family ==
Lakafia has a daughter Chanelle and two sons, Pierre-Gilles and Raphaël, who are both French rugby union players.
