= Pierre Hervé Ateme Elanga =

Cameroonian footballer

Personal information
- Date of birth: 25 September 1986 (age 40)
- Place of birth: Yaoundé, Cameroon
- Height: 1.80 m (5 ft 11 in)
- Position: Forward

Youth career
- 2002–2003: Union d'Abong-Mbang
- 2003–2004: Tonnerre Yaoundé

Senior career*
Years	Team	Apps	(Gls)
2004–2009	FC Foudre Akonolinga		
2009–2010	DAC Dunajská Streda	4	(0)
2010	Bafia Club		
2011	Namur		
2011–2012	Cosmos de Bafia		
2013	Küçük Kaymaklı Türk SK		
- * Club domestic league appearances and goals

Pierre Hervé Ateme Elanga (born 25 September 1986) is a Cameroonian former professional footballer who played as a forward.

== Career ==
Born in Yaoundé, he played 2005 for the Cameroonian U17 and 2008 for the U23 of Cameroon. He played from 2004 to 2009 for FC Foudre.

He played four games for the Slovak side Dunajská Streda in 2009.

In June 2011, he moved to Belgium signing for UR Namur. After four months, he left Belgium and returned to Cameroon, to sign for Cosmos de Bafia. In January 2013, he returned to Europe and signed for North Cyprus side Küçük Kaymaklı Türk SK.
