= Pierre-Gilles Lakafia =

French rugby union player

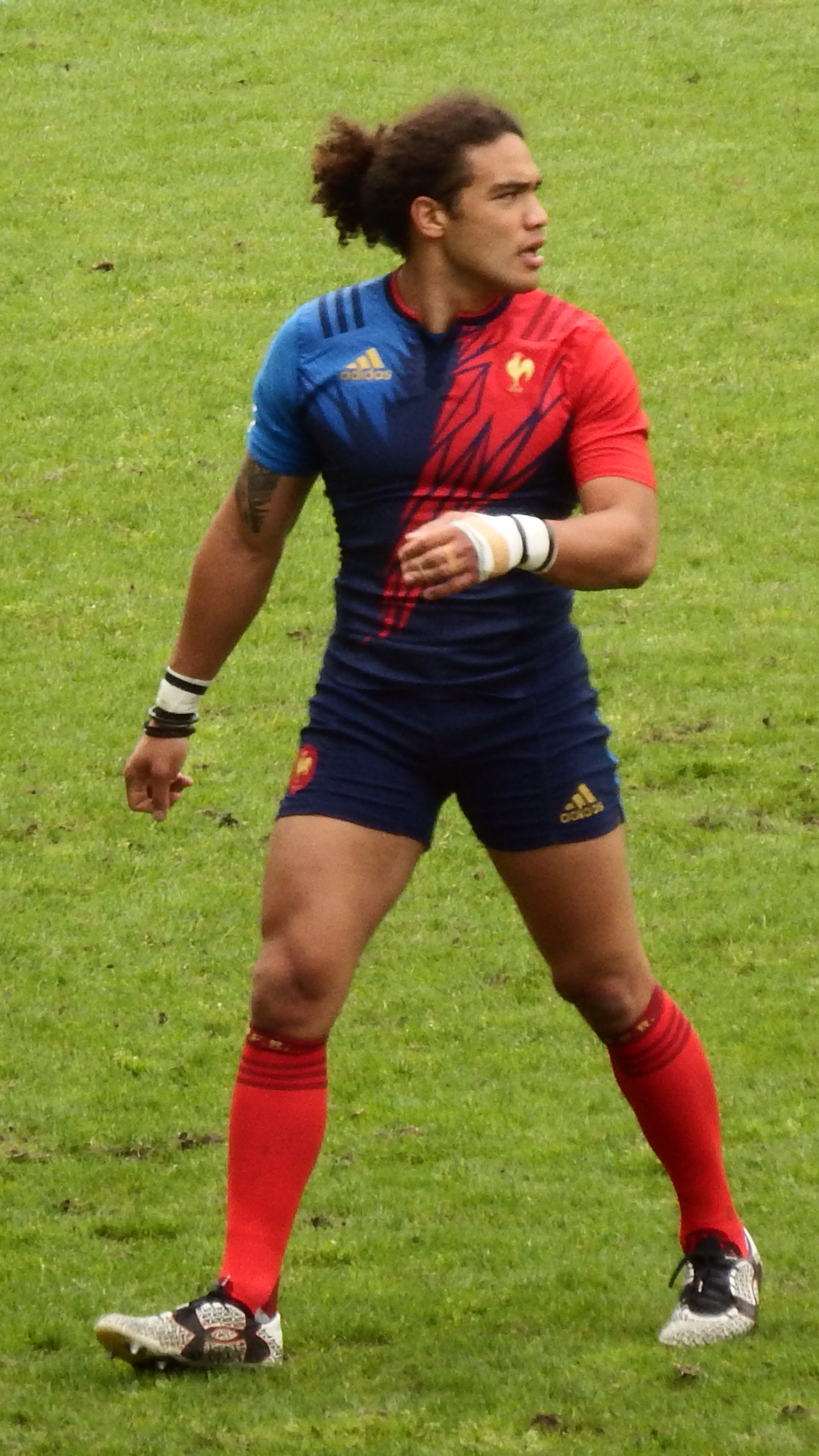
- Born: 13 March 1987 (age 39) Tours, Indre-et-Loire, France
- Height: 1.86 m (6 ft 1 in)
- Weight: 95 kg (209 lb)

Rugby union career
- Position: Wing
Senior career
Years	Team	Apps	(Points)
2006-2008	Grenoble	3	(0)
2008-2010	Albi	56	(30)
2010-2012	Toulouse	2	(0)
2012-2014	Castres	18	(10)
National sevens team
Years	Team		Comps
2011	France 7s		IRB 7s Series

Pierre-Gilles Lakafia (born 13 March 1987 in Tours, Indre-et-Loire, France) is a French rugby union player. He plays at Wing for Castres. He is the brother of Biarritz Olympique Number 8, Rafaël Lakafia and the son of former French javelin champion Jean-Paul Lakafia, and his mother was a discus thrower. His father is originally from Wallis and Futuna. He was a member of the French sevens team playing at the 2011 Hong Kong Sevens.
