= Raphaël Lakafia =

France international rugby union player (born 1988)

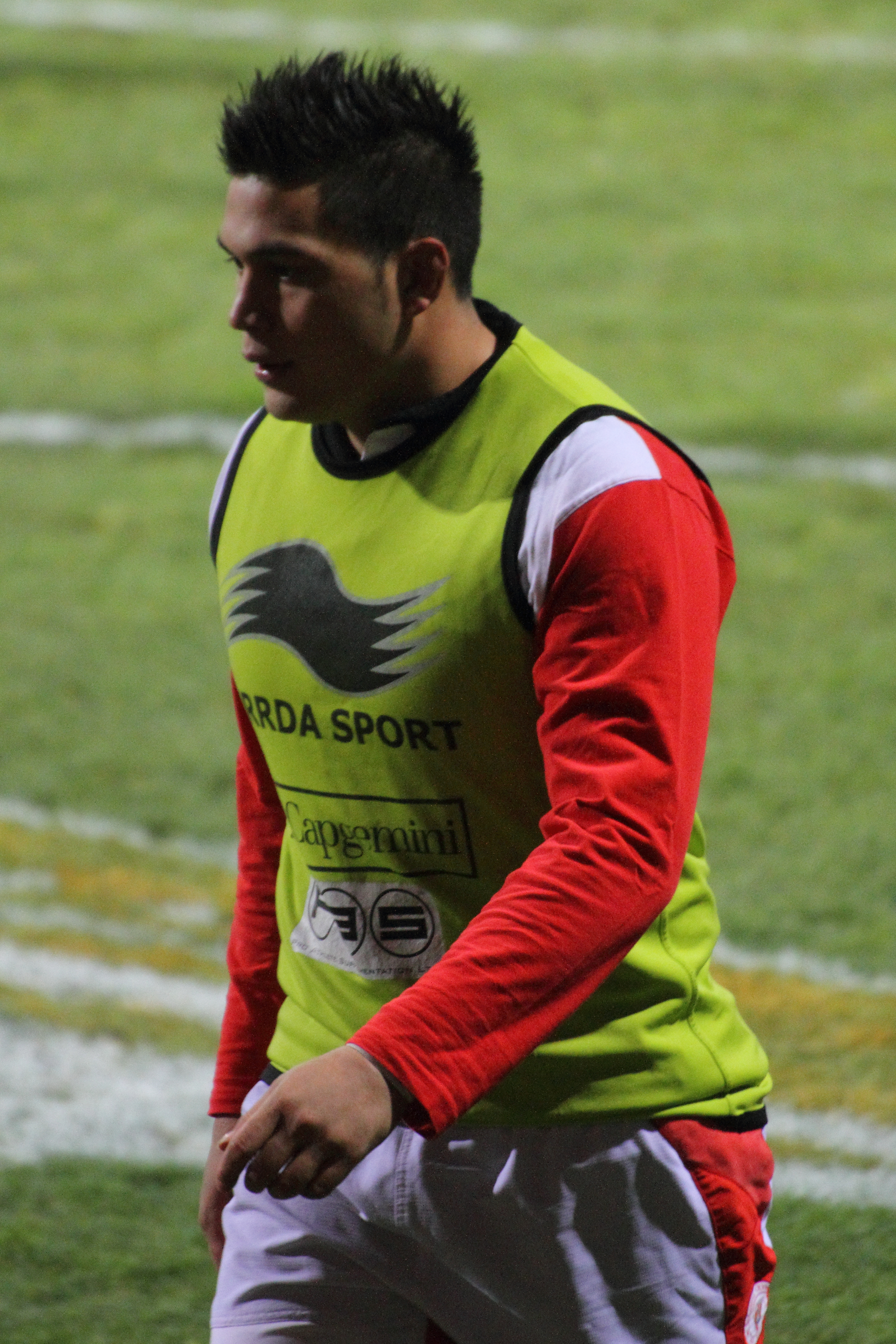
- Raphaël Lakafia before a match between Stade toulousain and Biarritz, 2013.
- Born: Raphaël Lakafia; 28 October 1988 (age 38) France
- Height: 1.91 m (6 ft 3 in)
- Weight: 114 kg (17 st 13 lb; 251 lb)

Rugby union career
- Position(s): No.8, Flanker
- Current team: Toulon
Senior career
Years	Team	Apps	(Points)
2007–2009	Grenoble	26	(5)
2009–2014	Biarritz	86	(30)
2014–2017	Stade Français	68	(50)
2017–present	Toulon	115	(45)
- Correct as of 17 February 2018
International career
Years	Team	Apps	(Points)
2008	France U20	5	(15)
2011–2016	France	4	(0)
- Correct as of 20 June 2016

Raphaël Lakafia (born 28 October 1988) is a French rugby union player. He currently plays for Toulon and plays at the Number 8 position. He is the younger brother of Pierre-Gilles Lakafia and son of former French javelin champion Jean-Paul Lakafia.

Lakafia played for France in the 2008 IRB Junior World Championship and scored three tries against Japan. He played at the 2011 Rugby World Cup for France. He played twice during the tournament against Japan and Tonga.
