= Athletics at the 2023 African Games – Men's javelin throw =

Men's javelin throw at the 2023 African Games
- Venue: Legon Sports Stadium
- Location: Accra, Ghana
- Dates: 22 March
- Competitors: 12 from 7 nations
- Winning distance: 82.80 m NR

Medalists
gold medal	Nnamdi Chinecherem	Nigeria
silver medal	Julius Yego	Kenya
bronze medal	Mustafa Mahmoud Abdel Khaliq	Egypt

The men's javelin throw event at the 2023 African Games was held on 22 March 2024 in Accra, Ghana.

== Results ==
Held on 22 March

Rank	Name	Nationality	#1	#2	#3	#4	#5	#6	Result	Notes
1st place, gold medalist(s)	Nnamdi Chinecherem	Nigeria	82.80	79.08	75.81	77.37	73.69	—	82.80	NR
2nd place, silver medalist(s)	Julius Yego	Kenya	76.33	77.08	78.82	x	81.74	81.15	81.74	
3rd place, bronze medalist(s)	Mustafa Mahmoud Abdel Khaliq	Egypt	74.21	78.10	74.14	74.24	71.41	76.26	78.10	
4	Ihab Abdelrahman	Egypt	76.68	74.62	x	74.40	x	x	76.68	
5	Samuel Kure	Nigeria	69.85	69.60	x	69.08	69.11	76.28	76.28	
6	Alexander Kiprotich	Kenya	69.58	75.45	73.11	71.38	69.55	x	75.45	
7	Otag Ubang	Ethiopia	x	70.62	73.84	69.11	73.35	68.08	73.84	NR
8	Jamis Aballa	Ethiopia	65.28	69.61	68.38	68.81	x	x	69.61	
9	John Ampomah	Ghana	66.64	x	60.92				66.64	
10	Ignace Chancel Ebana	Republic of the Congo	53.98	65.88	62.79				65.88	
11	Romaric Houenou	Benin	x	63.37	57.15				63.37	
12	Okello Othow Ojulu	Ethiopia	61.10	62.24	62.42				62.42	
	Samuel Osadolor	Nigeria							DNS	
	Emeka Nmesirronye	Nigeria							DNS	
