= Elanga Buala =

Papua New Guinean athlete (1964–2021)

Personal information
- Nationality: Papua New Guinean
- Born: 21 May 1964 Lae, Papua New Guinea
- Died: 7 January 2021 (aged 56) Butibam, Papua New Guinea

Sport
- Sport: Sprinting
- Event(s): 200 metres, 400 metres
Medal record
Women's Athletics
Representing Papua New Guinea
Pacific Games
Gold medal – first place	1983 Apia	200 m
Gold medal – first place	1983 Apia	400 m
Gold medal – first place	1983 Apia	4 × 400 m relay
Silver medal – second place	1983 Apia	4 × 100 m relay
Bronze medal – third place	1983 Apia	800 m
Pacific Mini Games
Gold medal – first place	1981 Honiara	4 × 400 m relay
Silver medal – second place	1981 Honiara	400 m
Bronze medal – third place	1981 Honiara	200 m

Elanga Buala (21 May 1964 – 7 January 2021) was a sprinter from Papua New Guinea. She competed in the women's 200 metres at the 1984 Summer Olympics in Los Angeles, United States.
