= Charlie Oliver (athlete) =

Solomon Islands middle-distance runner

Personal information
- Full name: Charlie Oliver
- Nationality: Solomon Islands
- Born: July 9, 1955 (age 71)
- Height: 1.85 m (6 ft 1 in)
- Weight: 65 kg (143 lb)

Sport
- Sport: Athletics
- Events: 800 metres & 1500 metres
Medal record
Men's athletics
Representing Solomon Islands
(South) Pacific Mini Games
| Gold medal – first place | 1981 Honiara | 800 m |
| Silver medal – second place | 1981 Honiara | 1500 m |
| Silver medal – second place | 1985 Rarotonga | 800 m |
- Updated on 17 May 2015

Charles Oliver (born 9 July 1955) is a retired middle-distance athlete from the Solomon Islands.

Oliver was part of the Solomon Island team that was first to compete at the Olympics when they went to the 1984 Summer Olympics which was held in Los Angeles. He entered the 800 metres, he managed to finish sixth in his heat, but did not advance to the next round.

== Achievements ==
| Year | Competition | Venue | Position | Event | Notes |
Representing Solomon Islands
| 1981 | South Pacific Mini Games | Honiara, Solomon Islands | 1st | 800 m | 1:56.01 min |
| 1981 | South Pacific Mini Games | Honiara, Solomon Islands | 2nd | 1500 m | 4:07.71 min |
| 1985 | South Pacific Mini Games | Rarotonga, Cook Islands | 2nd | 800 m | 1:57.44 min |
