= Inoke Bainimoli =

Fijian sprinter (born 1958)

Personal information
- Nationality: Fijian
- Born: 18 September 1958 (age 67)

Sport
- Sport: Sprinting
- Event: 100 metres

Inoke Bainimoli (born 18 September 1958) is a Fijian sprinter. He competed in the men's 100 metres at the 1984 Summer Olympics.
