= Lapule Tamean =

Papua New Guinean sprinter

Lapule Tamean OLY
Personal information
- Nationality: Papua New Guinean
- Born: 17 September 1962 (age 63)

Sport
- Sport: Sprinting
- Event: 200 metres

Lapule Tamean (born 17 September 1962) is a Papua New Guinean sprinter. He competed in the men's 200 metres at the 1984 Summer Olympics.
