= Alain Lazare =

French long-distance runner

Personal information
- Nationality: French
- Born: 23 March 1952 (age 73) Nouméa, New Caledonia

Sport
- Sport: Long-distance running
- Event: Marathon

Alain Lazare (born 23 March 1952) is a French long-distance runner. He competed in the marathon at the 1984 Summer Olympics and the 1988 Summer Olympics. On 27 January 1985 he won the Hong Kong Marathon with a time of 2:18:34.
