= List of 2023–24 Top 14 transfers =

2022–23 Top 14 transfers

This is a list of player transfers involving Top 14 teams before or during the 2023–24 season. The list is of deals that are confirmed and are either from or to a rugby union team in the Top 14 during the 2022–23 season. It is not unknown for confirmed deals to be cancelled at a later date.

== Bayonne ==
=== Players In ===
- (France) Arthur Iturria from (France) Clermont
- (Fiji) Luke Tagi from (France) Provence
- (France) Vincent Guidicelli from (France) Montpellier
- (Italy) Federico Mori from (France) Bordeaux
- (France) Remi Bourdeau from (France) La Rochelle
- (Australia) Reece Hodge from (Australia) Melbourne Rebels
- (Georgia (country)) Gela Aprasidze from (France) Montpellier
- (France) Aurelien Callandret from (France) Oyonnax
- (France) Cheikh Tiberghien from (France) Clermont
- (Argentina) Rodrigo Bruni from (France) Brive
- (Argentina) Lucas Paulos from (France) Brive
- (Fiji) Api Ratuniyarawa from (England) London Irish (short-term deal)
- (France) Nadir Megdoud from (France) Stade Français
- (Argentina) Mateo Carreras from (England) Newcastle Falcons

=== Players Out ===
- (France) Arthur Duhau to (France) Bordeaux
- (Australia) Chris Talakai to (France) Mont-de-Marsan
- (France) Yann David to (France) Biarritz
- (New Zealand) Geoff Cridge to (New Zealand) Hawke's Bay
- (Namibia) Torsten van Jaarsveld to (France) Mont-de-Marsan
- (New Zealand) Jason Robertson to (United States) Old Glory DC
- (Samoa) Olajuwon Noa to (United States) New Orleans Gold
- (France) Peyo Muscarditz to (France) Agen

== Bordeaux ==
=== Players In ===
- (France) Damian Penaud from (France) Clermont
- (France) Paul Abadie from (France) Brive
- (France) Romain Latterade from (France) Mont-de-Marsan
- (Japan) Tevita Tatafu from (Japan) Tokyo Sungoliath
- (France) Alexandre Ricard from (France) Colomiers
- (South Africa) Carlü Sadie from (South Africa) Sharks
- (Australia) Ben Tapuai from (South Africa) Sharks
- (Australia) Pete Samu from (Australia) Brumbies
- (Tonga) Adam Coleman from (England) London Irish
- (France) Arthur Duhau from (France) Bayonne (short-term deal)
- (France) Raphaël Lakafia from (France) Toulon (short-term deal)
- (France) Marko Gazzotti from (France) Grenoble
- (France) Theo Nanette from (France) Rouen
- (Tonga) Toma'akino Taufa from (France) Tarbes

=== Players Out ===
- (Italy) Federico Mori to (France) Bayonne
- (France) Jules Gimbert to (France) Stade Français
- (England) Tom Willis to (England) Saracens
- (Argentina) Pablo Dimcheff to (France) Colomiers
- (France) Alban Roussel to (France) Lyon
- (Argentina) Santiago Cordero to (Ireland) Connacht
- (England) Gabriel Oghre to (England) Bristol Bears
- (France) Rémi Lamerat retired
- (Fiji) Petero Mailulu to (France) Béziers
- (France) Geoffrey Cros to (France) Grenoble
- (France) Corentin Coularis to (France) Montauban
- (France) Hugo Zabalza to (France) Stade Français
- (France) Christopher Vaotoa to (France) Oyonnax
- (Australia) Caleb Timu to (France) Clermont
- (Italy) Renato Giammarioli to (Italy) Fiamme Oro
- (France) Raphaël Lakafia retired
- (France) Jean-Baptiste Dubie to (Australia) Manly
- (France) Arthur Duhau to (France) Périgueux

== Castres ==
=== Players In ===
- (France) Loris Zarantonello from (France) Agen
- (France) Pierre Popelin from (France) La Rochelle
- (France) Nathanaël Hulleu from (France) Vannes
- (France) Yann Peysson from (France) Colomiers
- (New Zealand) Abraham Papali'i from (France) Brive
- (France) Romain Macurdy from (France) Montpellier
- (New Zealand) Jack Goodhue from (New Zealand) Crusaders
- (Wales) Henry Thomas from (France) Montpellier

=== Players Out ===
- (France) Thomas Larregain to (France) Montauban
- (France) Theo Hannoyer to (France) Provence
- (France) Julien Blanc to (France) Brive
- (Argentina) Benjamin Urdapilleta to (France) Clermont
- (France) Brice Humbert to (France) Valence Romans
- (France) Dorian Clerc to (France) Mazamet
- (France) Kevin Kornath to (France) Oyonnax
- (France) Brendan Lebrun to (France) Biarritz
- (France) Rory Kockott to (France) Stade Français
- (New Zealand) Teariki Ben-Nicholas to (Japan) Kurita Water Gush Akishima
- (Tonga) Paula Ngauamo to (France) Limoges
- (Spain) Asier Usarraga to (France) Brive

== Clermont ==
=== Players In ===
- (New Zealand) Pita Gus Sowakula from (New Zealand) Chiefs
- (Australia) Folau Fainga'a from (Australia) Western Force
- (Argentina) Marcos Kremer from (France) Stade Français
- (Australia) Rob Simmons from (England) London Irish
- (France) Alfred Parisien from (France) Lyon
- (New Zealand) Chris Gabriel from (New Zealand) Massey
- (France) Enzo Sanga from (France) Brive
- (Argentina) Benjamin Urdapilleta from (France) Castres
- (France) Joris Jurand from (France) Brive
- (France) Pierre Fouyssac from (France) Toulouse
- (Australia) Caleb Timu from (France) Bordeaux (short-term deal)

=== Players Out ===
- (France) Damian Penaud to (France) Bordeaux
- (France) Arthur Iturria to (France) Bayonne
- (France) Adrien Pélissié to (France) Brive
- (France) Judicaël Cancoriet to (France) La Rochelle
- (France) Valentin Simutoga to (France) Lyon
- (France) Cheikh Tiberghien to (France) Bayonne
- (France) Sebastien Vahaamahina retired
- (Fiji) Apisai Naqalevu to (France) Perpignan
- (France) Jean-Pascal Barraque to (France) Perpignan
- (South Africa) Jacobus van Tonder to (France) Perpignan
- (New Zealand) Edward Annandale to (New Zealand) Blues
- (France) Loïc Godener to (France) Oyonnax
- (Spain) Samuel Ezeala to (France) Pau
- (Australia) Miles Amatosero to (Australia) Waratahs

== La Rochelle ==
=== Players In ===
- (France) Teddy Iribaren from (France) Racing 92
- (New Zealand) Ihaia West from (France) Toulon
- (France) Judicaël Cancoriet from (France) Clermont
- (England) Jack Nowell from (England) Exeter Chiefs
- (Fiji) Akuila Tabualevu from (France) Valence Romans (short-term deal)
- (Australia) Billy Pollard from (Australia) Brumbies (short-term deal)
- (Australia) Archer Holz from (Australia) NSW Waratahs (short-term deal)

=== Players Out ===
- (France) Pierre Popelin to (France) Castres
- (France) Remi Bourdeau to (France) Bayonne
- (France) Pierre Boudehent to (France) Stade Français
- (South Africa) Kyle Hatherell to (England) Leicester Tigers
- (France) Samuel Lagrange to (France) Mont-de-Marsan
- (France) Jules Le Bail to (France) Vannes
- (England) Harry Glynn to (France) Béziers
- (France) Romain Sazy retired
- (France) Leo Aouf to (France) Montauban
- (Spain) Martín Alonso to (France) Vannes
- (England) Hayden Thompson-Stringer to (France) Pau
- (France) Victor Olivier to (France) Montauban
- (France) Thibault Rabourdin to (France) Périgueux
- (Fiji) Akuila Tabalevu to (France) Soyaux Angoulême

== Lyon ==
=== Players In ===
- (France) Alban Roussel from (France) Bordeaux
- (Italy) Martin Page-Relo from (France) Toulouse
- (France) Pierre-Samuel Pacheco from (France) Colomiers
- (France) Valentin Simutoga from (France) Clermont
- (Fiji) Semi Radradra from (England) Bristol Bears
- (South Africa) Thaakir Abrahams from (South Africa) Sharks
- (France) Vincent Rattez from (France) Montpellier
- (Italy) Monty Ioane from (Australia) Melbourne Rebels
- (Ireland) Paddy Jackson from (England) London Irish
- (France) Pierre Pages from (France) Carcassonne (short-term deal)
- (Australia) Joe Powell from (England) Leicester Tigers

=== Players Out ===
- (Fiji) Josua Tuisova to (France) Racing 92
- (Fiji) Temo Mayanavanua to (England) Northampton Saints
- (France) Alfred Parisien to (France) Clermont
- (France) Ethan Clusel to (France) Oyonnax
- (France) Nathan Farissier to (France) Grenoble (season-long loan)
- (Fiji) Tavite Veredamu to (France) Perpignan
- (France) Jonathan Pélissié retired
- (France) Patrick Sobela to (France) Perpignan
- (New Zealand) Lima Sopoaga to (Japan) Shimizu Koto Blue Sharks
- (Fiji) Noa Nakaitaci to (France) Toulon
- (France) Pierre Pages to (France) Biarritz
- (Argentina) Francisco Gómez Kodela to (France) Stade Français

== Montpellier ==
=== Players In ===
- (England) Sam Simmonds from (England) Exeter Chiefs
- (Georgia (country)) Lasha Macharashvili from (France) Mont-de-Marsan
- (England) Harry Williams from (England) Exeter Chiefs
- (France) Alexandre de Nardi from (France) Mont-de-Marsan
- (Australia) Tolu Latu from (Australia) NSW Waratahs
- (France) Auguste Cadot from (France) Biarritz
- (France) Baptiste Erdocio from (France) Biarritz
- (Georgia (country)) Luka Japaridze from (France) Brive
- (France) Benoît Paillaugue from (France) Toulon (short-term deal)
- (Samoa) Logovi'i Mulipola from (England) Newcastle Falcons (short-term deal)
- (Georgia (country)) Vano Karkadze from (France) Brive
- (Scotland) D'Arcy Rae from (England) Bath (short-term deal)
- (France) Christopher Tolofua from (France) Toulon

=== Players Out ===
- (England) Zach Mercer to (England) Gloucester
- (France) Vincent Guidicelli to (France) Bayonne
- (England) Curtis Langdon to (England) Northampton Saints
- (Georgia (country)) Gela Aprasidze to (France) Bayonne
- (France) Vincent Rattez to (France) Lyon
- (France) Romain Macurdy to (France) Castres
- (France) Mohamed Haouas to (France) Biarritz
- (France) Yvan Reilhac to (France) Montauban
- (France) Jérémie Maurouard to (France) Perpignan
- (Scotland) D'Arcy Rae to (Scotland) Edinburgh
- (France) Benoît Paillaugue retired
- (Samoa) Logovi'i Mulipola to (England) Saracens
- (Wales) Henry Thomas to (France) Castres
- (France) Martin Doan to (France) Bourgoin-Jallieu
- (Italy) Paolo Garbisi to (France) Toulon

== Oyonnax ==
=== Players In ===
- (France) Maxime Salles from (France) Montauban
- (Argentina) Lucas Mensa from (France) Mont-de-Marsan
- (France) Ali Oz from (France) Racing 92
- (Scotland) Ewan Johnson from (France) Vannes
- (France) Ethan Clusel from (France) Lyon
- (France) Christopher Vaotoa from (France) Bordeaux
- (France) Kevin Kornath from (France) Castres
- (New Zealand) Jonathan Ruru from (France) Provence
- (France) Daniel Ikpefan from (France) Pau
- (France) Loïc Godener from (France) Clermont
- (Argentina) Domingo Miotti from (Scotland) Glasgow Warriors
- (Tonga) Leva Fifita from (Ireland) Connacht
- (Scotland) Rory Sutherland from (Ireland) Ulster
- (Georgia (country)) Vasil Lobzhanidze from (France) Toulon

=== Players Out ===
- (France) Jeremy Gondrand to (France) Bourgoin
- (France) Paul Gadea to (France) Hyères
- (France) Aurelien Callandret to (France) Bayonne
- (France) Thomas Laclayat to (France) Racing 92
- (France) Florian Vialelle retired
- (France) Gabriel Favier to (France) Mâcon
- (Fiji) Gabiriele Lovobalavu to (France) Bourgoin
- (Australia) Tom Murday to (France) Stade Niçois
- (France) Victor Delmas to (France) Blagnac
- (Tonga) Leva Fifita to (France) Narbonne

== Pau ==
=== Players In ===
- (France) Mehdi Tlili from (France) Massy
- (England) Joe Simmonds from (England) Exeter Chiefs
- (New Zealand) Sam Whitelock from (New Zealand) Crusaders
- (Spain) Samuel Ezeala from (France) Clermont
- (England) Hayden Thompson-Stringer from (France) La Rochelle (short-term deal)
- (Argentina) Facundo Gigena from (England) London Irish

=== Players Out ===
- (England) Zack Henry to (France) Stade Français
- (France) Vincent Pinto to (France) Colomiers
- (France) Clovis Le Bail to (France) Racing 92
- (Ireland) Eoghan Barrett to (France) Soyaux Angoulême
- (France) Daniel Ikpefan to (France) Oyonnax
- (England) Hayden Thompson-Stringer to (Australia) Waratahs

== Perpignan ==
=== Players In ===
- (Italy) Tommaso Allan from (England) Harlequins
- (Fiji) Tavite Veredamu from (France) Lyon
- (Fiji) Apisai Naqalevu from (France) Clermont
- (South Africa) Nemo Roelofse from (France) Stade Français
- (Italy) Pietro Ceccarelli from (France) Brive
- (France) Jean-Pascal Barraque from (France) Clermont
- (South Africa) Jaco van Tonder from (France) Clermont
- (France) Patrick Sobela from (France) Lyon
- (Samoa) So'otala Fa'aso'o from (England) London Irish
- (Italy) Alessandro Ortombina from (Italy) Valorugby Emilia
- (South Africa) Marvin Orie from (South Africa) Stormers
- (France) Louis Dupichot from (France) Racing 92
- (France) Jérémie Maurouard from (France) Montpellier (short-term deal)
- (Argentina) Ignacio Ruiz from (England) London Irish
- (France) Mathieu Tanguy from (France) Toulon

=== Players Out ===
- (Argentina) Patricio Fernández to (France) Mont-de-Marsan
- (England) Brad Shields to (New Zealand) Hurricanes
- (South Africa) Tristan Tedder to (France) Racing 92
- (Portugal) Mike Tadjer retired
- (Moldova) Andrei Mahu to (France) Massy
- (England) Will Witty to (France) Rouen
- (Tonga) Ma'afu Fia to (France) Bourg-en-Bresse
- (France) Dorian Laborde to (France) Colomiers
- (Tonga) Siua Halanukonuka to (France) Grenoble
- (Samoa) Genesis Mamea Lemalu to (France) Dax
- (New Zealand) George Tilsley to (France) Agen
- (France) Jérémie Maurouard to (France) Rouen
- (Samoa) Piula Faʻasalele to (France) Toulouse
- (Georgia (country)) Nodar Shengelia to (France) Aurillac

== Racing 92 ==
=== Players In ===
- (Fiji) Wame Naituvi from (France) Mont-de-Marsan
- (France) Thomas Laclayat from (France) Oyonnax
- (Fiji) Josua Tuisova from (France) Lyon
- (South Africa) James Hall from (France) Stade Français
- (Wales) Will Rowlands from (Wales) Dragons
- (South Africa) Siya Kolisi from (South Africa) Sharks
- (South Africa) Tristian Tedder from (France) Perpignan
- (France) Clovis Le Bail from (France) Pau
- (England) Henry Arundell from (England) London Irish
- (Wales) WillGriff John from (Wales) Scarlets (short-term deal)

=== Players Out ===
- (France) Teddy Iribaren to (France) La Rochelle
- (Scotland) Finn Russell to (England) Bath
- (Namibia) Anton Bresler to (France) Vannes
- (France) Jonathan Maiau to (France) Nevers
- (France) Ali Oz to (France) Oyonnax
- (Fiji) Asaeli Tuivuaka to (France) Brive
- (France) Louis Dupichot to (France) Perpignan
- (England) Biyi Alo to (England) Ealing Trailfinders
- (South Africa) Warrick Gelant to (South Africa) Stormers
- (Fiji) Ben Volavola to (France) Agen
- (Wales) WillGriff John to (France) Montauban

== Stade Français ==
=== Players In ===
- (France) Pierre Boudehent from (France) La Rochelle
- (France) Jules Gimbert from (France) Bordeaux
- (England) Joe Marchant from (England) Harlequins
- (Tonga) Tanginoa Halaifonua from (France) Grenoble
- (France) Hugo Zabalza from (France) Bordeaux
- (England) Zack Henry from (France) Pau
- (New Zealand) Brad Weber from (New Zealand) Chiefs
- (France) Rory Kockott from (France) Castres (short-term deal)
- (Argentina) Francisco Gómez Kodela from (France) Lyon

=== Players Out ===
- (South Africa) Nemo Roelofse to (France) Perpignan
- (France) Morgan Parra retired
- (South Africa) James Hall to (France) Racing 92
- (Argentina) Marcos Kremer to (France) Clermont
- (France) Alex Arrate to (France) Vannes
- (New Zealand) Sione Tui to (France) Provence
- (South Africa) Vincent Koch to (South Africa) Sharks
- (France) Arthur Coville to (France) Provence
- (Tonga) Sitaleki Timani to (France) Brive
- (Tonga) Telusa Veainu to (England) Sale Sharks
- (France) Theo Dachary to (France) Dax
- (Italy) Paolo Odogwu to (Italy) Benetton
- (France) Nadir Megdoud to (France) Bayonne

== Toulon ==
=== Players In ===
- (France) Selevasio Tolofua from (France) Toulouse
- (England) David Ribbans from (England) Northampton Saints
- (France) Yannick Youyoutte from (France) Toulouse
- (France) Enzo Herve from (France) Brive
- (France) Esteban Abadie from (France) Brive
- (New Zealand) Leicester Fainga'anuku from (New Zealand) Crusaders
- (Scotland) Ben White from (England) London Irish
- (Fiji) Noa Nakaitaci from (France) Lyon (short-term deal)
- (Fiji) Setariki Tuicuvu from (France) Brive (short-term deal)
- (Wales) Alun Wyn Jones from (Wales) Ospreys (short-term deal)
- (Australia) Noah Lolesio from (Australia) ACT Brumbies (short-term deal)
- (England) Micky Young from (England) Newcastle Falcons (short-term deal)
- (France) Melvyn Jaminet from (France) Toulouse
- (England) Jack Singleton from (England) Gloucester (season-long loan)
- (Italy) Paolo Garbisi from (France) Montpellier

=== Players Out ===
- (Italy) Sergio Parisse retired
- (France) Thomas Salles to (France) Provence
- (Romania) Atila Septar to (France) Provence
- (New Zealand) Ihaia West to (France) La Rochelle
- (France) Mathieu Bastareaud retired
- (France) Benoît Paillaugue to (France) Montpellier
- (South Africa) Cheslin Kolbe to (Japan) Tokyo Sungoliath
- (France) Raphaël Lakafia to (France) Bordeaux
- (France) Florian Fresia retired
- (England) Micky Young to (England) Gloucester
- (France) Mathieu Tanguy to (France) Perpignan
- (Fiji) Noa Nakaitaci to (France) Limoges
- (France) Christopher Tolofua to (France) Montpellier
- (Georgia (country)) Vasil Lobzhanidze to (France) Oyonnax

== Toulouse ==
=== Players In ===
- (New Zealand) Nepo Laulala from (New Zealand) Blues
- (Fiji) Setareki Bituniyata from (France) Brive
- (Japan) Kakeru Okumura from (Japan) Shizuoka Blue Revs (short-term deal)
- (England) Billy Searle from (England) Bath (short-term deal)
- (New Zealand) Owen Franks from (New Zealand) Hurricanes (short-term deal)
- (Samoa) Piula Faʻasalele from (France) Perpignan
- (Scotland) Blair Kinghorn from (Scotland) Edinburgh

=== Players Out ===
- (Samoa) Charlie Faumuina retired
- (France) Martin Page-Relo to (France) Lyon
- (France) Selevasio Tolofua to (France) Toulon
- (France) Yannick Youyoutte to (France) Toulon
- (France) Pierre Fouyssac to (France) Clermont
- (Samoa) Tim Nanai-Williams to (France) Béziers
- (England) Billy Searle to (France) Biarritz
- (France) Melvyn Jaminet to (France) Toulon
- (New Zealand) Owen Franks to (New Zealand) Crusaders

== See also ==
- List of 2023–24 Premiership Rugby transfers
- List of 2023–24 United Rugby Championship transfers
- List of 2023–24 Super Rugby transfers
- List of 2023–24 RFU Championship transfers
- List of 2023–24 Rugby Pro D2 transfers
- List of 2023–24 Major League Rugby transfers
