= End of the Middle =

Studio album by Richard Dawson
- Released: 14 February 2025
- Recorded: 2024
- Length: 49:14
- Labels: Weird World; Domino
- Producers: Richard Dawson; Sam Grant

Richard Dawson chronology
The Ruby Cord (2022)	End of the Middle (2025)

Singles from End of the Middle
- 1. "Polytunnel" Released: 29 October 2024; 2. "Boxing Day Sales" Released: 25 November 2024; 3. "Gondola" Released: 14 January 2025

Professional ratings
Aggregate scores
Source	Rating
Metacritic	86/100
Review scores
Source	Rating
AllMusic	4/5 stars
Beats Per Minute	85%
Clash	8/10
Mojo	4/5 stars
musicOMH	4.5/5 stars
The Observer	4/5 stars
Pitchfork	7.6/10
PopMatters	9/10
Record Collector	5/5 stars
Uncut	9/10

End of the Middle is the eighth solo studio album by the English progressive folk musician Richard Dawson, released on February 14, 2025 on Weird World, an imprint of Domino. Produced by Sam Grant and Dawson, the album features drummer and regular collaborator, Andrew Cheetham, appearing throughout, with additional clarinet provided by Faye MacCalman.

Released to critical acclaim, the album was preceded by the singles, "Polytunnel", "Boxing Day Sales" and "Gondola". Upon its release, the album reached number seventy-four on the UK Albums Chart, number sixteen on the Scottish Albums Chart, number three on the UK Independent Albums Chart and number seven on the UK Vinyl Albums Chart. The album is a concept album focusing on "several generations of one family, and how patterns of behaviour repeat across them."

== Writing and composition ==
Following the release of Dawson's loose trilogy of albums – Peasant (2017), 2020 (2019), and The Ruby Cord (2022) – each set within the past, present and future, respectively, Dawson started writing a concept album which focused on family dynamics across generations, noting: "It zooms in quite close up to try and explore a typical middle class English family home. We're listening to the stories of people from three or four generations of perhaps the same family. But really, it's about how we break certain cycles. I think the family is a useful metaphor to examine how things are passed on generationally." Dawson elaborated, "The whole thing's concerned with these unhealthy cycles of violence or distrust, and these things that get passed down, generation to generation. The characters do have a lot of sadness but I hope each one, in every song, is having a moment where they are somehow breaking that cycle or at least starting to shake the spiral. [...] Hopefully, it's encouraging."

Working from a shed in his allotment, Dawson wrote the lyrics to End of the Middle over a period of eight months in 2023. Shortly after finishing, Storm Jocelyn tipped his shed over, with Dawson noting: "Writing like this is not a very practical process. I don't know how else to do it, though. Horses will come and look in through the shed window, there are birds of prey and scampering animals of some description."

During the writing process, Dawson was inspired by the work of Japanese filmmaker Yasujirō Ozu, whose prominent themes included family, marriage, and the relationships between generations. Regarding his further influences, Dawson noted: "I wanted it to be like some Alain Robbe-Grillet or George Perec book – whole novels just describing spaces and rooms. Of course, an album turns out different to what you thought once you start to get into it. The weeds take over."

Several characters from Dawson's previous narrative-based songs make an appearance on the album, with Dawson noting, "All of the characters are quite fresh, they're all very present. I feel like I want to cry a little bit thinking about the guy in "Removals Van". Certain ones from older songs hang around: William and his mother from "William and His Mother Visit the Museum", the character in "The Almsgiver", and the woman in "Jogging"."

The album's opening track, "Bolt", which describes a family home getting struck by a bolt of lightning, was inspired by a real-life event that happened to Dawson in his youth: "Lightning actually struck my family home when I was a kid. My dad had got off the phone ten seconds before and then the phone was brown and charred. It was a really close shave – something like ten people a year die from getting struck by lightning through the phone". The album's fourth track, "The Question", focuses on a young girl called Elsie and her supernatural experiences with a headless ghost. The track was in part influenced by Dawson's mother's supernatural experiences as a young nurse, which he had previously explored on the 2022 track "Lily", alongside another of Dawson's relative's mental health issues: "They had hallucinated a headless figure. There was a railway at the bottom of the garden, and they later discovered somebody had jumped in front of a train and had their head chopped off." The album's final track, "More Than Real", was co-written with Dawson's partner and Hen Ogledd bandmate Sally Pilkington, who features on co-lead vocals and synthesiser. Pilkington "wrote the initial chords and melody" to the song, with its lyrics focusing on a father–daughter dynamic.

== Recording ==
Dawson recorded the album with his regular producer Sam Grant, guitarist of the Newcastle-based hard rock band Pigs Pigs Pigs Pigs Pigs Pigs Pigs. Grant had previously worked with Dawson on The Glass Trunk (2013), Peasant (2017), 2020 (2019) and The Ruby Cord (2022). Regarding the album's stripped-back aesthetic, Grant noted: "We wanted it to sound like Richard was in a living room playing to everyone and no-one. There's no fanfare, just a modesty and a very exposing sound that leaves the song itself no space for complacency."

Drummer Andrew Cheetham, who regularly joins Dawson during live performances and performed on The Ruby Cord, appears throughout the album. Regarding his role on the album, Cheetham noted: "Richard wanted it to be really simple. He kept asking me to make the drums sound 'weak' and 'frail', a little bit pathetic. We recorded it together, the vocals afterwards – he wanted that togetherness that you get on, say, Neil Young's Zuma, that laidback feel."

Clarinetist Faye MacCalman, a member of the Newcastle-based jazz band, Archipelago, appears throughout the album, with her contributions being credited as "bolts of lightning" in the album's liner notes. Dawson elaborated, describing her performances as "seen in a big, bright flash. Maybe they stay seen. I like the idea that the torch is going to be switched on, maybe when you're not expecting it. Also, it's to do with chaos and not knowing what's around the corner." He described the clarinet's role throughout the album as "like the lightning [in "Bolt"] reappearing at certain moments in each song to give us a zap – wake up!"

Regarding the aesthetic of the album's final track, "More Than Real", which is a collaboration with his partner Sally Pilkington, he noted: "We talked about Angelo Badalamenti and the documentaries you'd see on BBC or ITV, where the background music swells when there's an emotional moment, but it had to be a weird version of that. I was also thinking about Andrei Tarkovsky's Andrei Rublev (1966) – it's in black and white, and at the back end of it, after there's been twenty-five minutes of a young boy making a bell, it suddenly goes into colour. I wanted this to be that full-colour moment after a fairly desaturated experience. I was also thinking about Neil Young's "Philadelphia" – it's syrupy, kind of cheesy, but it has a lovely feel about it."

== Track listing ==
All tracks are written by Richard Dawson, except "More Than Real" (written by Dawson and Sally Pilkington).

End of the Middle track listing
No.	Title	Length
1.	"Bolt"	3:11
2.	"Gondola"	4:33
3.	"Bullies"	4:39
4.	"The Question"	7:55
5.	"Boxing Day Sales"	3:50
6.	"Knot"	7:33
7.	"Polytunnel"	4:17
8.	"Removals Van"	6:59
9.	"More Than Real"	6:12
Total length:		49:14

== Personnel ==
Credits adapted from the album's liner notes.

- Richard Dawson – guitar, vocals, miscellaneous instruments, production, layout
- Andrew Cheetham – drums
- Faye MacCalman – clarinet
- Sally Pilkington – vocals and synthesizer on "More Than Real"
- Sam Grant – recording, mixing
- Christian Wright – mastering
- Matthew Cooper – layout
- Paul J. Street – layout

== Charts ==
Chart performance for End of the Middle
Chart (2025)	Peak position
Scottish Albums (Official Charts)	17
UK Albums (Official Charts)	74
UK Album Downloads (Official Charts)	15
UK Folk Albums (Official Charts)	1
UK Independent Albums (Official Charts)	3
