= Free Humans =

Studio album by Hen Ogledd
- Released: September 25, 2020
- Genres: Experimental, alternative rock
- Length: 1:17:04
- Label: Domino

Hen Ogledd chronology
Mogic (2018)	Free Humans (2020)	Discombobulated (2026)

Free Humans is the third studio album by the British alternative rock band Hen Ogledd. It was released on September 25, 2020, by Domino Recording Company to generally favorable reviews.

== Reception ==
Professional ratings
Aggregate scores
Source	Rating
Metacritic	78/100
Review scores
Source	Rating
AllMusic	4/5 stars
Pitchfork	7.4/10
Beats Per Minute	75%
Uncut	4/5 stars

According to the review aggregator Metacritic, Free Humans received "generally favorable reviews" based on a weighted average score of 78 out of 100 from 6 critic scores. Writing for AllMusic, Fred Thomas described Free Humans as a "dense album, with sounds stuffed into every available space and fields of ideas painstakingly arranged on each song." Jazz Monroe of Pitchfork said that the album was "guided by a childlike innocence," also noting that the "silly-serious concept is as wonderful as the band’s delight in it".

== Track listing ==
All tracks are written by Hen Ogledd.

No.	Title	Length
1.	"Farewell"	5:23
2.	"Trouble"	5:50
3.	"Earworm"	4:38
4.	"Crimson Star"	5:16
5.	"Kebran Gospel Gossip"	6:14
6.	"Remains"	5:48
7.	"Paul is 9ft Tall (Marsh Gas)"	4:48
8.	"Space Golf"	4:57
9.	"Time Party"	5:48
10.	"The Loch Ness Monster's Song" (incorporates text by Edwin Morgan)	4:41
11.	"Flickering Lights"	4:53
12.	"Bwganod"	4:44
13.	"Feral"	8:54
14.	"Skinny Dippers"	7:20
Total length:		1:17:04

== Personnel ==
Credits are adapted from the album's Bandcamp.

=== Hen Ogledd ===
- Dawn Bothwell – vocals, microKORG, iMaschine 2, whistling, production
- Rhodri Davies – vocals, electric harp, percussion, triangle, claves, production, pedal harp on "Crimson Star"
- Richard Dawson – vocals, bass, gongs, tom-toms, hi-hat, production, additional guitar on "Trouble", "Remains", "Bwganod" and "Skinny Dippers"
- Sally Pilkington – vocals, Roland JD-Xi, Roland VT-3 vocoder, organ, percussion, production, design

=== Additional contributors ===
- Brychan, Elliw, Milenka and Zosia – vocals on "Bwganod"
- Oscar Fleming – percussion
- Lee Patterson – field recordings
- Mette Rasmussen – saxophone
- Pat Thomas – keyboards
- Sam Grant – production, recording
- Janne Hansson – recording (pedal harp on "Crimson Star")
- Christian Wright – mastering
- Anna Barratt – artwork
- Matthew Cooper – layout
- Paul J Street – layout
- Math Roberts – photography
