= Discombobulated =

Studio album by Hen Ogledd
- Released: 20 February 2026
- Studio: Blank
- Genres: Alternative rock; experimental
- Length: 49:36
- Label: Domino
- Producer: Sam Grant

Hen Ogledd chronology
Free Humans (2020)	Discombobulated (2026)

Discombobulated is the fourth studio album by the English alternative rock band Hen Ogledd. It was released on 20 February 2026 via Domino Recording Company to positive reception from critics.

== Reception ==
Professional ratings
Aggregate scores
Source	Rating
Metacritic	84/100
Review scores
Source	Rating
Clash	8/10
The Guardian	4/5 stars
No Ripcord	7.5/10
The Skinny	3/5 stars

According to the review aggregator Metacritic, Discombobulated received "universal acclaim" based on a weighted average score of 84 out of 100 from 10 critic scores. Writing for Clash, Tom Morgan described the album as "a smile-inducing, healing experience." In a more critical review, Nadia Younes of The Skinny said that "[Discombobulated] sways more into the meandering rather than the conclusive, [...] things feeling somewhat stunted."

== Track listing ==
All tracks are written by Hen Ogledd.

Side 1
No.	Title	Length
1.	"Nell's Prologue"	1:02
2.	"Scales Will Fall"	8:35
3.	"Dead in a Post-truth World"	6:12
4.	"Clara"	3:59
5.	"End of the Rhythm"	4:21
Total length:		24:09

Side 2
No.	Title	Length
6.	"Amser a Ddengys"	0:58
7.	"Clear Pools"	19:49
8.	"Land of the Dead"	4:40
Total length:		25:27

=== Note ===
- All track titles are stylized in sentence case.

== Personnel ==
Credits are adapted from the album's liner notes.

=== Hen Ogledd ===
- Dawn Bothwell – vocals, microKORG, Yamaha RX-11, Maschine 2, steel tongue drum, hand-led sleigh bells, production
- Rhodri Davies – vocals, Lyon & Healy Silhouette electric harp, bass, door harp, bray harp, production, piano on "Clara"
- Richard Dawson – bass, vocals, additional drum machine, Yamaha CS synthesizer, production, guitar on "Dead in a Post-truth World" and "Clear Pools", piano on "Land of the Dead", artwork, design
- Sally Pilkington – vocals, Roland JD-Xi, Roland Juno-DS, Northumbrian smallpipes, production, piano on "Clear Pools", artwork, design

=== Additional contributors ===
- Sam Grant – production, recording, mixing
- Christian Wright – mastering
- Will Guthrie – drums, percussion
- Fay MacCalman – saxophone, clarinet
- Nate Wooley – trumpet
- Nell Percival – spoken word on "Nell's Prologue"
- Nancy – spoken word on "Dead in a Post-truth World"
- Truly Kaput – spoken word on "Dead in a Post-truth World"
- Matana Roberts – spoken word on "Dead in a Post-truth World"
- C. Spencer Yeh – spoken word on "End of the Rhythm"
- Elliw – spoken word on "Land of the Dead"
- Brychan – spoken word on "Land of the Dead"
- Laura Phillips – projector recording on "Clara"
- Chris Watson – horse snort recording on "Clara"
- David Reid – insect and wind recording on "Land of the Dead"
- Matthew Cooper – layout
- Paul J Street – layout

== Charts ==
Chart performance for Discombobulated
Chart (2026)	Peak position
Scottish Albums (Official Charts)	24
UK Album Downloads (Official Charts)	12
UK Folk Albums (Official Charts)	7
UK Independent Albums (Official Charts)	8
