= Rhodri Davies =

Rhodri Davies may refer to:

- Rhodri Davies (musician) (born 1971), improvising harpist
- Rhodri Gomer-Davies (born 1983), rugby union football player
- Rhodri Talfan Davies (born 1971), director of BBC Cymru Wales
- Rhodri Davies (rugby union) (born 1991), Welsh rugby union player
- Rhodri Davies (football) (born 1994), goalkeeper for Wales football team
