= The Ruby Cord =

Studio album by Richard Dawson
- Released: 18 November 2022
- Genre: Progressive folk
- Length: 80:49
- Label: Domino Recording Company

Richard Dawson chronology
Henki (2021)	The Ruby Cord (2022)	End of the Middle (2025)

The Ruby Cord is the seventh studio album by the British avant-garde folk musician Richard Dawson, released on 18 November 2022 by Domino Recording Company.

The record was described as the final piece in a trilogy of albums, together with previous releases Peasant and 2020, set in "a sort of liminal reality that straddles real life and something more virtual" in the future.

== Reception ==
Professional ratings
Aggregate scores
Source	Rating
Metacritic	81/100
Review scores
Source	Rating
AllMusic	4/5 stars
Mojo	4/5 stars
MusicOMH	3.5/5 stars
Paste	(7.5/10)
Pitchfork	(6.8/10)
The Observer	3/5 stars
Uncut	4.5/5 stars

The Ruby Cord received acclaim from music critics. At Metacritic, which assigns a normalized rating out of 100 to reviews from mainstream critics, the album received an average score of 81 based on nine reviews, indicating "universal acclaim".

== Track listing ==
All tracks are written by Richard Dawson.

No.	Title	Length
1.	"The Hermit"	41:00
2.	"Thicker Than Water"	5:35
3.	"The Fool"	5:46
4.	"Museum"	8:06
5.	"The Tip of an Arrow"	10:06
6.	"No-one"	2:22
7.	"Horse and Rider"	7:54
Total length:		80:49

== Charts ==
Chart performance for The Ruby Cord
Chart (2022)	Peak position
Scottish Albums (Official Charts)	41
UK Album Downloads (Official Charts)	19
UK Folk Albums (Official Charts)	1
UK Independent Albums (Official Charts)	10
UK Vinyl Albums (Official Charts)	16
