= Death Hilarious =

Studio album by Pigs Pigs Pigs Pigs Pigs Pigs Pigs
- Released: 4 April 2025
- Genre: Sludge metal
- Length: 45:33
- Label: Rocket; Missing Piece
- Producer: Sam Grant

Pigs Pigs Pigs Pigs Pigs Pigs Pigs chronology
Land of Sleeper (2023)	Death Hilarious (2025)

Singles from Death Hilarious
- 1. "Detroit" Released: 11 November 2024; 2. "Stitches" Released: 22 January 2025

Death Hilarious is the fifth studio album by British stoner metal band Pigs Pigs Pigs Pigs Pigs Pigs Pigs. It was released on 4 April 2025, by Missing Piece Records in North America and Rocket Recordings in other regions.

== Background ==
Described as a "pure sludge metal record" and produced by guitarist Sam Grant, Death Hilarious consists of nine songs, including a collaboration with American rapper and producer El-P. The lead single of the album, "Detroit", was released on 11 November 2024. The second single, "Stitches", was released on 22 January 2025.

== Reception ==
Professional ratings
Aggregate scores
Source	Rating
Metacritic	80/100
Review scores
Source	Rating
DIY	3.5/5 stars
Kerrang!	4/5 stars
The Line of Best Fit	8/10 stars
MusicOMH	4/5 stars
New Noise	5/5 stars
Paste	7.5/10

The album received positive reviews from critics. On review aggregator Metacritic, the album received an average score of 80 out of 100 from 10 reviews, indicating "generally favorable" reviews.

New Noise Magazine's Kevin Jones rated the album five stars and commented "it is solid as all Hell; if you put it on, you're listening to the whole thing. Two, it pulls off things never thought possible in the genre." Matt Young of the Line of Best Fit assigned it a rating of eight out of ten, describing it as "a record that thrives on trust, experimentation, and the sheer joy of making a glorious, deafening racket together."

DIY Magazine referred to it as "a battle-ready hammer throw of a fifth album" and gave it 3.5 stars. Kerrang! remarked "Death Hilarious also finds them thoroughly exploring their sonic and emotional range, the result an album which digs its hooks in deeper than ever," rating the album four out of five.

Ross Horton of MusicOMH described Death Hilarious as "an album that laughs at you while pushing you down the stairs, that swaggers right up to the edge of oblivion and does a stupid little dance, that understands the absurdity of it all, but refuses to let that be an excuse for apathy."

Paste Magazine noted that "Death Hilarious is a lot of things, not least a thrashing good time, and it's an especially sober expression of the reluctant experience of waking into adulthood," giving it a rating of 7.5 out of ten, while the Quietus called the album "Another hulking beast of chugged rhythms and swirling guitars from the porcine Tynesiders."

== Track listing ==
All tracks are written by John-Michael Hedley, Ewan Mackenzie, Sam Grant, Matthew Baty, and Adam Ian Sykes; featured lyrics on "Glib Tongued" by Jaime Meline.

Death Hilarious track listing
No.	Title	Length
1.	"Blockage"	2:51
2.	"Detroit"	5:39
3.	"Collider"	3:27
4.	"Stitches"	5:27
5.	"Glib Tongued" (featuring El-P)	3:43
6.	"The Wyrm"	7:04
7.	"Carousel"	5:03
8.	"Coyote Call"	3:52
9.	"Toecurler"	8:27
Total length:		45:33

== Personnel ==
Credits adapted from the album's liner notes and Tidal.

=== Pigs Pigs Pigs Pigs Pigs Pigs Pigs ===
- John-Michael Hedley – electric bass guitar
- Ewan Mackenzie – drums
- Sam Grant – electric guitar, production, mixing
- Matthew Baty – lead vocals
- Adam Ian Sykes – electric guitar

=== Additional contributors ===
- Robin Schmidt – mastering
- Chris McManus – additional engineering
- John Martindale – additional engineering
- Richard Dawson – additional vocals, additional cowbell
- Sally Pilkington – additional vocals
- Chris Reeder – sleeve design
- Aaron Johnson – painting (Now We Hunt Hippopotamus)
- El-P – featured vocals on "Glib Tongued"
- Tim Schakel – additional engineering on "Glib Tongued"

== Charts ==
Chart performance for Death Hilarious
Chart (2025)	Peak position
Scottish Albums (OCC)	13
UK Album Downloads (OCC)	20
UK Independent Albums (OCC)	7
UK Rock & Metal Albums (OCC)	2
