= Ernstalbrecht Stiebler =

German composer (1934–2024)

Ernstalbrecht Stiebler (29 March 1934 – 7 June 2024) was a German composer of mostly chamber, choral, piano, and organ works in minimalist or reductionist style. His work has "three principal concerns: sonority, rhythm, and duration" leading "to a large and varied body of work".

== Biography ==
Stiebler was born in Berlin on 29 March 1934. He studied composition with Ernst Klussmann and piano at the Musikhochschule Hamburg, but had more important lessons at Darmstadt between 1958 and 1961, where he studied with Karlheinz Stockhausen in 1959 and where he first encountered the music of LaMonte Young. From Young he took on sustained sounds and gradually unfolding forms, developing a style based on minimalist structures and repetitions. His other primary influences are indicated by the music of other composers he promoted while a music producer at broadcaster Hessischer Rundfunk, where he stayed for 25 years: Morton Feldman, John Cage, Alvin Lucier, Giacinto Scelsi, Earle Brown and Christian Wolff.

Steibler's form of minimalism comes more from visual art than from mainstream minimalist music. He famously said: “Music is too important to burden it with emotions.” His music ranges from solo instrumental music to chamber ensembles (such as Trio 89 for cello, piano and percussion, and Three in One (1992) for bass flute and tape), choral pieces, and also full scale orchestral works such as Unisono Diviso ('Divided Unison', 1999) and Zwischen Den Tönen ('Slow Motion', 2003).

He died on 7 June 2024, at the age of 90.
