= Hen Ogledd (band) =

British alternative rock band

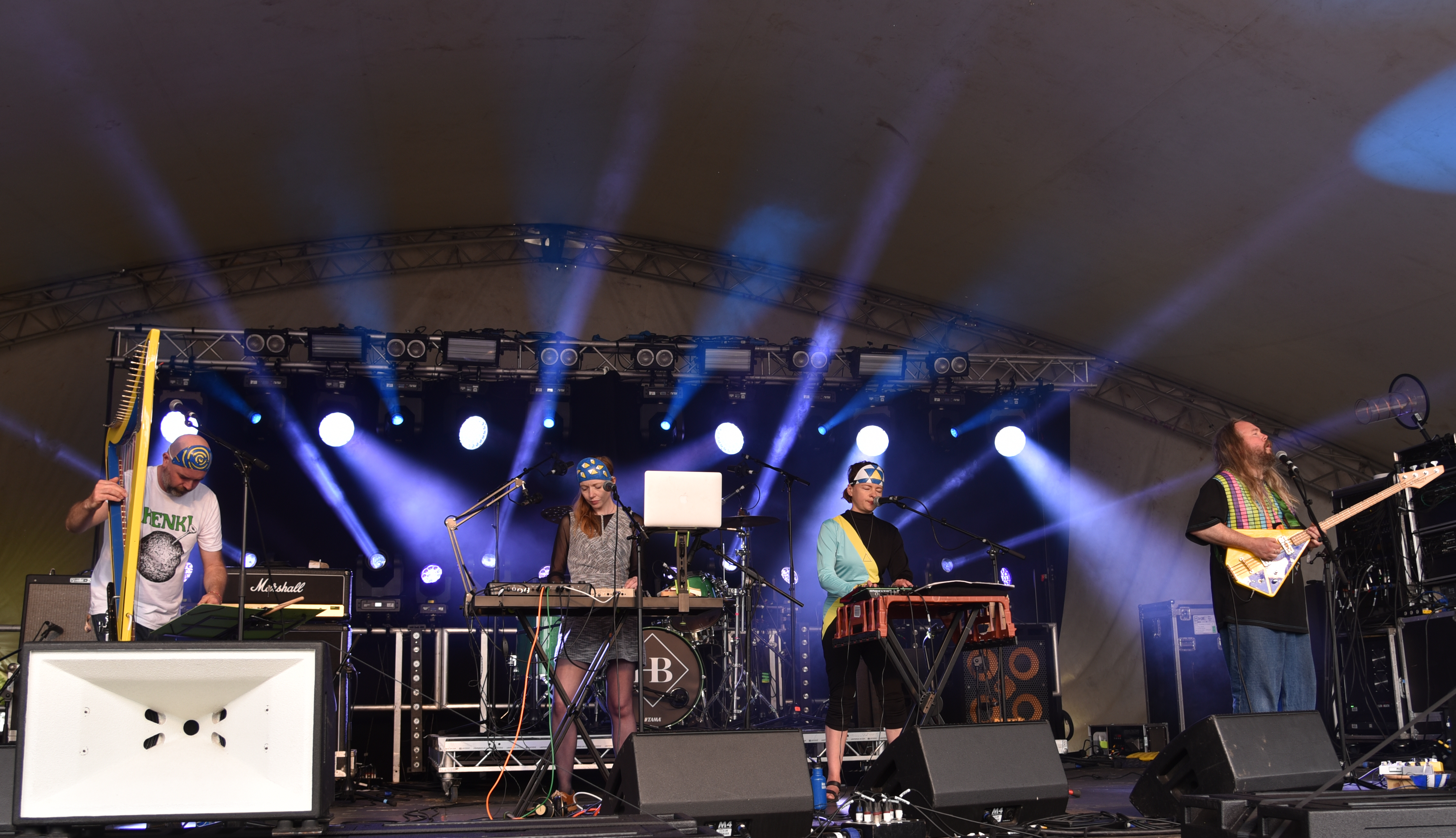
- Hen Ogledd performing in 2022

Background information
- Origin: Newcastle upon Tyne, Tyne and Wear, England
- Genres: Alternative rock; Experimental; Folk rock
- Label: Domino Recording Company
- Members: Dawn Bothwell; Sally Pilkington; Richard Dawson; Rhodri Davies
- Website: henogledd.com

Hen Ogledd is an alternative rock band from Newcastle upon Tyne, United Kingdom. Their songs are in English and Welsh.

== History ==
Hen Ogledd was initially formed as a duo of singer Richard Dawson and harpist Rhodri Davies in 2012. They released their debut studio album Dawson-Davies in 2013.

The group's third member, Dawn Bothwell, joined for the recording of their live album Bronze in 2016.

In 2018, the newest member, Sally Pilkington, joined the group for the recording of Mogic, the group's second album, which received significant attention from critics. Writing for SLUG, Evan Welsh called the album "psychedelic, electronic, noisy and obtuse, [but] also beautiful, natural and industrial."

In 2020, they switched labels, from Weird Worlds to its parent label, Domino Recording Company. They also released their fourth studio album Free Humans (following the sole lead single "Trouble") to "generally favorable reviews" from critics, according to Metacritic.

They released their latest album, Discombobulated, in 2026 to critical acclaim.

Their name comes from the Brythonic term for the Old North.

== Discography ==
=== Studio albums ===
- Dawson-Davies (2013)
- Mogic (2018)
- Free Humans (2020)
- Discombobulated (2026)

=== Live albums ===
- Bronze (2016)
