= Viscerals =

2020 studio album by Pigs Pigs Pigs Pigs Pigs Pigs Pigs

Studio album by Pigs Pigs Pigs Pigs Pigs Pigs Pigs
- Released: 3 April 2020
- Recorded: October – November 2019
- Studio: Blank Studios; Newcastle upon Tyne
- Genre: Stoner metal; psychedelic rock; noise rock; doom metal
- Length: 38:38
- Label: Rocket
- Producer: Sam Grant

Pigs Pigs Pigs Pigs Pigs Pigs Pigs chronology
King of Cowards (2018)	Viscerals (2020)	Land of Sleeper (2023)

Singles from Viscerals
- 1. "Reducer" Released: 13 January 2020; 2. "Rubbernecker" Released: 11 March 2020; 3. "Hell's Teeth" Released: 31 July 2020

Viscerals is the third studio album by British heavy metal band Pigs Pigs Pigs Pigs Pigs Pigs Pigs. The album was released on 3 April 2020 through Rocket Recordings. Three singles, "Reducer", "Rubbernecker", and "Hell's Teeth" were released with the album, the former two released ahead of the album's release.

== Background and recording ==
The album was recorded in October through November 2019 in Sam Grant's home studio, Blank Studios, in Newcastle upon Tyne.

== Music and composition ==
Dom Gourlay of Under the Radar described Viscerals as a "bludgeoning amalgamation of metal, punk, and experimental noise at its most brutal". Critics have described the album as heavy metal, alternative metal, psychedelic rock, sludge metal, stoner rock, doom metal, and noise rock.

== Release and promotion ==
=== Singles ===
Three singles were released in promotion of Viscerals. The lead off single, and first track on the album, "Reducer", was released on 13 January 2020. The second single, and second track on the album, "Rubbernecker", was released on 11 March 2020. The third and final single, as well as the final track on the album, "Hell's Teeth", was released on 31 July 2020.

Jon Hadusek, writing for Consequence said that "Reducer" is a doom metal and stoner rock song that "picks up where the band left off with 2018's King of Cowards." Hadusek further said that the song combined the grooves of Black Sabbath with "the crushing sonic treatments" of Sunn O))) and Electric Wizard. Hadusek summarized "Reducer" as "the next evolution of British doom and stoner metal, pushing the genre's riff-driven formulas to new experimental extremes."

=== Music videos ===
The music video for "Hell's Teeth" was released on 10 September 2020. The video was animated by Lucy Dyson.

== Critical reception ==
Professional ratings
Aggregate scores
Source	Rating
AnyDecentMusic?	7.7/10
Metacritic	80/100
Review scores
Source	Rating
AllMusic	3.5/5 stars
Classic Rock	4/5 stars
DIY	4/5 stars
Exclaim!	7/10
Kerrang!	3/5 stars
The Line of Best Fit	7.5/10
MusicOMH	5/5 stars
Q	4/5 stars
Uncut	4/5 stars
Under the Radar	8/10

Viscerals was well received by contemporary music critics. On review aggregator website, Metacritic, Viscerals has an average rating of 80 out of 100 indicating "generally favorable reviews based on 13 critics". On AnyDecentMusic?, Viscerals has an average rating of 7.7 out of 10.

Alan Ashton-Smith, writing for musicOMH gave the album a perfect five-star rating praising the accessibility of the album, calling Viscerals a work of "a metal band that has succeeded in garnering appreciation outside of heavy subculture and appealing to a wider community of music fans". Liam Konemann writing for Loud & Quiet gave the album four stars and said that Viscerals "is all guts and glory, tauter than before and all the better for it. It’s relentless; an all-out-assault of riffs and rumblings that pushes Pigs to new heights". Mark Deming in a positive review compared the work of the band to Black Sabbath saying "as if Black Sabbath's younger brothers got ahold of some bad dope and decided it was time to punish the world for its mistakes".

Max Morin, writing for Canadian publication, Exclaim! gave the album a positive review. Morin described the album as having the elements of doom metal similar to the likes of Black Sabbath, but said that their "grittiness to their heavy rock, a disregard for the rules of melody and harmony", makes the band sound more like the noise rock band Daughters than Sabbath. Specifically Morin said the sound of Viserals is "more like Daughters' terrifying You Won't Get What You Want more than Master of Reality."

In a more mixed review, Sam Law, writing for Kerrang also compared the album to Black Sabbath, but also to Motörhead, Mastodon, and Idles. Law described Viserals as "are wilfully difficult to get a handle on. Melding the fuzzed-up, stripped-back muscle of heavyweights like Black Sabbath and Motörhead to progressive sludginess, then pouring on a generous helping of the wryly abstract humour of IDLES, this third album is a strange, unruly offering".

== Track listing ==
All music is composed by Matthew Baty, Sam Grant, Adam Ian Sykes, John-Michael Joseph Hedley, and Chris Morley.

Viscerals track listing
No.	Title	Length
1.	"Reducer"	4:27
2.	"Rubbernecker"	4:27
3.	"New Body"	7:09
4.	"Blood and Butter"	1:39
5.	"World Crust"	3:08
6.	"Crazy in Blood"	5:13
7.	"Halloween Bolson"	9:00
8.	"Hell's Teeth"	3:33
Total length:		38:38

== Personnel ==
The following individuals were credited with the production of the album.

- Matthew Baty – vocals
- Richard Dawson – cowbell
- John Edgar – backing vocals
- Sam Grant – guitar, mixing, producer
- John-Michael Hedley – bass guitar
- Josh Ingledew – assistant engineer
- Max Löffler – artwork
- John Martindale – engineer
- Christopher Morley – drums
- Adam Sykes – guitar
- Christian Wright – mastering

== Charts ==
Chart performance for Viscerals
Chart (2020)	Peak position
Scottish Albums (OCC)	9
UK Albums (OCC)	67
UK Independent Albums (OCC)	3
UK Rock & Metal Albums (OCC)	2
