= Simon H. Fell =

English musical artist (1959–2020)

- Born: 13 January 1959; Dewsbury, Yorkshire, England
- Died: 28 June 2020 (aged 61)
- Genre: Free improvisation Experimental jazz
- Occupation: Musician
- Instrument: double bass
- Years active: 1970s–2020
- Website: Official website

Simon H. Fell (13 January 1959 – 28 June 2020) was an English jazz bassist and composer; he is primarily known for his work as a free improviser and the composer of ambitiously complex post-serialist works.

Fell began playing double bass in 1973. From 1978 to 1981 he read English Literature at Fitzwilliam College, Cambridge, an interest that led to ties to many of the poets associated with the Cambridge scene (a later work, Music for 10(0), involves settings of texts by the poet/music journalist/provocateur Ben Watson).

Fell's most notable early group was a group with drummer Paul Hession and saxophonist Alan Wilkinson, a free-jazz trio that was exceedingly fast and furious even by the standards of that genre. Their work was primarily released as cassettes and CDs on Fell's label Bruce's Fingers, including Bogey's and the group's only studio album, foom! foom! Their most sonically extreme statement, however, was the grainily recorded The Horrors of Darmstadt (Shock). (Its title is a sarcastic quotation from a BBC announcer, concerning the avant-garde Darmstadt School of composers.) During this period Fell was significantly connected with The Termite Club in Leeds. His previously mentioned Music for 10(0) was written to celebrate ten years of the existence of the club.

Other groups in which Fell was a member included the free jazz trio Badland (led by saxophonist Simon Rose; initially the drummer was Mark Sanders, with Steve Noble subsequently taking over the role), the improvising string and percussion ensemble ZFP (with Carlos Zingaro, Marcio Mattos and Mark Sanders), and SFQ, a quartet/quintet with changing membership, though clarinettist Alex Ward has been a constant. (Fell's 2001 version of his 70-minute SFQ composition Thirteen Rectangles was broadcast twice by the BBC, and subsequently nominated for the 'new work' award in the 2002 BBC Jazz Awards.) In sharp contrast to the uproar of Hession/Wilkinson/Fell, the trio IST (with Rhodri Davies and Mark Wastell) was one of the seminal groups in the development of the ultra-quiet aesthetic now generally called "EAI" or "electroacoustic improvisation". Fell also performed in many other ensembles, including the London Improvisers Orchestra and Derek Bailey's Company Week.

Fell's major sequence of compositions is titled Compilation (in total, four projects were issued under this heading). Despite the governing title, these are not collections of previous material but new, large-scale works. The musical language makes overt use of serialist procedures (such as tone rows, retrograde structures, &c), as well as many other techniques: extensive studio layering, overdubbing and reordering of material (so that seemingly "live" performances may be the result of carefully edited-together improvisations and/or notated material), and use of aleatoric techniques to "degrade" or distort precomposed structures into new shapes. Free improvisation, rock and jazz all form key parts of the musical language; one section of Compilation IV even includes a simultaneous homage to Karlheinz Stockhausen and Henry Mancini. The cast of musicians drawn on for these pieces usually included a mix of classically trained players, jazzers and free improvising musicians, as well as wild cards like the noise guitarist, Stefan Jaworzyn. While virtuoso players such as Evan Parker and John Butcher were essential to the projects, Fell often deliberately made use of amateur or student musicians, too, not as a makeshift but as an intentionally democratising and less predictable element.

Fell died on 28 June 2020.

Other large-scale composition projects included:

- his compositions for The London Improvisers' Orchestra (Papers, Happy Families, Köln Klang, Ellington 100 (Strayhorn 85), Morton's Mobile, Too Busy and Three Mondrians) (1998-2004)
- Kaleidozyklen, a 60-minute piece for improvising double bassist and orchestra (2000)
- Thirteen New Inventions, a major solo piano piece commissioned by Philip Thomas (2005)
- the concert-length BBC Radio 3 commission, Positions & Descriptions (for 18 musicians and prerecorded materials), premiered at the Huddersfield Contemporary Music Festival (2007)
- a one-hour suite for sextet, The Ragging Of Time, commissioned by the Marsden Jazz Festival (2014)

== Discography (selection) ==
composition projects

- SIMON H. FELL : Compilation I : (Bruce's Fingers LP 1985)
- PERSUASION A : Two Steps To Easier Breathing : (Bruce's Fingers LP 1988)
- SIMON H. FELL : Compilation II : (Bruce's Fingers LP 1990)
- SIMON H FELL : Music For 10(0) : (Leo CD 1995)
- SIMON H. FELL : Composition No. 30 : (Bruce's Fingers CD 1998)
- SIMON H. FELL : Composition No. 12.5 : (Bruce's Fingers CD 1999)
- SFQ : Thirteen Rectangles : (Bruce's Fingers CD 2002)
- SIMON H. FELL : Kaleidozyklen : (Bruce's Fingers CD 2002)
- SFQ : Four Compositions : (Red Toucan CD 2004)
- SIMON H. FELL : Composition No. 62 : (Bruce's Fingers CD 2005)
- THE MANCINI PROJECT : Views Of Mancini : (FMR CD 2008)
- SFE : Positions & Descriptions : (Clean Feed CD 2011)
- SFD : Gruppen Modulor 1 : (Bruce's Fingers digital 2014)

Hession / Wilkinson / Fell

- HESSION/WILKINSON/FELL : foom! foom! : (Bruce's Fingers CD 1992)
- HESSION/WILKINSON/FELL : The Horrors Of Darmstadt : (Shock CD 1994)
- HESSION/WILKINSON/FELL + MORRIS : Registered Firm : (Incus CD 1998)
- HESSION/WILKINSON/FELL : Bogey's : (Bruce's Fingers CD 2000)
- HESSION/WILKINSON/FELL : St. John's : (Ecstatic Peace! CD 2000)
- HESSION/WILKINSON/FELL : Two Falls & A Submission : (Bo'Weavil CD 2011)

IST

- IST : Consequences (Of Time And Place) : (Confront CD 1997)
- IST : Anagrams To Avoid : (SIWA LP 1997)
- IST : Ghost Notes : (Bruce's Fingers CD 1998)
- IST : Lodi : (Confront CD 2006)
- IST : Berlin : (Confront CD 2013)

other groupings

- SOMETHING ELSE : Start Moving Earbuds : (Bruce's Fingers CD 1994)
- BADLAND : Badland : (Bruce's Fingers CD 1995)
- DESCENSION : Live, March 1995 : (Shock CD 1995)
- SOMETHING ELSE : Playing With Tunes : (Bruce's Fingers CD 1997)
- DESCENSION : "My Middle Name Is Funk" : (Amanita 7in 1997)
- VHF : Extracts : (Erstwhile CD 1999)
- COXHILL/HASLAM/HESSION/RUTHERFORD/FELL : Termite One : (Bruce's Fingers CD 2000)
- LONDON IMPROVISERS ORCHESTRA : Proceedings : (Emanem CD 2000)
- BAILEY/DAVIES/FELL/GAINES/WASTELL : Company In Marseille : (Incus CD 2001)
- LONDON IMPROVISERS ORCHESTRA : The Hearing Continues : (Emanem CD 2001)
- BADLAND : Axis Of Cavity : (Bruce's Fingers CD 2002)
- DEREK BAILEY + SIMON H. FELL : 15 August 2001 : (Sound 323 CD 2002)
- LONDON IMPROVISERS ORCHESTRA : Freedom Of The City 2002 : (Emanem CD 2003)
- LONDON IMPROVISERS ORCHESTRA : Responses, Reproduction & Reality : (Emanem CD 2005)
- ZFP QUARTET : Music For Strings, Percussion & Electronics : (Bruce's Fingers CD 2005)
- BADLAND : The Society Of The Spectacle : (Emanem CD 2005)
- PHILIP THOMAS : Comprovisation : (Bruce's Fingers CD 2007)
- ZFP QUARTET : Ulrichsberg München Musik : (Bruce's Fingers CD 2007)
- BRÖTZMANN/WILKINSON QUARTET : One Night In Burmantofts : (Bo'Weavil CD 2007)
- LONDON IMPROVISERS ORCHESTRA : Improvisations For George Riste : (Psi CD 2008)
- JOE MORRIS / SIMON H. FELL / ALEX WARD : The Necessary And The Possible : (Victo CD 2009)
- CHRIS BURN / PHILIP THOMAS / SIMON H. FELL : The Middle Distance : (Another Timbre CD 2010)
- SIMON H. FELL : Frank & Max : (Bo'Weavil CD 2011)
- DEREK BAILEY & SIMON H. FELL : The Complete 15th August 2001 : (Confront CD 2013)
- BADLAND : Six High Windows : (Bug Incision CD 2013)
