= Mark Wastell =

English musician (born 1968)

- Born: Colchester, England
- Genres: Free improvisation
- Occupation: Musician
- Instruments: Cello, piano, percussion, electronics, tam tam
- Years active: 1994–present
- Label: Confront Recordings
- Formerly of: IST, The Sealed Knot, Assumed Possibilities, The Seen

Mark Wastell (born Orsett, 1968) is an English free improvisation musician who plays cello, double bass, electronics, tam tam and percussion. He performs solo and in various group and collaborative situations, notably IST (with Simon H. Fell and Rhodri Davies) and The Sealed Knot (with Burkhard Beins and Rhodri Davies).

During the 1990s Wastell was an originator of the New London Silence, a form of free improvisation that focused on soft sounds, delicate attack and low volume. Since 1996 he has run the Confront Recordings label. Confront Recordings has been described as "one of the most original and intelligent labels of contemporary avant and improvised music". Between 2001 and 2010 he ran Sound 323, a record shop and mail order service that also hosted performances from artists including Keith Rowe, Derek Bailey, David Toop and Taku Sugimoto. During its time in operation, Sound 323 was described by Clive Bell in The Wire as "an epicentre of much of London's improvised music".

== IST ==
Formed with Simon H. Fell and Rhodri Davies, IST was in operation between 1997-2002. The trio used acoustic string instruments (cello, double bass, harp), deploying extended techniques and preparations to combine free improvisation with semi-composed pieces. The trio gigged extensively, in the UK and internationally. They supported Derek Bailey and John Zorn at the Barbican London and performed in Italy, Berlin and New York. According to Richard Cochrane, "While many free improv groups saw away at their instruments striving to be "difficult", IST seem to be genuinely trying to make their extremely intricate music communicate as clearly as possible".

== The Sealed Knot ==
The Sealed Knot is an ongoing collaborative project between Wastell, Rhodri Davies and Burkhard Beins, starting in 2000. Wastell and Davies have been keen to differentiate the group's aesthetic from that of IST, with the use of electronics (as opposed to IST's purely acoustic sounds) and repetition, and the emphasis on pure improvisation feeding into the group's operations. Michael Rosenstein's review of and we disappear described the release as "a consummate example of the refined, spontaneously composed forms the three have mastered, working with ... bowed and scraped cymbals and drum heads, bowed and beaten bass, and harp harmonics and overtones." The trio's Surface/Plane was listed as one of The Wire's Top 10 Improvised Music Records for 2003.

== The Seen ==
The Seen is a large-group ensemble, convened by Wastell for specific performances. Line-ups are evolving and never repeated, with participants selected by Wastell from across the fields of free improvisation and experimental musics. Performances are generally improvised, although Wastell provides some instruction to musicians or sub-groups of musicians within the larger ensemble prior to performance. The Seen's live performances were, at first, sporadic and its recordings non-existent. This changed with the release of The Seen Archive: Volumes I-V, spanning concerts the group played between 2005 and 2009. A second archival release documented increasing activity, and the ensemble continues to be a going concern. More than 175 participants have performed with The Seen including Stewart Lee, Bertrand Denzler, Bill Thompson, Jacques Demierre, Jennifer Allum, Michael Francis Duch, Angharad Davies, Yoni Silver, Jason Kahn and Annette Krebs.

== Confront Recordings ==
Wastell formed Confront Recordings in 1996, initially as a platform for releasing his own music, inspired by labels such as Derek Bailey's Incus Records and Simon H. Fell's Bruce's Fingers. Having developed musical relationships across the improvisation scene the label expanded to release work from other artists from the UK and across the world. Its catalogue includes Tony Oxley, Sidsel Endresen, Joëlle Léandre, Mike Cooper, Paul Dunmall, Jeph Jerman, Matilda Rolfsson, Keith Tippett, Duch Baker, Roger Turner, Valentina Margaletti and many others.

== Selected discography ==
=== IST ===
- Anagrams To Avoid (Siwa, 1997)
- Consequences (Of Time And Place) (Confront Recordings, 1997)
- Ghost Notes (Bruce's Fingers, 1998)
- A More Attractive Way (Confront Recordings, 2021)

=== The Sealed Knot ===
- The Sealed Knot (Confront Recordings, 2000)
- Surface/Plane (Meniscus, 2003)
- and we disappear (another timbre, 2009)
- Twenty (Confront Recordings, 2020)

=== The Seen ===
- Archives : Volumes I - V : 2005 To 2009 (Confront Recordings, 2017)
- Archives : Volumes VI - X : 2014 To 2016 (Confront Recordings, 2019)
- For Sake Of Joy Of Study Of Oneself Together (Confront Recordings, 2020)

=== Solo ===
- Vibra #1 (W.M.O./r, 2004)
- Amongst English Men (absinthRecords, 2006)
- After Hours (Cathnor, 2009)
- Vibra: Trent (Linear Obsessional Recordings, 2015)
- Cello-Intern Solos (Confront Recordings, 2022)
- Pre-existing Commitments (Hundred Years Gallery, 2023)

=== As leader, co-leader ===
- Assumed possibilities with Chris Burn, Rhodri Davies and Phil Durrant (Confront Recordings, 1998)
- Davies/Rombola/Davis/Wastell with Rhodri Davies, Alessandra Rombola, Matt Davis, (Confront Recordings, 2000)
- Foldings with Tetuzi Akiyama, Toshimaru Nakamura, Taku Sugimoto (Confront Recordings 2002)
- Done as Broken Consort, with Matt Davis, Rhodri Davies (Quakebasket, 2002)
- open with Matt Davis, Phil Durrant (Erstwhile, 2003)
- +minus [First Meeting] as +minus, with Bernhard Günter, Graham Halliwell (Trente Oiseaux, 2004)
- Kiss of acid with Lasse Marhaug (Monotype Records, 2004)
- Live at I-and-E Festival with Keith Rowe (Confront Recordings, 2006)
- Caressed on the brow by unseen hands with Tetuzi Akiyama, Benedict Drew, Mattin, Michael Duch, Annette Krebs, Nishide Takehiro, Rhodri Davies, Andrea Neumann, Graham Halliwell, Paul Hood (L'Innomable, 2006)
- A life saved by a spider and two doves with Max Eastley, Graham Halliwell, Evan Parker (another timbre, 2007)
- John Cage: Four4 with Simon Allen, Chris Burn, Lee Patterson (another timbre, 2010)
- Membrane with Burkhard Beins, John Butcher (Confront Recordings, 2014)
- There Is No Love with Rhodri Davies, David Sylvian (Confront Recordings, 2017)
- And John with Maggie Nichols (Confront Recordings, 2023)
