= Nothing Important =

Studio album by Richard Dawson
- Released: 2014
- Genre: Progressive folk
- Length: 44:09
- Label: Weird World

Richard Dawson chronology
The Glass Trunk (2013)	Nothing Important (2014)	Peasant (2017)

Nothing Important is a studio album by Richard Dawson, released in 2014 by Weird World. The album consists of four songs, two of which ("Nothing Important" and "The Vile Stuff") exceed 16 minutes in length. The cover of the album features a photograph by Kuba Ryniewicz.

== Reception ==
Professional ratings
Aggregate scores
Source	Rating
Metacritic	78/100
Review scores
Source	Rating
AllMusic	3.5/5 stars
The Guardian	5/5 stars
The Line of Best Fit	7/10 stars
Loud and Quiet	9/10
musicOMH	3.5/5 stars
NME	7/10
Pitchfork	7.8/10
The Quietus	(favourable)

Nothing Important has received some acclaim from music critics. At Metacritic, which assigns a normalized rating out of 100 to reviews from mainstream critics, the album received an average score of 78 based on ten reviews, indicating "generally favourable reviews". The Wire listed it on second position of its "Releases of the Year" 2014.

In his review of the album for AllMusic, critic Marc Deming said that "the fact that one man with a guitar and some occasional overdubs can make something this powerful and challenging is truly impressive...Nothing Important's best moments clearly belie its title." Guardian reviewer Michael Hann wrote that "this is a record that unsettles and subverts. Whether it's a masterpiece or a fraud will become apparent with the passage of time."

== Track listing ==
All tracks are written by Richard Dawson.

No.	Title	Length
1.	"Judas Iscariot"	6:40
2.	"Nothing Important"	16:15
3.	"The Vile Stuff"	16:26
4.	"Doubting Thomas"	4:48
