= Land of Sleeper =

Studio album by Pigs Pigs Pigs Pigs Pigs Pigs Pigs
- Released: 17 February 2023
- Genre: Stoner metal
- Length: 40:43
- Labels: Rocket; Missing Piece
- Producer: Sam Grant

Pigs Pigs Pigs Pigs Pigs Pigs Pigs chronology
Viscerals (2020)	Land of Sleeper (2023)	Death Hilarious (2025)

Singles from Land of Sleeper
- 1. "Mr. Medicine" Released: November 1, 2022; 2. "Ultimate Hammer" Released: January 24, 2023

Land of Sleeper is the fourth studio album by British heavy metal band Pigs Pigs Pigs Pigs Pigs Pigs Pigs, released on 17 February 2023 through Rocket Recordings and Missing Piece Records. The album marks the return of the band's original drummer Ewan Mackenzie, after he was replaced between 2017 and 2021 with Chris Morley. It received positive reviews from critics and charted on the UK Albums Chart.

== Critical reception ==
Professional ratings
Aggregate scores
Source	Rating
Metacritic	77/100
Review scores
Source	Rating
AllMusic	3.5/5 stars
Clash	8/10
DIY	3.5/5 stars
Exclaim!	7/10
The Guardian	4/5 stars
MusicOMH	4.5/5 stars
Pitchfork	7.5/10
Uncut	7/10
Under the Radar	7.5/10 stars

Land of Sleeper received a score of 77 out of 100 on review aggregator Metacritic based on 10 critics' reviews, indicating "generally favorable" reception. James Christopher Monger of AllMusic felt that the band "confront existential dread with creativity on the elemental Land of Sleeper" and "despite the discordant vibe and greasy garage patina, the group's fourth long-player harbors some weirdly unifying songs". Eric Hill of Exclaim! stated that the album "transcends when taken in as a whole, with tracks that are perhaps individually a bit workmanlike but soar when plugged next to the surrounding pieces". Uncut remarked that "while Pigs x7 couldn't get much heavier, they sound noticeably angrier on this follow-up to 2020's Viscerals, adding lyrical themes of self-loathing and misanthropy into the mix".

Pitchfork's Will Ainsley opined that the band "do many things but they also embody the theatre, camp, and sheer fun of all the best heavy music" on the album, which he pointed out is "still loud and punishing". Clash's Sam Walker-Smart described it as "the group's most accessible yet darkest release to date" and "a slab of awe-inspiring heaviness that's somehow timeless while reflecting the confusing and anger-inducing times we live in". Michael James Hall of Under the Radar observed the "relentless intensity, unforgiving heft, and mesmeric miasma" and "plenty of taut aggression, Sabbath savagery, and cathartic brutality" on display.

David Murphy of MusicOMH summarised that "when it comes to producing intense weighty noise, there's nothing wry or ironic about them, and fourth album Land of Sleeper might be their chunkiest offering yet". Emma Wilkes of DIY found the band to be "far more penetrable, learning over time to be more immediate than, say, their debut consisting of three tracks, each stretching past the 15-minute mark. Nonetheless, their music remains as unkempt and feral as ever". Reviewing the album for The Guardian, Matt Mills called it "neither a departure nor a disappointment. Instead, over 40 minutes, it refines the sound of Pigs x7 and highlights the band's strengths". Daniel Hignell of The Quietus called it "unlikely to win over anyone who doesn't already enjoy Pigs' (etc.) particular brand of stoner rock, but then, I doubt it's really trying to. A steadfastly unsubtle affair, it is perhaps ironic that on an album that doubles down on its celebration of psych and metal tropes [...] it is at their most experimental that Pigs Pigs Pigs Pigs Pigs Pigs Pigs are at their mightiest".

== Track listing ==
All tracks are written by Pigs Pigs Pigs Pigs Pigs Pigs Pigs.

Land of Sleeper track listing
No.	Title	Length
1.	"Ultimate Hammer"	4:50
2.	"Terror's Pillow"	4:37
3.	"Big Rig"	6:31
4.	"The Weatherman"	6:46
5.	"Mr Medicine"	2:26
6.	"Pipe Down!"	4:11
7.	"Atlas Stone"	5:31
8.	"Ball Lightning"	5:51
Total length:		40:43

== Charts ==
Chart performance for Land of Sleeper
Chart (2023)	Peak position
Scottish Albums (Official Charts)	12
UK Albums (Official Charts)	82
UK Independent Albums (Official Charts)	3
UK Rock & Metal Albums (Official Charts)	2
