= King of Cowards =

2018 studio album by Pigs Pigs Pigs Pigs Pigs Pigs Pigs

Studio album by Pigs Pigs Pigs Pigs Pigs Pigs Pigs
- Released: 28 September 2018
- Recorded: February – March 2018
- Studio: Blank Studios; Newcastle upon Tyne
- Genre: Doom metal; psychedelic rock; stoner metal
- Length: 40:26
- Label: Rocket
- Producer: Sam Grant

Pigs Pigs Pigs Pigs Pigs Pigs Pigs chronology
Feed the Rats (2017)	King of Cowards (2018)	Viscerals (2020)

Singles from King of Cowards
- 1. "Cake of Light" Released: 10 July 2018; 2. "GNT" Released: 3 September 2018

King of Cowards is the second studio album by British stoner metal band Pigs Pigs Pigs Pigs Pigs Pigs Pigs. The album was released on 28 September 2018 through Rocket Recordings.

== Track listing ==
All music is composed by Matthew Baty, Sam Grant, Adam Ian Sykes, John-Michael Joseph Hedley, and Chris Morley.

King of Cowards track listing
No.	Title	Length
1.	"GNT"	5:49
2.	"Shockmaster"	6:10
3.	"A66"	8:52
4.	"Thumbsucker"	7:46
5.	"Cake of Light"	3:45
6.	"Gloamer"	8:02
Total length:		40:26

== Critical reception ==
Professional ratings
Aggregate scores
Source	Rating
Album of the Year	77/100
Metacritic	80/100
Review scores
Source	Rating
Classic Rock	3.5/5 stars
Drowned in Sound	8/10
The Guardian	4/5 stars
The Line of Best Fit	8/10
Mojo	4/5 stars
musicOMH	4.5/5 stars
Q	3/5 stars
Quietus	4/5 stars
The Skinny	4/5 stars
Uncut	4/5 stars

King of Cowards was well received by contemporary music critics. On review aggregator website, Metacritic, King of Cowards has an average rating of 80 out of 100 indicating "generally favorable reviews based on 10 critics". On Album of the Year, King of Cowards has an average rating of 77 out of 100 based on ten critic reviews.
