= Judicaël Cancoriet =

France international rugby union player

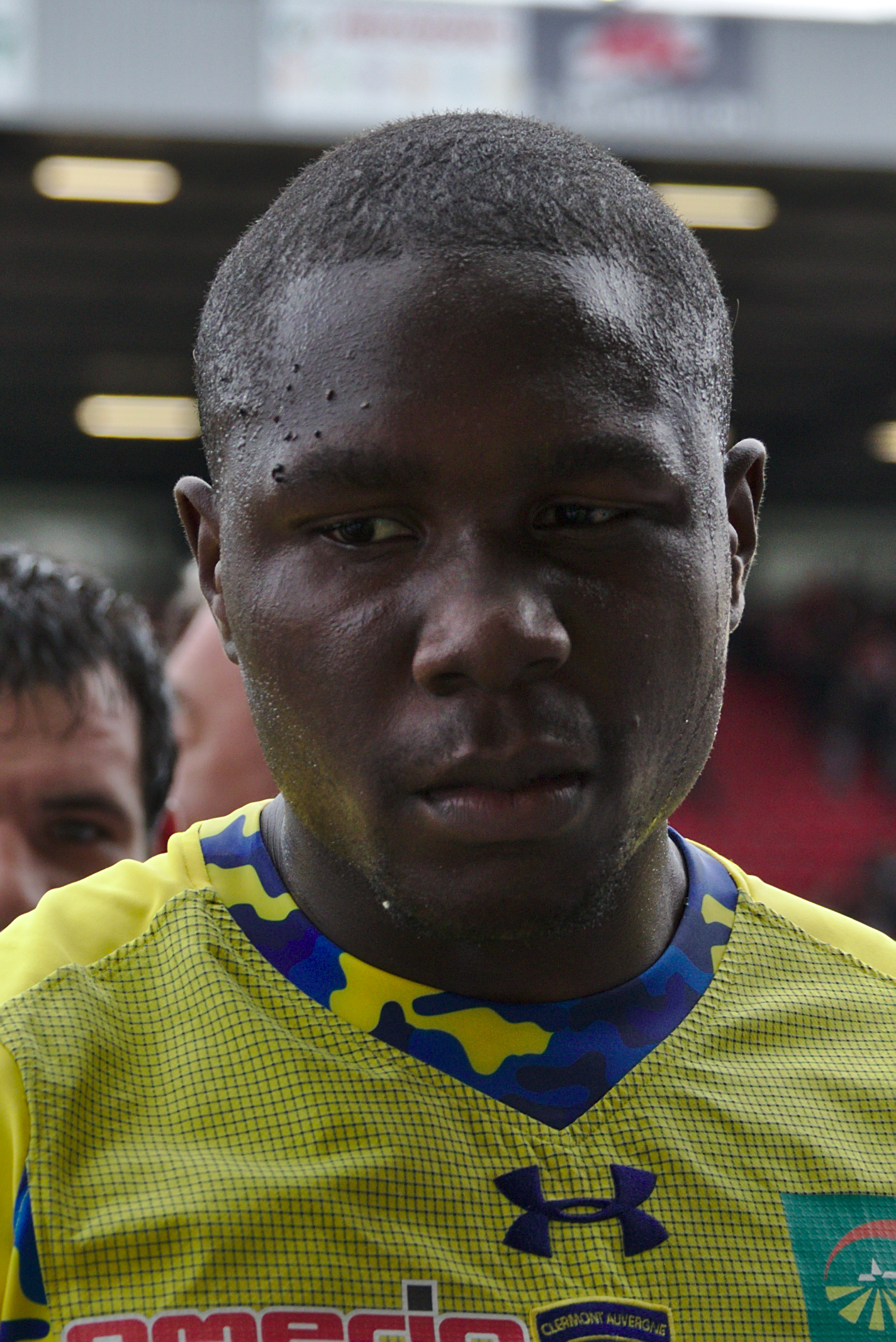
- Cancoriet with Clermont in 2015
- Born: 25 April 1996 (age 30) Sarcelles, France
- Height: 1.94 m (6 ft 4 1/2 in)
- Weight: 112 kg (17 st 9 lb)

Rugby union career
- Position: Flanker
Senior career
| Years | Team | Apps | (Points) |
| 2014–2015 | Massy | 9 | (5) |
| 2015–2023 | Clermont Auvergne | 136 | (55) |
| 2023– | La Rochelle | 1 | (0) |
- Correct as of 23 August 2023
International career
| Years | Team | Apps | (Points) |
| 2017– | France | 5 | (0) |
- Correct as of 13 July 2024

Judicaël Cancoriet (born 25 April 1996) is a French rugby union player. His position is Flanker and he currently plays for La Rochelle in the Top 14. He began his career at RC Massy.
