= Henki =

Studio album by Richard Dawson and Circle
- Released: 26 November 2021
- Length: 55:52
- Label: Weird World

Richard Dawson chronology
2020 (2019)	Henki (2021)	The Ruby Cord (2022)

Circle chronology
Terminal (2017)	Henki (2021)

Henki is a 2021 collaborative album by the English singer-songwriter Richard Dawson and the Finnish experimental rock group Circle. The album has seven songs that are all related to the life of plants and trees. The title, according to Circle's Jussi Lehtisalo, is a Finnish word meaning "spirit" or "ghost". The collaboration between Dawson and Circle started with the exchange of demos, and then they met in Pori, a city on Finland's West Coast where Circle are based. The COVID-19 pandemic and the 2020 lockdown meant the album had to be finished remotely.

== Meaning ==
All of the song titles are names of different plant species or individuals, and the content of each song references the titular plant either obliquely or directly, telling stories of people connected to them. For example, "Methuselah" tells the story of Donald Rusk Currey's cutting down of Prometheus, the world's oldest tree. "Cooksonia" tells the story of Isabel Cookson, the paleobotanist and namesake of the primitive vascular plant Cooksonia. "Silphium" refers to the extinction of the lost Roman herb silphium, from the perspective of a struggling merchant at the time. "Lily" tells of a hospital nurse in Newcastle who witnesses paranormal events after the death of patients, including the appearance of a room full of flowers.

== Reception ==
Professional ratings
Aggregate scores
Source	Rating
AnyDecentMusic?	8.0/10
Metacritic	87/100
Review scores
Source	Rating
AllMusic	4/5 stars
Evening Standard	3/5 stars
The Guardian	4/5 stars
Irish Times	4/5 stars
Pitchfork	7.5/10
Uncut	4.5/5 stars

According to the review aggregator Metacritic, Henki received "universal acclaim" based on a weighted average score of 87 out of 100 from 9 critic scores.

Critics thought well of the album. Louis Pattison, writing for Pitchfork, gave the album 7.5 out of 10, and said, "In a catalog already noted for strangeness, Henki might be Richard Dawson's strangest album to date. But his ideas are fertilized by these songs' peculiar twists and turns; the more Dawson and Circle lean into their eccentricities, the more their music resonates. Whatever Dawson writes about, he's really writing about people—the ways we choose to live our lives, and the strange and awful things that befall us along the way. Henki blows up these themes into widescreen, unfolding across continents, centuries, and even the afterlife." Phil Mongredien, writing for The Guardian, highlighted "Silene" and "Methuselah": "A sprawling epic written from the perspective of a seed and a lament for an ancient tree are highlights on this inspired collaboration".

=== Year-end lists ===
Henki on year-end lists
Publication	#	Ref.
The Needle Drop	7	
The Quietus	7	
Uncut	10	
The Wire	35	

== Track listing ==
1. "Cooksonia" – 6:30
2. "Ivy" – 8:57
3. "Silphium" – 12:07
4. "Silene" – 7:16
5. "Methuselah" – 8:26
6. "Lily" – 5:56
7. "Pitcher" – 6:36

== Charts ==
Chart performance for Henki
Chart (2021–2022)	Peak position
Scottish Albums (Official Charts)	62
UK Album Downloads (Official Charts)	37
UK Folk Albums (Official Charts)	1
UK Independent Albums (Official Charts)	8
