= Rhodri Davies (rugby union) =

- Born: Rhodri Davies; 14 October 1991 (age 35) Crymych, Wales
- Height: 178 cm (5 ft 10 in)
- Weight: 80 kg (12 st 8 lb)
- School: Ysgol y Preseli
- University: Cardiff Metropolitan University

Rugby union career
- Position: Scrum-Half
- Current team: Dragons
Senior career
Years	Team	Apps	(Points)
2014–2017	Scarlets	6	(0)
2017	→ Cardiff Blues (loan)	2	(5)
2017–2018	Rotherham Titans	21	(45)
2018–	Dragons	0	(0)
- Correct as of 9 July 2018
National sevens team
Years	Team		Comps
2012–2015	Wales 7s		

Rhodri Davies (born 14 October 1991) is a Welsh rugby union player who plays for the Dragons as a scrum-half. He was a Wales sevens international.

Davies joined the Dragons in 2018 having previously played for the Scarlets academy, Scarlets and Rotherham Titans while also enjoying a spell on loan at Cardiff Blues.
