= Christopher Tolofua =

French rugby union player (born 1993)

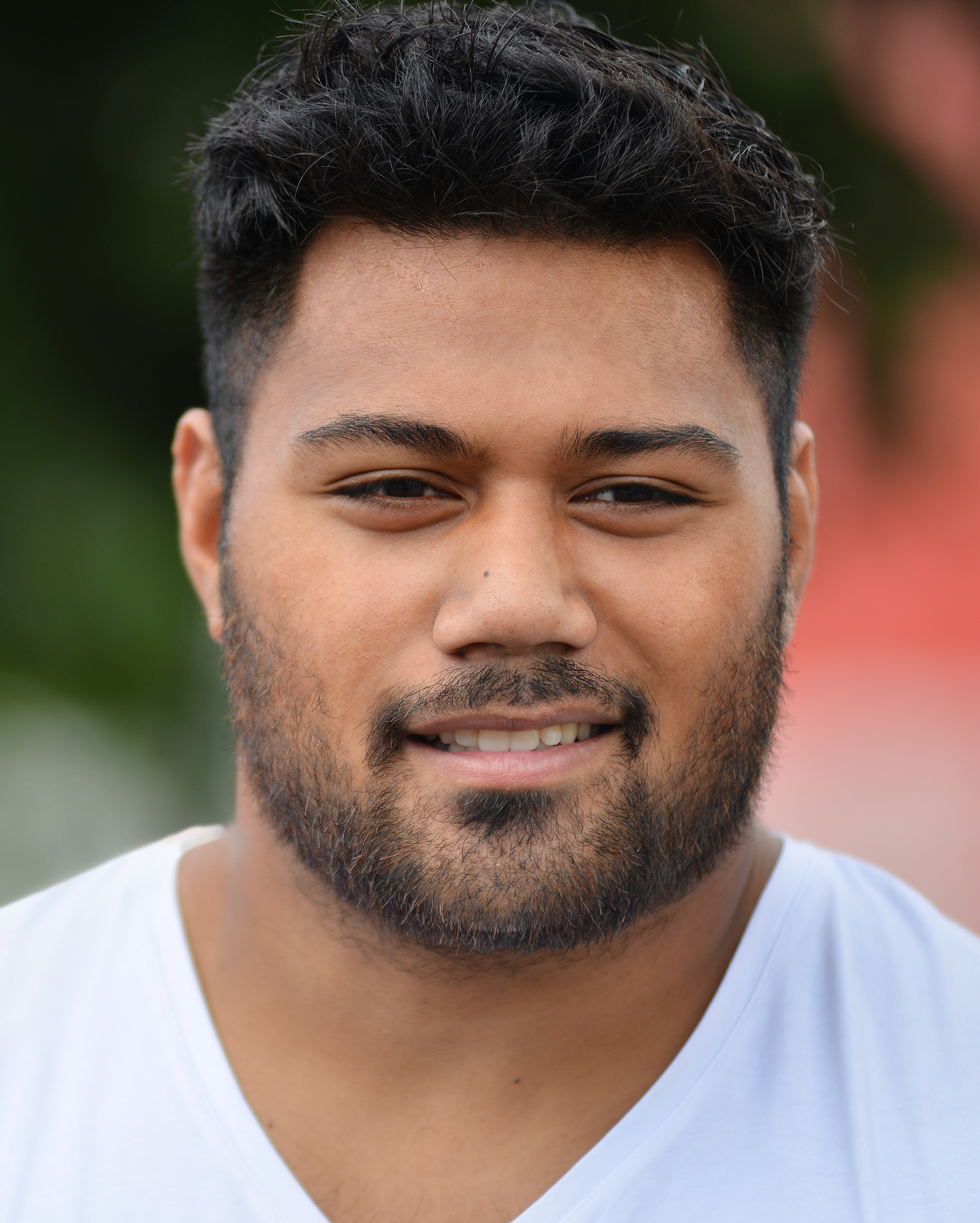
- Born: Christopher Tolofua; 31 December 1993 (age 32) Fréjus, France
- Height: 1.82 m (5 ft 11 1/2 in)
- Weight: 125 kg (276 lb; 19 st 10 lb)

Rugby union career
- Position: Hooker
- Current team: Montpellier
Amateur team(s)
| Years | Team | Apps | (Points) |
- URC Dumbéa
| 1996–2007 | Marcq-en-Barœul | | |
| 2007–2012 | Toulouse | | |
Senior career
| Years | Team | Apps | (Points) |
| 2012–2017 | Toulouse | 108 | (25) |
| 2017–2019 | Saracens | 34 | (5) |
| 2019– | Toulon | 68 | (20) |
- Correct as of 5 February 2023
International career
| Years | Team | Apps | (Points) |
| 2012–2013 | France U20 | 9 | (0) |
| 2012– | France | 7 | (0) |
- Correct as of 1 September 2018

Christopher Tolofua (born 31 December 1993) is a French rugby union player who currently plays for Montpellier. His regular playing position is Hooker.

== Club career ==
Tolofua made his debut for Toulouse against Connacht in Hcup. He was called as a cover for Gary Botha and Akvsenti Giorgadze who were ruled out due to injury. He was called up from Toulouse's junior side. He was part of the French national academy.

On 31 August 2016, Tolofua agreed to join English club Saracens in the Aviva Premiership on a two-year contract from the 2017-18 season. On 30 October 2018, Tolofua returns to France to join Top 14 side Toulon on a three-year deal from the 2019-20 season. In 2024, Toloufa moved to Montpellier. There was a dispute between the two clubs around the circumstances of his departure. Toulon had originally claimed there were no plans for a deal but it occurred because Tolofua asked for his release to go to Montpellier. Tolufua however claimed it was because he had been offered no extension.

In 2026, Tolofua started transitioning to play as a tighthead prop by focussing on weight gain and training angles of scrum contact. He did this with the aim of making the France squad for the 2027 Rugby World Cup.

== International career ==
Tolofua made nine appearances for the France national under-20 rugby union team. He made his international Test debut for France against Argentina in Cordoba on 16 June 2012, coming off the bench.

== Personal life ==
Tolofua is the son of Wallis and Futunan parents. Tolofua is the older brother of Selevasio Tolofua, who plays with Toulon as a back row.
