= Nemo Roelofse =

South African rugby union player

- Born: 6 June 1995 (age 31) Riversdale, South Africa
- Height: 182 cm (6 ft 0 in)
- Weight: 120 kg (265 lb; 18 st 13 lb)
- School: Hoër Landbouskool Oakdale
- University: Nelson Mandela University

Rugby union career
- Position: Prop
- Current team: Sharks
Senior career
Years	Team	Apps	(Points)
2016	SWD Eagles		
2016–2017	Albi	19	(0)
2017–2021	Nevers	77	(25)
2021–2023	Stade Français Paris	33	(5)
2023–2026	Perpignan	50	(10)
2026–	Sharks	1	(0)
- Correct as of 26 September 2026

Nemo Roelofse (born 6 June 1995) is a South African rugby union player, who plays for the Sharks. His preferred position is prop.

== Early career ==
Roelofse is from Riversdale, and attended Oakdale High School. Having previously trained in karate, he earned selection for the SWD Eagles Craven Week side in 2013. He remained with the side through their academy and represented the team in the 2015 Vodacom Cup. In 2016, he represented the Nelson Mandela University side in the 2016 Varsity Cup.

== Professional career ==
Roelofse's first professional appearances were for the SWD Eagles in the 2016 Currie Cup First Division. Following the tournament, he headed to France to join Albi, before joining Nevers the following season. In 2021, he headed to the Top 14 were he joined Stade Français Paris with the intention of qualifying for the French national team. He though only remained in Paris for two seasons, before joining Perpignan. He returned to South Africa in 2026, joining the Sharks. He debuted for the Sharks as a replacement in the opening match of the 2026–27 United Rugby Championship season, coming on as a replacement against the Ospreys.
