= 2020 (Richard Dawson album) =

Studio album by Richard Dawson
- Released: 11 October 2019
- Length: 57:53
- Labels: Weird World, Domino Recording Company

Richard Dawson chronology
Peasant (2017)	2020 (2019)	Henki (2021)

2020 is a studio album by avant-garde folk musician Richard Dawson, released on 11 October 2019 by Weird World, an imprint of Domino Recording Company. Like its 2017 predecessor, Peasant, each song on the album is from the perspective of a different fictional narrator. Through these individual perspectives, 2020 explores modern British citizens' broad social attitudes and anxieties. The album's press release describes Britain as "an island country in a state of flux; a society on the edge of mental meltdown".

With the exception of "Dead Dog in an Alleyway", which featured contributions from Sally Pilkington, Nev Clay, and Rhodri Davies, Dawson played all of the instruments on 2020. For the drums, Dawson recorded each instrument individually, which in his estimation resulted in a "stilted" performance. "It’s the first time I’ve used the rock drum sound and I wanted this to appear as a straighter album, but actually it still needs this awkwardness. So how do I get that? Well, maybe I get someone who can’t play drums to play the drums!"

== Critical reception ==
Professional ratings
Review scores
Source	Rating
AllMusic	3.5/5 stars
The Guardian	5/5 stars
Pitchfork	7.8/10
The Quietus	4/5 stars

2020 received acclaim from music critics. At Metacritic, which assigns a normalized rating out of 100 to reviews from mainstream critics, the album received an average score of 82 based on fifteen reviews, indicating "universal acclaim".

Mark Deming of AllMusic highlighted Dawson's lyrics that reflect "the social, political, and economic uncertainty that has swept the globe. But rather than dealing in sloganeering or checking off the familiar outrages that are part of our collective existence, Dawson casts his gaze on the daily lives of ordinary people trying to live their lives despite the fractures in the society around them." Ben Beaumont-Thomas of The Guardian thought that the songs were Palme d'Or-worthy Loachian masterpieces, full of quiet tenacity on an island slowly turning sour."

Writing for The Quietus, Johnny Lamb called 2020 "the most accessible" of Dawson's records and said that the lyricism "wonderful", singling out praise in particular for "Fresher's Ball", which "zooms in on the minutiae of things in a way that seems to extract the greatest emotional impact." Pitchfork likened the album to a short-story collection that can have "an overwhelming, exhausting effect" on the listener, but said that Dawson "wieleded the glut of information in his favor."

== Track listing ==
All tracks are written by Richard Dawson.

No.	Title	Length
1.	"Civil Servant"	6:40
2.	"The Queen's Head"	5:17
3.	"Two Halves"	5:11
4.	"Jogging"	6:38
5.	"Heart Emoji"	4:34
6.	"Black Triangle"	7:59
7.	"Fulfilment Centre"	10:07
8.	"Fresher's Ball"	5:02
9.	"No-One"	0:50
10.	"Dead Dog In An Alleyway"	5:29

== Charts ==
Chart performance for 2020
Chart (2019)	Peak position
Scottish Albums (Official Charts)	30
UK Albums (Official Charts)	54
UK Album Downloads (Official Charts)	40
UK Folk Albums (Official Charts)	20
