= Ali Oz =

French rugby union player

- Born: 28 May 1995 (age 31) Voiron, France
- Height: 1.93 m (6 ft 4 in)
- Weight: 142 kg (22 st 5 lb; 313 lb)

Rugby union career
- Position: Prop
- Current team: Racing 92
Senior career
Years	Team	Apps	(Points)
2015–2019	FC Grenoble	63	(30)
2019-	Racing 92	17	(0)
- Correct as of 13 November 2020

Ali Oz (born 28 May 1995) is a French rugby union player. His position is prop and he currently plays for Racing 92 in the Top 14.

In November 2020 he was called up to the France national team by Fabien Galthié as part of the squad for the Autumn Nations Cup.
