= Selevasio Tolofua =

French rugby union player

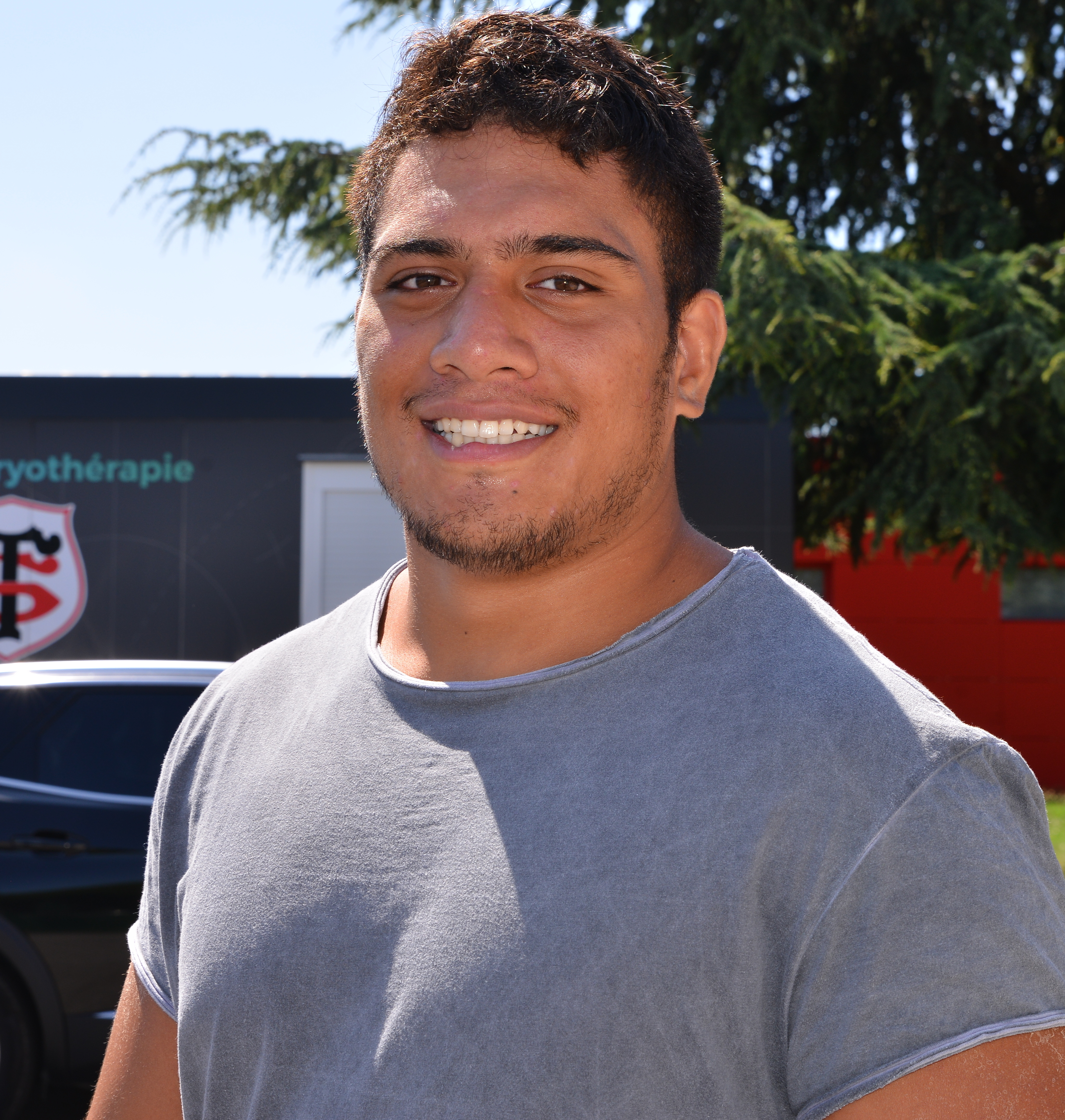
- Tolofua in 2018
- Born: Selevasio Tolofua; 31 May 1997 (age 29) Lille, France
- Height: 1.86 m (6 ft 1 in)
- Weight: 116 kg (18 st 4 lb)
- Notable relative: Christopher Tolofua (brother)

Rugby union career
- Position: Back row
- Current team: Toulon
Youth career
- 2004–2007: Marcq-en-Barœul
- 2007–2016: Toulouse
Senior career
Years	Team	Apps	(Points)
2016–	Toulouse	113	(50)
- Correct as of 17 June 2022
International career
Years	Team	Apps	(Points)
2017	France U20	6	(10)
2020–	France	2	(0)
- Correct as of 2 July 2022

Selevasio Tolofua (born 31 May 1997) is a French rugby union player. His position is in the back row and he currently plays for Toulon in the Top 14.

== Personal life ==
Tolofua comes from a family of four boys, he is the younger brother of Christopher Tolofua, who also started his career with Stade Toulousain. He is of Wallisian heritage.
