= Hayden Thompson-Stringer =

English rugby union player

- Born: Hayden Thompson-Stringer; 29 December 1994 (age 31) Chatham, England
- Height: 1.90 m (6 ft 3 in)
- Weight: 119 kg (262 lb; 18 st 10 lb)
- School: Westlands School, Sittingbourne

Rugby union career
- Position: Loosehead Prop
Amateur team(s)
| Years | Team | Apps | (Points) |
| 2013–2014, 2015 | Old Albanian RFC | 12 | (10) |
- Correct as of 1 September 2018
Senior career
| Years | Team | Apps | (Points) |
| 2013–2019 | Saracens | 47 | (0) |
| 2014–2017 | → Bedford Blues | 40 | (0) |
| 2019–2023 | Brive | 56 | (10) |
| 2023– | La Rochelle | 0 | (0) |
| 2024 | Waratahs | 9 | (0) |
- Correct as of 1 September 2018
International career
| Years | Team | Apps | (Points) |
- England U18
| 2014–2015 | England U20 | 5 | (0) |

Hayden Thompson-Stringer (born 29 December 1994 in Chatham, England) is an English professional rugby union footballer. He plays at prop for Stade Rochelais.
