= Reductionism (music) =

Improvised music genre

Reductionism is a form of improvised music that developed towards the end of the 20th century, centered in Berlin, London, Tokyo, and Vienna. The key characteristics of the music include microtonality, extended techniques, very soft and quiet dynamics, silence, and unconventional sounds and timbres.

Some of the names associated with reductionism are Radu Malfatti, Toshimaru Nakamura, Axel Dörner and Rhodri Davies. The London-based movement has been described as New London Silence.

== See also ==
- Electroacoustic improvisation
- Onkyokei
