= Jérémie Maurouard =

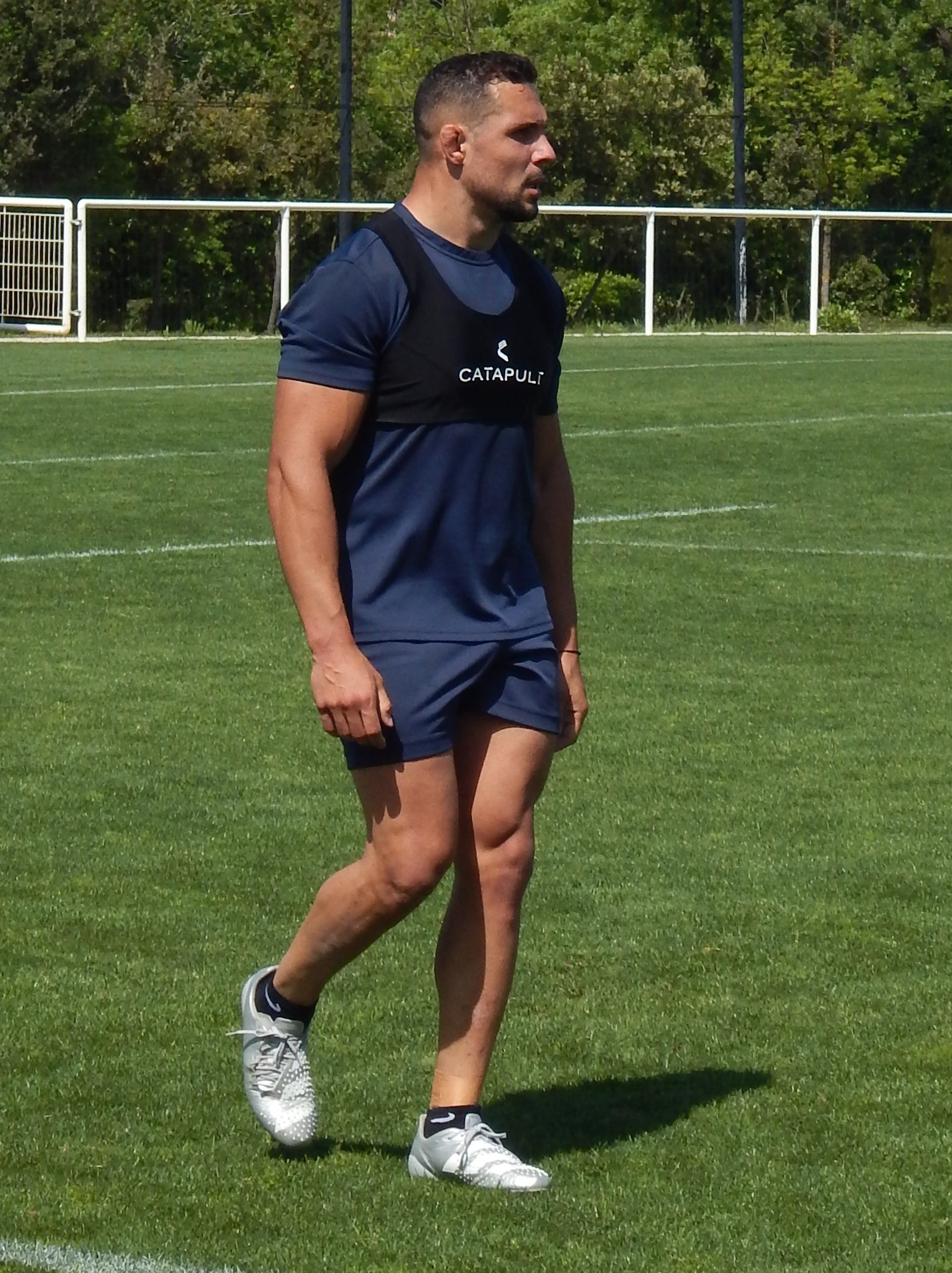
- Born: Jérémie Maurouard; 23 September 1992 (age 34)
- Height: 1.81 m (5 ft 11 in)
- Weight: 99 kg (15 st 8 lb)

Rugby union career
- Position: Hooker
Senior career
Years	Team	Apps	(Points)
2012-2015	Racing Métro	23	(0)
2015-2016	US Oyonnax	27	(25)
2016-2018	Stade Rochelais	42	(35)
2018-	Lyon OU	29	(5)
- Correct as of 12 December 2019

Jérémie Maurouard (born 23 September 1992) is a French professional rugby union player. Since 2018, his regular playing position is as hooker for Lyon OU.
