= Mehdi Tlili =

French rugby union player

- Born: 17 August 2004 (age 22) Meaux, France
- Height: 1.93 m (6 ft 4 in)
- Weight: 100 kg (15 st 10 lb; 220 lb)

Rugby union career
- Position: Flanker
- Current team: Section Paloise
Youth career
- 2016–2019: RC Meaux
- 2019–2023: RC Massy
- 2023–2023: Section Paloise
Senior career
| Years | Team | Apps | (Points) |
| 2023– | Section Paloise | 3 | (5) |
- Correct as of 4 April 2024
International career
| Years | Team | Apps | (Points) |
| 2023– | France U20 | | |
- Correct as of 03 April 2024

Mehdi Tlili (born 17 August 2004) is a France rugby union player who plays as a flanker for Section Paloise in the Top 14 competition. He made his Top 14 debut with his club on 2 December 2023.

== Playing career ==
=== Early career ===
Tlili started rugby for his hometown club in 2016, and then joined Massy as a junior in 2019. Tlili made his professional debut for RC Massy during the 2022–23 Rugby Pro D2 season, featuring in a total of twelve matches, with three starts.

In 2023, Tlili signed with Section Paloise and joined the Top 14 club at the end of the 2022–23 season. Tlili made his Top 14 debut for Section Paloise was against RC Toulon in the 2023–24 Top 14 season.

Mehdi Tlili participated in the 2023–24 Six Nations Under 20s Championship.
