= Peasant (album) =

Studio album by Richard Dawson
- Released: 2 June 2017
- Genre: Progressive folk
- Length: 58:46
- Label: Weird World

Richard Dawson chronology
Nothing Important (2014)	Peasant (2017)	2020 (2019)

Peasant is a studio album by avant-garde folk musician Richard Dawson, released on 2 June 2017 by Weird World. Each song on the album is from the perspective of a different fictional narrator. Although it is set in the Kingdom of Bryneich, from the 400s to the 600s CE, it is intended to be a modern record, the stories and plight of each character largely contain universal themes that connect to the present day.

== Reception ==
Professional ratings
Aggregate scores
Source	Rating
AnyDecentMusic?	8.3/10
Metacritic	82/100
Review scores
Source	Rating
AllMusic	3.5/5 stars
Financial Times	4/5 stars
The Guardian	4/5 stars
Mojo	4/5 stars
Pitchfork	8.0/10
Q	4/5 stars
Record Collector	4/5 stars
Uncut	8/10

Peasant received acclaim from music critics. At Metacritic, which assigns a normalized rating out of 100 to reviews from mainstream critics, the album received an average score of 82 based on eleven reviews, indicating "universal acclaim". The Quietus listed it in first position on their list of the best albums of 2017, and it placed second in The Wire magazine's annual critics' poll. Exclaim! listed it at number 8 on their Top 10 Folk and Country Albums of 2017 list.

In his review of the album for The Quietus, Danny Riley described Peasant as "a work reclaiming meaning of words like "folk" and "community," a complex parable and a force for unification in divisive times" and described Dawson's avant-garde approach to folk music as "more a prickly thicket of brambles than a bed of moistened leaves, with creakily bowed strings, spiky rushes of acoustic guitar and occasional splurges of noise."

== Track listing ==
All tracks are written by Richard Dawson.

No.	Title	Length
1.	"Herald"	2:18
2.	"Ogre"	6:56
3.	"Soldier"	4:52
4.	"Weaver"	5:58
5.	"Prostitute"	4:00
6.	"Shapeshifter"	4:30
7.	"Scientist"	4:48
8.	"Hob"	5:57
9.	"Beggar"	7:24
10.	"No-one"	1:20
11.	"Masseuse"	10:49

== Charts ==
Chart performance for Peasant
Chart (2017)	Peak position
Scottish Albums (Official Charts)	79
UK Independent Albums (Official Charts)	12
