= Pigs Pigs Pigs Pigs Pigs Pigs Pigs =

British rock band

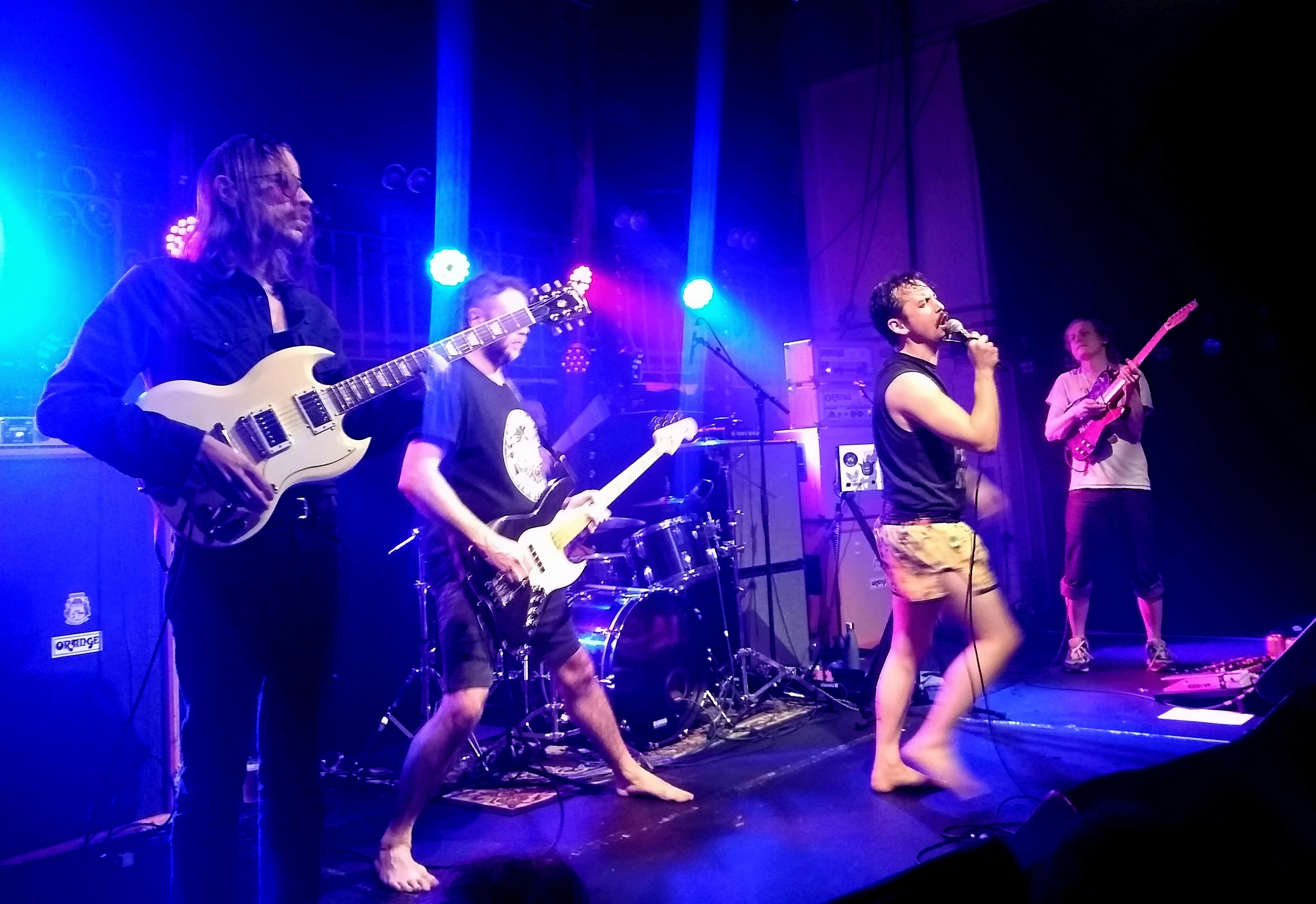
- Pigs x7 performing in Edinburgh, Scotland

Background information
- Also known as: Pigs x7
- Origin: Newcastle upon Tyne, England
- Genres: Heavy metal; stoner metal; hard rock; noise rock
- Years active: 2012–present
- Label: Rocket Recordings
- Members: Matthew Baty; Sam Grant; Adam Ian Sykes; John-Michael Joseph Hedley; Ewan Mackenzie
- Past members: Chris Morley
- Website: pigsx7.com

Pigs Pigs Pigs Pigs Pigs Pigs Pigs, usually shortened to Pigs x7, are a British stoner metal band formed in Newcastle upon Tyne in 2012. Their debut album, Feed the Rats, was released on UK label Rocket Recordings in 2017. The Guardian listed the band as one of their "top 40 newcomers" for 2018, and in 2018 their second album King of Cowards was released, described by The Quietus as an "epic and sprawling record". They practice and record in guitarist Sam Grant's Studio "Blank Studios".

In April 2020, the band released their third album, Viscerals. In May 2020, The Guardian listed the album as one of the twenty best albums released so far that year in their mid-year list. An LP of live tracks, Off Cuts, was released in November 2020 exclusively through Rough Trade's record shops. They announced their fifth studio album Death Hilarious on 20 January 2025, which released 4 April. Sam Grant's father was BBC broadcaster Peter Grant.

== Musical style ==
The band's music has been associated with psych rock and heavy metal, as well as related genres doom metal and noise rock. Earlier releases tended toward longer, drawn out tracks while the more recent releases are predominantly shorter works.

They have cited influences including Black Sabbath, Sleep, Jimi Hendrix, Nirvana, the Stooges, the Pixies, Richard Dawson, Tom Waits, Noothgrush, Motörhead, Hawkwind, Cluster, Faust and At the Drive-In.

== Members ==
Current

- Matthew Baty – lead vocals (2012–present)
- Sam Grant – guitar (2012–present)
- Adam Ian Sykes – lead guitar (2012–present)
- John-Michael Joseph Hedley – bass (2012–present)
- Ewan Mackenzie – drums (2012–2017, 2022–present)

Former

- Chris Morley – drums (2017–2021)

== Discography ==
=== Albums ===
- Feed the Rats (Rocket Recordings, 2017)
- King of Cowards (Rocket Recordings, 2018)
- Viscerals (Rocket Recordings, 2020)
- Land of Sleeper (Rocket Recordings, 2023)
- Live in New York (Rocket Recordings, 2023) (recorded at the Mercury Lounge in New York City)
- Death Hilarious (Rocket Recordings, 2025)

=== Physical singles and EPs ===
- "The Cosmic Dead" / "Pigs Pigs Pigs Pigs Pigs Pigs Pigs" (split 12" single, The Old Noise, 2012)
- Psychopomp (mini-album, Box Records, 2014)
- "Cake of Light" (Rocket Recordings, 2018)
- "GNT" (Rocket Recordings, 2018)
- "Reducer" (Rocket Recordings, 2020)
- "Rubbernecker" (Rocket Recordings, 2020)
- "Hell's Teeth" (Rocket Recordings, 2020)
- "Hot Stuff" (Rocket Recordings, 2021)
