= Richard Dawson (musician) =

English folk musician

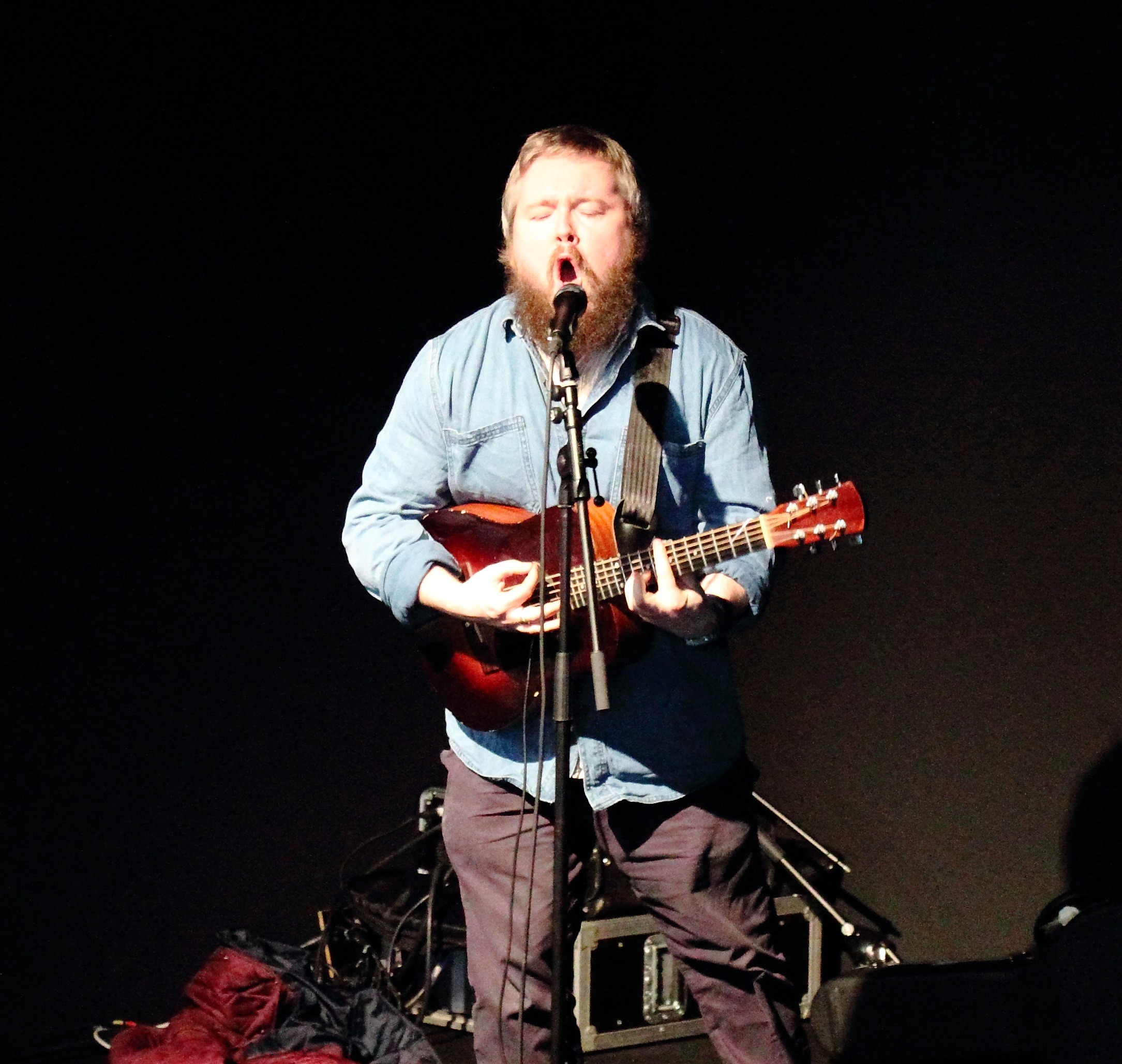
- Dawson performing in 2015

Background information
- Born: 24 May 1981 (age 45)
- Origin: Newcastle upon Tyne, England
- Genres: Progressive folk; freak folk
- Occupation: Singer-songwriter
- Instruments: Vocals; guitar; piano; keyboards; samplers
- Labels: Weird World; Domino
- Website: richarddawson.net

Richard Michael Dawson (born 24 May 1981) is an English progressive folk singer-songwriter from Newcastle upon Tyne. He writes narrative-based folk songs with experimental structures, and has received acclaim for his storytelling capabilities, emotional depth and sense of humour. Alongside his solo career, Dawson is also a member of the experimental pop band Hen Ogledd (alongside Rhodri Davies, Dawn Bothwell and Sally Pilkington), and he has released electronic music under the name Eye Balls.

To date, Dawson has released nine solo studio albums. His 2014 album, Nothing Important, was released by Weird World and was met with critical acclaim. Between 2017 and 2022, Dawson released a loose trilogy of albums – Peasant (2017), 2020 (2019), and The Ruby Cord (2022) – each set within the past, present and future, respectively. The albums received widespread critical acclaim, with The Quietus naming Peasant as their album of the year in 2017.

In 2021, Dawson released Henki, a collaborative album with the Finnish band Circle, which was lyrically influenced by "botanists and plants." The Guardian named it a "botanical rock classic." Dawson released his eighth studio album, End of the Middle, on February 14, 2025, with the album's lyrical content focusing on "several generations of one family, and how patterns of behaviour repeat across them."

== Career ==
Dawson grew up in Newcastle and became interested in singing as a child, attempting to emulate American singers such as Faith No More's Mike Patton. Dawson worked at the Newcastle record stores, JG Windows and Alt.Vinyl, and took on additional bar work for ten years before starting a professional music career. He bought an inexpensive acoustic guitar but accidentally broke it. After the guitar was repaired, he found it had a unique sound and he has used it as his main instrument.

Dawson's music has been described as a deconstruction of folk music, done in an English style, similar to what American Captain Beefheart did with blues music. Dawson himself cites Qawwali, a form of Sufi devotional music, Kenyan folk guitarist Henry Makobi and folk musician Mike Waterson as influences on his work.

In 2008 and 2009, Dawson released 10 albums of computerized electronic music under the pseudonym Eye Balls. The music for this project is long-form ambient drone music, without vocals.

The albums The Glass Trunk (2013) and Nothing Important (2014) feature collaborations with harpist Rhodri Davies, who Dawson describes as "somewhat of a kindred spirit". Dawson and Davies have since also released records as the band Hen Ogledd, and Dawson has also released solo material pseudonymously under the name "Eyeballs". Dawson has also performed in the groups Hot Fog with Mike Vest (Bong), Moon with Ben Jones and Sarah Sullivan (Jazzfinger), and played a handful of shows on guitar with Khunnt.

== Instruments ==
Dawson writes and records on a Baby Taylor guitar that he has owned since his twenties, noting: "Every song I've written since my twenties has been written on that. We're sort of bound. I'm very familiar with it and it is with me." Dawson no longer tours with the guitar after a series of accidents befell the instrument: "There was a minor earthquake in the UK and I'd forgotten I'd put it on the floor, and I stood on it, but it was still playable. The second time I was drunk and I totally caved it in, but it still made a sound of sorts. I thought, 'Well, I'll just play the songs the same, the spirit will still be there even if it sounds terrible.' Then [singer-songwriter] Nev Clay stood on it and totally broke it – it was my fault. A luthier Nigel Forster put a beautiful curved top on it, and it was vastly improved. Then the neck snapped on the first day of the Peasant tour."

Since Nothing Important, Dawson has played his guitars through a Fender and an Orange amplifier in series. He also used synthesized sounds from an iOS application, ThumbJam, and played saxophone despite having only a rudimentary knowledge of the instrument.

== Lyrics and themes ==
Lyrically, Dawson's material deals with dark subjects such as death. For The Glass Trunk, he searched the Tyne and Wear Archives catalogue for "death" and took inspiration from old news stories involving murder and bodily harm. The track "The Vile Stuff" from Nothing Important describes a continuous narrative of events, including one where Dawson pierced his hand with a screwdriver attempting to crack a coconut shell while on a school trip.

== Discography ==
=== Studio albums ===
- Richard Dawson Sings Songs and Plays Guitar (2005)
- The Magic Bridge (2011)
- The Glass Trunk (2013)
- Nothing Important (2014)
- Peasant (2017)
- 2020 (2019)
- Henki (2021) (with Circle)
- The Ruby Cord (2022)
- End of the Middle (2025)

=== Compilations ===
- Republic of Geordieland (2020)

=== As Eye Balls ===
- Europa (2008)
- The Roof of The World (2008)
- Sea of William Henry Smyth (2008)
- Seal-Skin Satellite (2008)
- The Invisible Castle (2009)
- The Quest (2009)
- Thief of Men (2009)
- Treasure (2009)
- Eyeballs/Gareth Hardwick split (2009)
- Eyeballs/White Dwarf Spiral split (2009)

=== with Hen Ogledd ===
- Dawson-Davies: Hen Ogledd with Rhodri Davies (2013)
- Bronze by Hen Ogledd (Richard Dawson, Rhodri Davies and Dawn Bothwell) (2016)
- Mogic by Hen Ogledd (Richard Dawson, Rhodri Davies, Dawn Bothwell, Sally Pilkington, Will Guthrie) (2018)
- Free Humans by Hen Ogledd (Richard Dawson, Rhodri Davies, Dawn Bothwell and Sally Pilkington) (2020)
- No Wood Accepted (EP) by Hen Ogledd (Richard Dawson, Rhodri Davies, Dawn Bothwell and Sally Pilkington) (2021)

=== Collaborations ===
- Dawson May Jazzfinger Clay with Nev Clay, Ally May and Jazzfinger (2009)
- Moon — Diseasing Rock Who with Ben Jones and Sarah Sullivan (2011)

Additionally, over 80 short-form releases with Sally Pilkington as Bulbils since 2020.

=== Soundtracks ===
- Motherland (2008)

=== Appearances ===
- Stick In The Wheel presents From Here: English Folk Field Recordings Volume 2 (2019)
- The Sky Was A Mouth Again (2025)
