= Rhodri Davies (musician) =

British harpist & composer (born 1971)

Rhodri Davies (born December 1971) is a Welsh musician and composer. He is a harp player working within the field of free improvisation. He was one of the most prominent members of the London reductionist school of improvised music that was active in the late 1990s and early 2000s and which has been described as being "extremely influential over the last decade". More recently (2013-present), Davies has been a member of the band Hen Ogledd alongside Dawn Bothwell, Richard Dawson and Sally Pilkington.

Davies is also active in the field of contemporary composition where he has commissioned new works for the harp from leading avant-garde composers. He has also worked as an orchestral player and as a session musician for Charlotte Church and Cinematic Orchestra amongst others. He has appeared on over 60 commercially available recordings.

He has created a number of installations and performances which involve destroying or disassembling the harp. In 2010 he was longlisted for the Northern Arts Prize and in 2012 he received the Foundation for Contemporary Arts Grants to Artists award.

He was a board member of the Huddersfield Contemporary Music Festival (2008-2014) and a trustee of the AV Festival (2010-2015).

== Improvisation ==
Davies started playing the harp at the age of seven and went on to study with Hugh Webb and Sioned Williams. Writing in Coda magazine David Lewis described him as "the most radical" of the harp players working within the field of improvised music as "he approached [the harp] as a sculptural sound object rather than as an established musical tool with a pre-designated musical role." Davies uses preparations such as wine corks along with a variety of beaters and resonators to tease out different timbres from the instrument. He sometimes employs an ebow to induce a harmonic drone.

According to Davies, the reductionist school of improvisation with which he was associated in the late 1990s and early 2000s emerged as a result of "being disinterested in the busy, non-stop, energetic gesture playing. We associated that more with a link to free jazz, remnants of which were in Improv." Critic Ben Watson described Davies' playing as "[Derek] Bailey's guitar writ large, the soundworld of Pierre Boulez shot through with the funk and low humour repartee of the improvisor [sic]".

His collaborators have included David Toop, Max Eastley, Derek Bailey and Evan Parker and he has long-term musical relationships with John Butcher and the groups The Sealed Knot (with Burkhard Beins and Mark Wastell), SLW (with Burkhard Beins, Lucio Capece and Toshimaru Nakamura), Cranc (with Angharad Davies and Nikos Veliotis) and Common Objects (various musicians).

In 2011 he was part of a group of musicians selected to represent the British improvised music scene in a festival entitled "Just Not Cricket" in Berlin which was filmed as the basis for a forthcoming documentary.

Other improvising harpists include Alice Coltrane, Zeena Parkins, Anne Le Baron, Clare Cooper, Helene Breschand and Carol Emanuel.

== New music ==
Davies is also active in the field of contemporary composition and new pieces for harp have been composed for him by leading avant-garde composers including Éliane Radigue, Phill Niblock, Christian Wolff and Ben Patterson. He has performed and recorded the music of Cornelius Cardew and Otomo Yoshihide and is a member of the new music ensemble Apartment House.

He was part of an ensemble selected to interpret new aural scores by Luc Ferrari, David Grubbs and others at Tate Modern in 2005. In 2009 he performed as part of British composer Richard Barrett's ensemble fORCH at the Huddersfield Contemporary Music Festival in a concert recorded for broadcast by BBC Radio 3

He is a co-founder & co-organiser of NAWR, a multidisciplinary concert series in Swansea and Hay-on-Wye of experimental music, free improvisation, film, lo-fi, free jazz, sound art, alternative folk and new music.

== Installations and performance art ==
Davies has had an interest in destruction and creation in relation to the harp which he has explored in several recent performance and installation works. In 2008 he collaborated with the founder of Auto-Destructive Art, Gustav Metzger, on a series of events under the title of "Self-Cancellation" which took place at the Instal Festival in Glasgow and Beaconsfield in London. His performance "Cut and Burn" involved cutting and burning the strings of a concert pedal harp and then restringing the harp. His installation "Room Harp" was exhibited at the Hatton Gallery in Newcastle's Great Northern Museum in 2010.

== Selected discography ==
Davies appears on over 60 published recordings. Besides those listed, Davies also appears on recordings by Charlotte Church, Cinematic Orchestra, Richard Dawson, Apartment House, Zeitkratzer, Otomo Yoshihide, Furt, fORCH, Chris Burn's Ensemble and Simon Fell's SFE. A full discography can be found at European Free Improvisation Pages.

Solo

- Trem (2002), Confront Recordings
- Over Shadows (2004), Confront Recordings

Duo with John Butcher

- Vortices and Angels (2001), Emanem – split CD with Derek Bailey/John Butcher
- Carliol (2010), Ftarri

The Sealed Knot (with Burkhard Beins and Mark Wastell)

- The Sealed Knot (2000), Confront Recordings
- Surface/Plane (2001), Meniscus
- Unwanted Object (2004), Confront Recordings
- And We Disappear (2009), Another Timbre

SLW (with Burkhard Beins, Lucio Capece and Toshimaru Nakamura)

- SLW (2008), Formed
- Fifteen point nine grams (2009), Organized Music from Thessaloniki

Cranc (with Angharad Davies and Nikos Veliotis)

- All Angels (1999), Edo
- Copper Fields, (2010), Organized Music From Thessaloniki

IST (with Simon H Fell and Mark Wastell)

- Anagrams to Avoid (1997), SIWA
- Ghost Notes (1998), Bruce's Fingers
- lodi (2005), Confront

Various Improvising groups

- Malthouse (1999), 2:13 Records – with John Bisset
- Company in Marseille (2001), Incus – with Derek Bailey, Simon H Fell, Will Gaines and Mark Wastell
- Strings with Evan Parker (2001), Emanem – with Evan Parker and various string players
- Ieirll (2005), QBICO – with Ingar Zach
- Done (2007), Quakebasket – with Matt Davis and Mark Wastell
- Cwymp Y Dŵr Ar Ganol Dydd (2006) Confront Recordings – with Traw
- Valved Strings Calculator (2009), Hibari – with Robin Hayward and Taku Unami
- Kravis Rhonn Project (2009), Another Timbre – with Annette Krebs
- Dark Architecture (2009), Another Timbre – with Max Eastley
- Wunderkamern (2010), Another Timbre – with David Toop and Lee Patterson
- ""Cornelius Cardew: Works 1960–70" (2010) with John Tilbury, Michael Francis Duch and Rhodri Davies

== See also ==
- List of free improvising musicians and groups
- Harp
