= Athletics at the 1972 Summer Olympics – Men's javelin throw =

Men's javelin throw at the Games of the XX Olympiad
- Venue: Olympic Stadium
- Dates: September 2, 1972 (qualifications); September 3, 1972 (final)
- Competitors: 23 from 15 nations
- Winning distance: 90.48 OR

Medalists
1st place, gold medalist(s)		Klaus Wolfermann; West Germany
2nd place, silver medalist(s)		Jānis Lūsis; Soviet Union
3rd place, bronze medalist(s)		William Schmidt; United States

The Men's Javelin Throw event at the 1972 Summer Olympics took place on September 2–3 at the Olympic Stadium, Munich. The qualifying standard was 80 m (262 ft 5 1/2 in).

The winning margin was 2 cm which as of June 2025 remains the only time the men's javelin throw was won by less than 10 cm at the Olympics. Also as of June 2025, it is the narrowest winning margin for any javelin competition, women included, at the Olympics, the World Athletics Championships, the European Athletics Championships and the Commonwealth Games.

== Records ==
Prior to this competition, the existing world and Olympic records were as follows:

World record	(Soviet Union) Jānis Lūsis	93.80 m	Stockholm, Sweden	July 6, 1972
Olympic record	Jānis Lūsis (URS)	90.10 m	Mexico City, Mexico	October 16, 1968

== Results ==
=== Qualifying round ===
Rank	Series	Athlete	Nationality	#1	#2	#3	Result	Notes
1	A	Klaus Wolfermann	West Germany	86.22			86.22	Q
2	B	Jānis Lūsis	Soviet Union	82.92			82.92	Q
3	A	Hannu Siitonen	Finland	81.80			81.80	Q
4	B	Miklós Németh	Hungary	70.90	81.78		81.78	Q
5	A	Fred Luke	United States	81.34			81.34	Q
6	B	Manfred Stolle	East Germany	80.78			80.78	Q
7	A	Jorma Kinnunen	Finland	80.10			80.10	Q
8	B	Milt Sonsky	United States	79.96	78.78	74.24	79.96	q
9	B	József Csík	Hungary	79.08	x	x	79.08	q
10	A	William Schmidt	United States	75.28	75.90	78.96	78.96	q
11	A	Lolesio Tuita	France	75.36	78.78	77.34	78.78	q
12	A	Bjørn Grimnes	Norway	x	77.54	x	77.54	q
13	B	Rick Dowswell	Canada	66.54	72.52	77.42	77.42	
14	A	Gergely Kulcsár	Hungary	x	x	77.24	77.24	
15	B	Urs von Wartburg	Switzerland	76.36	x	76.20	76.36	
16	A	André Claude	Canada	75.56	x	x	75.56	
17	B	Dave Travis	Great Britain	74.68	70.10	74.30	74.68	
18	B	Günther Glassauer	West Germany	x	x	73.12	73.12	
19	B	Jacques Abehi	Ivory Coast	72.20	x	x	72.20	
20	A	Renzo Cramerotti	Italy	71.12	x	x	71.12	
21	B	Donald Velez	Nicaragua	x	63.74	x	64.74	
22	A	Abdul Atif Al-Qahtani	Saudi Arabia	x	x	53.06	53.06	
	B	Leo Pusa	Finland	x	x	x	NM	
	A	Edmund Jaworski	Poland				DNS	

=== Finals ===
The eight highest-ranked competitors after three rounds qualified for the final three throws to decide the medals.

Rank	Athlete	Nationality	1	2	3	4	5	6	Result
1st place, gold medalist(s)	Klaus Wolfermann	West Germany	86.68	85.14	x	88.40	90.48	84.70	90.48 OR
2nd place, silver medalist(s)	Jānis Lūsis	Soviet Union	88.88	x	89.54	x	81.66	90.46	90.46
3rd place, bronze medalist(s)	William Schmidt	United States	75.96	84.42	x	79.92	84.12	x	84.42
4	Hannu Siitonen	Finland	84.32	x	x	x	x	x	84.32
5	Bjørn Grimnes	Norway	71.86	82.38	83.08	x	x	x	83.08
6	Jorma Kinnunen	Finland	x	82.08	75.76	x	x	77.60	82.08
7	Miklós Németh	Hungary	80.80	81.98	78.58	81.88	x	81.40	81.98
8	Fred Luke	United States	66.64	x	80.06	79.70	71.46	x	80.06
9	Manfred Stolle	East Germany	x	x	79.32				79.32
10	Milt Sonsky	United States	77.62	77.94	72.38				77.94
11	Lolesio Tuita	France	76.34	x	69.38				76.34
12	József Csík	Hungary	75.52	76.14	x				76.14
