= Athletics at the 1970 Summer Universiade – Men's javelin throw =

The men's javelin throw event at the 1970 Summer Universiade was held at the Stadio Comunale in Turin on 1 and 2 September 1970.

== Medalists ==
Gold	Silver	Bronze
Miklós Németh; Hungary	József Csík; Hungary	Zygmunt Jałoszyński; Poland

== Results ==
=== Qualification ===
Qualifying mark: 70.00 metres

Rank	Heat	Athlete	Nationality	Result	Notes
1	?	Zygmunt Jałoszyński	Poland	73.28	
2	?	Lars Avellan	Finland	73.00	
3	?	Fernando Tallón	Spain	72.92	
4	?	Miklós Németh	Hungary	72.88	
5	?	József Csík	Hungary	72.66	
6	?	Milcho Milevski	Bulgaria	71.28	
7	?	Volker Schell	West Germany	71.12	
8	?	Jānis Doniņš	Soviet Union	70.78	
9	?	Bill Schmidt	United States	70.68	
10	?	Neđo Đurović	Yugoslavia	70.44	
11	?	John McSorley	Great Britain	70.04	
12	?	Günther Glassauer	West Germany	69.08	
13	?	Dezideriu Silaghi	Romania	68.28	
14	?	Renzo Cramerotti	Italy	67.58	
15	?	Don Vélez	Nicaragua	67.36	
16	?	Vanni Rodeghiero	Italy	66.04	
17	?	Helmuth Schönbichler	Austria	64.58	
18	?	Paulo de Faria	Brazil	63.72	
19	?	Mohamed Laid	Algeria	57.26	
20	?	Alex Gusbeth	Australia	50.38	
21	?	A. Fondeur Mencía	Dominican Republic	44.18	
22	?	Ismael Hussein	Kuwait	35.18	

=== Final ===
Rank	Name	Nationality	Result	Notes
1st place, gold medalist(s)	Miklós Németh	Hungary	81.94	
2nd place, silver medalist(s)	József Csík	Hungary	80.32	
3rd place, bronze medalist(s)	Zygmunt Jałoszyński	Poland	79.84	
4	Neđo Đurović	Yugoslavia	76.84	
5	John McSorley	Great Britain	75.96	
6	Bill Schmidt	United States	75.56	
7	Milcho Milevski	Bulgaria	75.54	
8	Fernando Tallón	Spain	75.48	
9	Jānis Doniņš	Soviet Union	75.46	
10	Lars Avellan	Finland	74.48	
11	Günther Glassauer	West Germany	74.10	
12	Volker Schell	West Germany	71.08	
