= Athletics at the 1969 South Pacific Games =

Athletics at the III South Pacific Games
- Dates: August 14–20
- Host city: Port Moresby, Papua and New Guinea (Papua New Guinea)
- Level: Senior
- Events: 34 (22 men, 12 women)
- Participation: 12 nations

Athletics competitions at the 1969 South Pacific Games were held in Port Moresby, Papua and New Guinea, between August 14–20, 1969. Following the event, a "Congress of the delegates of Member Countries of the Australasian Area" was held on August 21, 1969, resulting in the foundation of the Oceania Athletics Association. A total of 34 events were contested, 22 by men and 12 by women.

== Medal summary ==
Medal winners and their results were published on the Athletics Weekly webpage courtesy of Tony Isaacs and Børre Lilloe, and on the Oceania Athletics Association webpage by Bob Snow.

Complete results can also be found on the Oceania Athletics Association webpage.

=== Men ===
Event	Gold		Silver		Bronze	
100 metres (wind: -0.8 m/s)	Jean Bourne (PYF)	10.9	(New Hebrides) Charles Godden (NHB)	11.0	Semi Pulu (TGA)	11.0
200 metres	Jean Bourne (PYF)	21.8	(New Hebrides) Charles Godden (NHB)	22.1	Semi Pulu (TGA)	22.1
400 metres	Saimoni Tamani (FIJ)	48.8	Penisimani Tuipulotu (TGA)	49.3	Joseph Wéjièmé (NCL)	50.1
800 metres	Saimoni Tamani (FIJ)	1:57.3	Osea Malamala (FIJ)	1:58.7	Peceli Tuinakauvadra (FIJ)	1:58.9
1500 metres	(Papua New Guinea) Raka Vele (PNG)	4:08.6	Michel Guepy (NCL)	4:11.9	Peceli Tuinakauvadra (FIJ)	4:12.3
5000 metres	(Papua New Guinea) Phillip Kayo (PNG)	16:02.8	Robert Morgan-Morris (NRU)	16:03.0	Usaia Sotutu (FIJ)	16:05.0
10000 metres	Usaia Sotutu (FIJ)	33:13.2	(Papua New Guinea) Phillip Kayo (PNG)	33:17.0	Robert Morgan-Morris (NRU)	33:17.2
Marathon	Julien Gohe (NCL)	2:49:19	(Papua New Guinea) Gari Vagi (PNG)	2:59:13	Robert Morgan-Morris (NRU)	3:03:10
3000 metres steeplechase	Usaia Sotutu (FIJ)	9:48.8	Nowame Vuto (FIJ)	10:02.0	Tony Bowditch (NRU)	10:09.6
110 metres hurdles	Penisimani Tuipulotu (TGA)	15.0	Charles Tetaria (PYF)	15.7	Jean Salmon (PYF)	15.7
400 metres hurdles	Penisimani Tuipulotu (TGA)	53.6	(Papua New Guinea) Moses Purpuruk (PNG)	55.7	Marcel Blameble (NCL)	56.4
High jump	Jean Salmon (PYF)	1.88	Ludovico Manuafina (WLF)	1.88	Pierre Léontieff-Téahu (PYF)	1.83
Pole vault	Yannick Bonnet de Larbogne (NCL)	4.22	Stanley Drollet (PYF)	4.02	(Papua New Guinea) Joseph Buboi (PNG)	3.66
Long jump	Christian Kaddour (NCL)	7.03	(Solomon Islands) Georges Lepping (SOL)	6.97	Jacques Pothin (NCL)	6.84
Triple jump	Christian Kaddour (NCL)	14.58	(Solomon Islands) George Fafale (SOL)	14.48	(Papua New Guinea) Piewavagi Waea (PNG)	14.37
Shot put	Arnjolt Beer (NCL)	17.89	Martial Bone (NCL)	14.17	Lolésio Tuita (WLF)	13.85
Discus throw	Arnjolt Beer (NCL)	50.22	Martial Bone (NCL)	43.88	William Liga (FIJ)	39.24
Hammer throw	Henri Wetta (NCL)	43.14	Martial Bone (NCL)	43.08	Arnjolt Beer (NCL)	41.84
Javelin throw	Lolésio Tuita (WLF)	72.76	Petelo Wakalina (NCL)	67.90	William Liga (FIJ)	62.28
Decathlon	(Papua New Guinea) Raki Leka (PNG)	6185	Alipeti Latu (TGA)	6010	Charles Tetaria (PYF)	5896
4 x 100 metres relay	New Hebrides; Jean Bai; Yves Rolland; Seru Korikalo; Charles Godden	42.5	Fiji; Alec Eastgate; Roy Thomas; Samuela Yavala; Eliki Nukutabu	42.8	French Polynesia; Jean Salmon; Emile Roche; Alexandre Aunoa; Jean Bourne	42.9
4 x 400 metres relay	Fiji; Saimoni Tamani; Lasarusa Waqa; Samuela Yavala; Osea Malamala	3:19.6	(Territory of New Guinea) Papua and New Guinea; Brother Gough; D. Uvah; Geno Pou; Loko Kilore	3:22.2	New Caledonia; Joseph Wéjièmé; Didier Lacabanne; Marcel Blameble; Honoré Iwa	3:22.9

=== Women ===
Event	Gold		Silver		Bronze	
100 metres	Keta Iongi (TGA)	12.8	(Papua New Guinea) Naomi Taraingal (PNG)	12.9	Torika Varo (FIJ)	13.0
200 metres	Keta Iongi (TGA)	25.7	(New Hebrides) Saria Kaluat (NHB)	25.9	(Papua New Guinea) Naomi Taraingal (PNG)	26.3
400 metres	(Papua New Guinea) Kito Kaida (PNG)	59.1	Torika Varo (FIJ)	59.4	(Papua New Guinea) Salitia Pipit (PNG)	59.5
800 metres	(Papua New Guinea) Salitia Pipit (PNG)	2:22.3	(Papua New Guinea) Kito Kaida (PNG)	2:22.3	Alisi Qalo (FIJ)	2:25.4
80 metres hurdles	Keta Iongi (TGA)	12.1	(Papua New Guinea) Naomi Taraingal (PNG)	12.4	Dominique Chaze (PYF)	12.4
High jump	Henriette Wahuzue (NCL)	1.54	Ines Elocie (NCL)	1.50	Lauria Meindu (NCL)	1.50
Long jump	Miriama Tuisorisori (FIJ)	5.24	(Papua New Guinea) Delilah Exon (PNG)	5.23	Jane Phineas (ASA)	5.16
Shot put	Marie-Claude Wetta (NCL)	12.19	Atanasia Fenuafanote (WLF)	11.77	Eleanor Phillips (FIJ)	11.45
Discus throw	Lois Lax (NRU)	41.42	Mereoni Vibose (FIJ)	38.82	Marie-Claude Wetta (NCL)	36.98
Javelin throw	Élise Poaniewa (NCL)	42.58	Mereoni Vibose (FIJ)	41.70	Soana Simutoga (NCL)	41.56
Pentathlon	Keta Iongi (TGA)	3801	Eleanor Phillips (FIJ)	3742	Yvonne Harry (PYF)	3460
4 x 100 metres relay (Note: Fiji and New Caledonia crossed the line first and second respectively in the women's 4 × 100 metres relay but were disqualified for passing the baton outside the change-over box.)	(Papua New Guinea) Papua and New Guinea; Kito Kaida; Delilah Exon; Asenata Kalamana; Neomi Taraingal	52.0	New Hebrides; Leisdale Mangawai; Lois Hafu; Merilyn-Rose Leo; Saria Kaluat	54.7	Guam; M. Manibusan; I. Cruz; J. Cruz; L. Taitano	56.8

== Medal table (unofficial) ==
* Host nation (Papua New Guinea)

Rank	Nation	Gold	Silver	Bronze	Total
1	New Caledonia (NCL)	10	6	8	24
2	Papua New Guinea (PNG)*	6	8	4	18
3	Fiji (FIJ)	6	7	8	21
4	Tonga (TON)	6	2	2	10
5	French Polynesia (PYF)	3	2	6	11
6	New Hebrides (New Hebrides)	1	4	0	5
7	Wallis and Futuna (WLF)	1	2	1	4
8	Nauru (NRU)	1	1	3	5
9	Solomon Islands (SOL)	0	2	0	2
10	American Samoa (ASA)	0	0	1	1
10	Guam (GUM)	0	0	1	1
Totals (11 entries)		34	34	34	102

== Participation (unofficial) ==
Athletes from 12 countries were reported to participate:

- American Samoa
- British Solomon Islands
- Fiji
- French Polynesia
- Guam
- Nauru
- New Caledonia
- New Hebrides
- (Papua New Guinea) Papua and New Guinea
- Tonga
- Wallis and Futuna
- Western Samoa
