= Athletics at the 1966 South Pacific Games =

Athletics at the II South Pacific Games
- Dates: 10-13 December
- Host city: Nouméa, New Caledonia
- Level: Senior
- Events: 31 (20 men, 11 women)
- Participation: 13 nations

Athletics competitions at the 1966 South Pacific Games were held in Nouméa, New Caledonia, between 10 and 13 December 1966.

A total of 31 events were contested, 20 by men and 11 by women.

== Medal summary ==
Medal winners and their results were published on the Athletics Weekly webpage courtesy of Tony Isaacs and Børre Lilloe, and on the Oceania Athletics Association webpage by Bob Snow.

Complete results can also be found on the Oceania Athletics Association webpage by Bob Snow.

=== Men ===
| Event | Gold | | Silver | | Bronze | |
|---|---|---|---|---|---|---|
| 100 metres (wind: -2.5 m/s) | Jacques Pothin (NCL) | 11.2/11.29 | (Papua New Guinea) Aphmelody Kaumatua (PNG) | 11.3 | Kalivate Cavuilati (FIJ) | 11.5 |
| 200 metres | Jean Bourne (PYF) | 22.4/22.52 | (Papua New Guinea) Bruce Richter (PNG) | 22.6 | Sitiveni Moceidreke (FIJ) | 22.8 |
| 400 metres | Didier Lacabanne (NCL) | 50.2 | (Papua New Guinea) Damian Midi (PNG) | 50.9 | Lasarusa Waqa (FIJ) | 51.3 |
| 800 metres | Ellia Humuni (NCL) | 2:00.5 | (Papua New Guinea) William Wellbourne (PNG) | 2:00.8 | Osea Malamala (FIJ) | 2:02.4 |
| 1500 metres | (Australia) Tony Bowditch (NRU) | 4:07.9 | Peceli Tuinakauvadra (FIJ) | 4:08.7 | Kalivate Raciri (FIJ) | 4:08.9 |
| 5000 metres | (Australia) Robert Morgan-Morris (NRU) | 15:44.8 | Danny Schuster (SAM) | 16:19.1 | (Papua New Guinea) Livingstone Tabua (PNG) | 16:23.7 |
| 10000 metres | (Australia) Robert Morgan-Morris (NRU) | 33:04.6 | Usaia Sotutu (FIJ) | 33:24.7 | Julien Gohe (NCL) | 34:19.2 |
| 3000 metres steeplechase | Usaia Sotutu (FIJ) | 9:59.2 | (Australia) Tony Bowditch (NRU) | 10:01.0 | Michel Guepy (NCL) | 10:08.8 |
| 110 metres hurdles | Penisimani Tuipulotu (TGA) | 15.3 | Charles Tetaria (PYF) | 15.6 | Marcel Blameble (NCL) | 16.1 |
| 400 metres hurdles | Marcel Blameble (NCL) | 54.7 | (Papua New Guinea) William Wellbourne (PNG) | 56.0 | Honoré Iwa (NCL) | 56.9 |
| High jump | Jean Salmon (PYF) | 1.90 | Alexandre Léontieff-Téahu (PYF) | 1.90 | Ludovico Manuafina (WLF) | 1.86 |
| Pole vault | Bernard Balastre (PYF) | 4.15 | Stanley Drollet (PYF) | 4.10 | Yannick Bonnet de Larbogne (NCL) | 4.10 |
| Long jump | Charles Tetaria (PYF) | 7.31 (wind: -2.0 m/s) | Jacques Pothin (NCL) | 7.14 | Jone Lesumaiuma (FIJ) | 7.08 |
| Triple jump | Christian Kaddour (NCL) | 14.70 (wind: +1.4 m/s) | (Solomon Islands) Georges Lepping (SOL) | 14.21 | (Solomon Islands) Vincent Biri (SOL) | 13.97 |
| Shot put | Arnjolt Beer (NCL) | 15.82 | Martial Bone (NCL) | 14.72 | Adonio Tokawa (NCL) | 14.02 |
| Discus throw | Mesulame Rakuro (FIJ) | 45.12 | Arnjolt Beer (NCL) | 44.68 | Henri Wetta (NCL) | 40.06 |
| Hammer Throw | Henri Wetta (NCL) | 38.58 | James Deane (PYF) | 37.86 | Martial Bone (NCL) | 35.70 |
| Javelin throw | Petelo Wakalina (NCL) | 69.14 | William Liga (FIJ) | 66.30 | Unango Watha (NCL) | 59.34 |
| 4 x 100 metres relay | (Papua New Guinea) Papua and New Guinea; Placid Walekwate; Aphmeledy Kaumatua; Silas Tita; Bruce Richter | 43.0/42.80 | Fiji; Kalivate Cavuilati; Roy Thomas; Jone Lesu; Rupeni Ravonu | 43.0/42.81 | French Polynesia; Marcel Thunot; Charles Tetaria; Anatole Teai; Jean Bourne | 43.7 |
| 4 x 400 metres relay | Fiji; Amani Racule; Osea Malamala; Lasarusa Waqa; Saimoni Tamani | 3:24.08 | New Caledonia; Honore Iwa; Alexandre Yekawéné; Marcel Blaméble; Didier Lacabanne & (Papua New Guinea) Papua and New Guinea; Eliab Wuate; Peter Tavip; William Wellbourne; Damien Midi | 3:27.27 | Not awarded as New Caledonia & Papua New Guinea were tied for the silver medal | |

=== Women ===
| Event | Gold | | Silver | | Bronze | |
|---|---|---|---|---|---|---|
| 100 metres (wind: -1.4 m/s) | Torika Varo (FIJ) | 12.87 | Ana Ramacake (FIJ) | 13.12 | (Papua New Guinea) Naomi Taraingal (PNG) | 13.34 |
| 200 metres | Torika Varo (FIJ) | 25.3/25.52 | Ana Ramacake (FIJ) | 26.5 | Monique Lacombe (NCL) | 26.8 |
| 400 metres | Iona Mitchell (FIJ) | 62.8/62.88 | Géraldine Bigourd (NCL) | 63.0 | Madeleine Frebault (PYF) | 63.6 |
| 800 metres | Sulueti Macuku (FIJ) | 2:25.2 | (Papua New Guinea) Bernadette Namal (PNG) | 2:25.5 | Géraldine Bigourd (NCL) | 2:26.7 |
| 80 metres hurdles (wind: -6.0 m/s) | Shirley Heffernan (FIJ) | 12.86 | (Australia) Lois Lax (NRU) | 12.88 | Yvonne Ukeiwe (NCL) | 12.92 |
| High jump | Annemarie Vakoume (NCL) | 1.52 | Eleanor Phillips (FIJ) | 1.52 | Lauria Meindu (NCL) | 1.47 |
| Long jump | Ana Ramacake (FIJ) | 5.51 w (wind: +2.8 m/s) | Yolande Temeharo (PYF) | 5.10 (wind: +1.9 m/s) | Torika Varo (FIJ) | 5.09 |
| Shot put | Akisi Naimotu (FIJ) | 12.17 | Marie-Claude Wetta (NCL) | 11.81 | Losaline Faka'ata (TGA) | 11.46 |
| Discus throw | (Australia) Lois Lax (NRU) | 42.32 | Merewai Turukawa (FIJ) | 35.38 | Claude Maitere (PYF) | 34.32 |
| Javelin throw | Evelyne Poa-Matha (NCL) | 40.40 | Sophie Kamen-Milot (NCL) | 40.10 | Natalia Tufele (WLF) | 38.68 |
| 4 x 100 metres relay | Fiji; Ulamila Toroki; Torika Varo; Iona Mitchell; Ana Ramacake | 49.6 | New Caledonia; Monique Lacombe; Arlette Kopoui; Eseta Deuwi Arii; Annemarie Benjamin | 50.5 | (Papua New Guinea) Papua and New Guinea; Meriba Wika; Naomi Taraingal; Delilah Exon; Navo Anisa | 52.9 |

== Medal table (unofficial) ==
* Host nation (New Caledonia)

| Rank | Nation | Gold | Silver | Bronze | Total |
|---|---|---|---|---|---|
| 1 | Fiji (FIJ) | 11 | 8 | 7 | 26 |
| 2 | New Caledonia (NCL)* | 10 | 8 | 13 | 31 |
| 3 | French Polynesia (PYF) | 4 | 5 | 3 | 12 |
| 4 | Australia (AUS) | 4 | 2 | 0 | 6 |
| 5 | Papua New Guinea (PNG) | 1 | 7 | 3 | 11 |
| 6 | Tonga (TON) | 1 | 0 | 1 | 2 |
| 7 | Solomon Islands (SOL) | 0 | 1 | 1 | 2 |
| 8 | Western Samoa (WSM) | 0 | 1 | 0 | 1 |
| 9 | Wallis and Futuna (WLF) | 0 | 0 | 2 | 2 |
| Totals (9 entries) | | 31 | 32 | 30 | 93 |

== Participation (unofficial) ==
Athletes from 13 countries were reported to participate:

- British Solomon Islands
- (New Zealand) Cook Islands
- Fiji
- French Polynesia
- Gilbert and Ellice Islands
- Guam
- (Australia) Nauru
- New Caledonia
- New Hebrides
- (Papua New Guinea) Papua and New Guinea
- Tonga
- Wallis and Futuna
- Western Samoa
