= Athletics at the 1971 South Pacific Games =

Athletics at the IV South Pacific Games
- Dates: September 9-15
- Host city: Pirae, French Polynesia
- Venue: Stade Pater Te Hono Nui
- Level: Senior
- Events: 35 (22 men, 13 women)
- Participation: 13 nations

Athletics competitions at the 1971 South Pacific Games were held at the Stade Pater Te Hono Nui in Pirae, French Polynesia, between September 9-15, 1971.

A total of 35 events were contested, 22 by men and 13 by women.

== Medal summary ==
Medal winners and their results were published on the Athletics Weekly webpage courtesy of Tony Isaacs and Børre Lilloe, and on the Oceania Athletics Association webpage by Bob Snow.

Complete results can also be found on the Oceania Athletics Association webpage.

=== Men ===
Event	Gold		Silver		Bronze	
100 metres (wind: 0.0 m/s)	Joseph Wéjièmé (NCL)	10.7	Jean Bourne (PYF)	10.7	Alexandre Aunoa (PYF)	10.8
200 metres (wind: +0.7 m/s)	Jean Bourne (PYF)	22.0	Samuela Yavala (FIJ)	22.1	(Papua New Guinea) Paul Maraga (PNG)	22.4
400 metres	Samuela Yavala (FIJ)	48.2	Saimoni Jioji (FIJ)	49.3	(Papua New Guinea) Goa Koiti (PNG)	50.0
800 metres	(Papua New Guinea) Phillip Kayo (PNG)	1:54.1	(Solomon Islands) Barry Morgan (SOL)	1:55.4	Samuela Bulai (FIJ)	1:55.5
1500 metres	Samuela Bulai (FIJ)	4:03.5	(Papua New Guinea) Raka Vele (PNG)	4:03.8	Alain Julien (NCL)	4:09.0
5000 metres	Usaia Sotutu (FIJ)	15:15.4	(Papua New Guinea) Ala Loi (PNG)	15:20.4	(Papua New Guinea) John Kokinai (PNG)	15:34.8
10000 metres	Usaia Sotutu (FIJ)	32:14.6	(Papua New Guinea) Ala Loi (PNG)	32:33.8	(Papua New Guinea) Tom Brandt (PNG)	32:43.4
Marathon	André Petersen (NCL)	2:50:50	(Papua New Guinea) Tom Brandt (PNG)	2:51:59	(Papua New Guinea) Gari Vagi (PNG)	2:53:53
3000 metres steeplechase	Usaia Sotutu (FIJ)	9:24.0	(Papua New Guinea) John Kokinai (PNG)	9:31.2	(Papua New Guinea) Ala Loi (PNG)	9:35.8
110 metres hurdles (wind: 0.0 m/s)	Penisimani Tuipulotu (TGA)	14.6	(Papua New Guinea) Raki Leka (PNG)	15.1	Charles Tetaria (PYF)	15.1
400 metres hurdles	Penisimani Tuipulotu (TGA)	52.9	Marcel Blameble (NCL)	53.9	(Papua New Guinea) Moses Purpuruk (PNG)	54.4
High jump	Pierre Léontieff-Téahu (PYF)	2.06	Paul Poaniewa (NCL)	2.06	Jean Salmon (PYF)	1.98
Pole vault	Stanley Drollet (PYF)	4.40	Bernard Balastre (PYF)	4.20	Yannick Bonnet de Larbogne (NCL)	4.10
Long jump	(Papua New Guinea) Kila Raula (PNG)	7.11	Léonard Angexetine (NCL)	6.96	Christian Kaddour (NCL)	6.91
Triple jump	(Papua New Guinea) Piewavagi Waea (PNG)	15.01	Bula Tora (FIJ)	14.80	Léonard Angexetine (NCL)	14.74
Shot put	Arnjolt Beer (NCL)	18.07	William Buchanan (GUM)	15.97	Lolésio Tuita (WLF)	14.52
Discus throw	Arnjolt Beer (NCL)	49.98	Martial Bone (NCL)	49.06	William Buchanan (GUM)	44.08
Hammer throw	Martial Bone (NCL)	48.38	(Papua New Guinea) John Warnock (PNG)	44.66	Arnjolt Beer (NCL)	44.00
Javelin throw	Lolésio Tuita (WLF)	71.10	Steven Vairaaroa (PYF)	64.48	(New Hebrides) Talper Nial (NHB)	62.40
Decathlon	Charles Tetaria (PYF)	6556	(Papua New Guinea) Raki Leka (PNG)	6426	Sanitesi Latu (TGA)	6328
4 x 100 metres relay	French Polynesia; Jean Salmon; Alexandre Aunoa; Jean Bourne; Charles Tetaria	41.8	Fiji; Jone Soro; Roy Thomas; Samuela Yavala; Tony Moore	41.8	(Papua New Guinea) Papua and New Guinea; Paul Maraga; Silas Tita; Kila Raula; John McCubbery	42.7
4 x 400 metres relay	Fiji; Seru Gukilau; Saimoni Jioji; Usaia Sotutu; Samuela Yavala	3:18.5	(Papua New Guinea) Papua and New Guinea; Moses Purpuruk; Goa Koite; John McCubbery; Phillip John Kayo	3:19.6	New Caledonia; Yannick Blanc; Alain Julien; Patrick Ardimani; Marcel Blameble	3:25.3

=== Women ===
Event	Gold		Silver		Bronze	
100 metres (wind: -3.5 m/s)	Keta Iongi (TGA)	12.9	(Papua New Guinea) Salitia Pipit (PNG)	12.9	Danièle Guyonnet (PYF)	13.0
200 metres	(Papua New Guinea) Salitia Pipit (PNG)	25.8	Miriama Tuisorisori (FIJ)	25.8	Keta Iongi (TGA)	26.0
400 metres	(Papua New Guinea) Salitia Pipit (PNG)	58.1	Make Liku (FIJ)	59.4	(Papua New Guinea) Gaet Nim (PNG)	59.4
800 metres	(Papua New Guinea) Salitia Pipit (PNG)	2:31.1	(Solomon Islands) Lucia Likonia (SOL)	2:31.4	(Solomon Islands) Elisabeth Tito (SOL)	2:34.3
1500 metres	Make Liku (FIJ)	5:11.3	Seini Debui (FIJ)	5:11.7	(Solomon Islands) Lucia Likonia (SOL)	5:12.8
100 metres hurdles (wind: 0.0 m/s)	Danièle Guyonnet (PYF)	15.0	Keta Iongi (TGA)	15.2	Miriama Tuisorisori (FIJ)	15.4
High jump	Henriette Wahuzue (NCL)	1.58	Ines Elocie (NCL)	1.53	Danièle Guyonnet (PYF)	1.51
Long jump	Ines Elocie (NCL)	5.45	(Papua New Guinea) Nancy Kennedy (PNG)	5.39	Miriama Tuisorisori (FIJ)	5.36
Shot put	Marie-Claude Wetta (NCL)	12.60	(Papua New Guinea) Lavah Tingdai (PNG)	11.86	Atanasia Fenuafanote (WLF)	11.61
Discus throw	Marie-Claude Wetta (NCL)	38.62	Danielle Sakoumory (NCL)	34.82	(New Hebrides) Didin Kaltakae (NHB)	33.72
Javelin throw	Soana Simutoga (NCL)	42.16	Marguerite Wabet (NCL)	40.82	(Papua New Guinea) Kuniguda Namur (PNG)	39.14
Pentathlon	Miriama Tuisorisori (FIJ)	3389	(Papua New Guinea) Meg Taylor (PNG)	3386	Eleanor Phillips (FIJ)	3383
4 x 100 metres relay	Fiji; Lili Bola; Miriama Tuisorisori; Torika Cavuka; Eleanor Phillips	49.4	New Caledonia; Louise Kauma; Ines Elocie; Pierette Barthelemy; Sylviane Cailleux	49.6	(Papua New Guinea) Papua and New Guinea; Salitia Pipit; Gaet Nim; Meg Taylor; Nancy Kennedy	50.4

== Medal table (unofficial) ==
* Host nation (French Polynesia)

Rank	Nation	Gold	Silver	Bronze	Total
1	New Caledonia	10	8	6	24
2	Fiji	9	7	4	20
3	Papua New Guinea	6	13	11	30
4	French Polynesia*	6	3	5	14
5	Tonga	3	1	2	6
6	Wallis and Futuna	1	0	2	3
7	Solomon Islands	0	2	2	4
8	Guam	0	1	1	2
9	New Hebrides	0	0	2	2
Totals (9 entries)		35	35	35	105

== Participation (unofficial) ==
Athletes from 13 countries were reported to participate:

- American Samoa
- British Solomon Islands
- (New Zealand) Cook Islands
- Fiji
- French Polynesia
- Gilbert and Ellice Islands
- Guam
- New Caledonia
- New Hebrides
- (Papua New Guinea) Papua and New Guinea
- Tonga
- Wallis and Futuna
- Western Samoa
