= Athletics at the 1975 South Pacific Games =

1975 athletics competitions in Guam

Athletics at the V South Pacific Games
- Dates: August 4–9
- Host city: Tumon, Guam
- Level: Senior
- Events: 35 (22 men, 13 women)
- Participation: 12 nations

Athletics competitions at the 1975 South Pacific Games were held in Tumon, Guam, between August 4–9, 1975.

A total of 35 events were contested, 22 by men and 13 by women.

== Medal summary ==
Medal winners and their results were published on the Athletics Weekly webpage courtesy of Tony Isaacs and Børre Lilloe, and on the Oceania Athletics Association webpage by Bob Snow.

Complete results can also be found on the Oceania Athletics Association webpage.

=== Men ===
Event	Gold		Silver		Bronze	
100 metres (wind: 0.0 m/s)	(Solomon Islands) Jim Marau (SOL)	11.05	Joseph Wéjièmé (NCL)	11.06	Jean Bourne (PYF)	11.10
200 metres	Joseph Wéjièmé (NCL)	21.70	Jean Bourne (PYF)	22.11	(Solomon Islands) Jim Marau (SOL)	22.18
400 metres	Wavala Kali (PNG)	48.91	(Solomon Islands) Valentine Wale (SOL)	49.90	Yannick Blanc (NCL)	50.13
800 metres	Richard Kermode (FIJ)	1:57.33	(Papua New Guinea) Paul Maraga (PNG)	1:58.77	Alain Julien (NCL)	1:59.06
1500 metres	Usaia Sotutu (FIJ)	4:04.41	Wallace Hofogao (PNG)	4:04.74	Trevor Corke (PNG)	4:05.98
5000 metres	(Papua New Guinea) John Kokinai (PNG)	15:01.02	(Papua New Guinea) Mike Joyce (PNG)	15:15.20	Alain Lazare (NCL)	15:16.12
10000 metres	John Kokinai (PNG)	32:01.25	Alain Lazare (NCL)	32:25.07	Usaia Sotutu (FIJ)	32:58.94
Marathon	Alain Lazare (NCL)	2:36:35	(Papua New Guinea) John Kokinai (PNG)	2:37:24	Yannick Moglia (NCL)	2:43:38
3000 metres steeplechase	(Papua New Guinea) John Kokinai (PNG)	9:29.4	Usaia Sotutu (FIJ)	9:51.4	Michel Guepy (NCL)	10:25.3
110 metres hurdles	Sanitesi Latu (TGA)	15.40	Sakaraia Tuva (FIJ)	15.55	(Papua New Guinea) Iroa Pamoa (PNG)	15.85
400 metres hurdles	Joe Rodan (FIJ)	54.70	Henri Brillant (PYF)	55.60	Marcel Blameble (NCL)	55.69
High jump	Clément Poaniewa (NCL)	2.10	Paul Poaniewa (NCL)	2.08	Pierre Léontieff-Téahu (PYF)	1.98
Pole vault	Pierre Larue (NCL)	4.00	Stanley Drollet (PYF)	3.80	Otilio D'Almeida (NCL); Alipeti Latu (TGA)	3.80
Long jump	Tony Moore (FIJ)	7.36	Eric Bellenguez (NCL)	6.86	(Papua New Guinea) Evan Iewago (PNG)	6.84
Triple jump	Yannick Talon (NCL)	15.42	Clément Poaniewa (NCL)	14.74	Bula Tora (FIJ)	14.72
Shot put	Arnjolt Beer (NCL)	18.07	Martial Bone (NCL)	15.99	Jean-Claude Duhaze (PYF)	15.87
Discus throw	Arnjolt Beer (NCL)	48.30	Martial Bone (NCL)	46.88	Jean-Claude Duhaze (PYF)	40.70
Hammer throw	Martial Bone (NCL)	46.70	Arnjolt Beer (NCL)	43.66	Jean-Claude Duhaze (PYF)	37.50
Javelin throw	Lolésio Tuita (WLF)	73.20	Penisio Lutui (WLF)	70.28	Steven Vairaaroa (PYF)	65.20
Decathlon	Sanitesi Latu (TGA)	5576	Alipeti Latu (TGA)	5153	Bula Tora (FIJ)	4677
4 x 100 metres relay	New Caledonia; Alexis Kicine; Jean-Marc Fouche; Éric Bellenguez; Joseph Wéjièmé	42.09	British Solomon Islands; Casper Luiramo; Jasper Anisi; Valentine Wale; Jim Marau	42.46	French Polynesia; Joseph Kiou; Émile Roche; Alexandre Aunoa; Jean Bourne	42.48
4 x 400 metres relay	New Caledonia; Alain Julien; Jean-Marc Martin; Marcel Blameble; Yannick Blanc	3:23.63	Fiji; Bula Tora; Richard Kermode; Samuela Bulai; Joe Rodan	3:24.93	British Solomon Islands; William Atkin Fakaia; Jim Marau; Jasper Anisi; Valentine Wale	3:25.11

=== Women ===
Event	Gold		Silver		Bronze	
100 metres	Miriama Tuisorisori Chambault (FIJ)	12.63	(New Hebrides) Georgette Delaplane (NHB)	12.68	Brigitte Hardel (NCL)	12.85
200 metres	Miriama Tuisorisori Chambault (FIJ)	25.74	(New Hebrides) Georgette Delaplane (NHB)	25.74	Brigitte Hardel (NCL)	25.98
400 metres	Brigitte Hardel (NCL)	58.51	Make Liku (FIJ)	59.06	Armelle Tefana (PYF)	59.98
800 metres	Make Liku (FIJ)	2:20.85	Rusila Radinibeqa (FIJ)	2:21.37	(Papua New Guinea) Mo'uro Kaida (PNG)	2:21.37
1500 metres	Rusila Radinibega (FIJ)	4:56.96	(Papua New Guinea) Mo'uro Kaida (PNG)	4:57.60	Make Liku (FIJ)	5:04.55
100 metres hurdles	Danièle Guyonnet (PYF)	14.96	Miriama Tuisorisori Chambault (FIJ)	15.04	(Papua New Guinea) Naomi Taraingal (PNG)	16.13
High jump	Danièle Guyonnet (PYF)	1.78	(New Hebrides) Josina Tell-Riquet (NHB)	1.51	Miriama Chambault (FIJ)	1.45
Long jump	Miriama Tuisorisori Chambault (FIJ)	5.61	Elesi Ramoa (FIJ)	5.29	Danièle Guyonnet (PYF)	5.28
Shot put	Georgette Paouro (NCL)	10.82	Marie-Claude Tchibaoh (NCL)	10.53	(New Hebrides) Georgette Delaplane (NHB)	10.42
Discus throw	Lili Bola (FIJ)	34.02	Marie-Claude Tchibaoh (NCL)	33.50	Mereoni Vibose (FIJ)	32.48
Javelin throw	Mereoni Vibose (FIJ)	44.32	Georgette Paouro (NCL)	43.16	Marie Poaniewa (NCL)	41.38
Pentathlon	Danièle Guyonnet (PYF)	3703	Miriama Tuisorisori Chambault (FIJ)	3673	Elesi Ramoa (FIJ)	2733
4 x 100 metres relay	French Polynesia; Lucie Bernardino; Armelle Tefana; Danielle Guyonnet; Tatiana Bennett	49.50	Fiji; Torika Cavuka; Melika Modro; Elesi Ramoa; Miriama Tuisorisori Chambault	49.82	New Hebrides; Leilong Kara; Jacinthe Aissau; Josina Tell-Riquet; Georgette Delaplane	50.00

== Medal table (unofficial) ==
Rank	Nation	Gold	Silver	Bronze	Total
1	New Caledonia	12	11	10	33
2	Fiji	11	9	7	27
3	Papua New Guinea	4	5	5	14
4	French Polynesia	4	3	9	16
5	Tonga	2	1	1	4
6	Solomon Islands	1	2	2	5
7	Wallis and Futuna	1	1	0	2
8	New Hebrides	0	3	2	5
Totals (8 entries)		35	35	36	106

== Participation (unofficial) ==
Athletes from the following 12 countries were reported to participate:

- British Solomon Islands
- Fiji
- French Polynesia
- Guam
- (Trust Territory of the Pacific Islands) Micronesia
- Nauru
- New Caledonia
- New Hebrides
- (Papua New Guinea) Papua and New Guinea
- Tonga
- Wallis and Futuna
- Western Samoa
