= Lassi Etelätalo =

Finnish javelin thrower (born 1988)

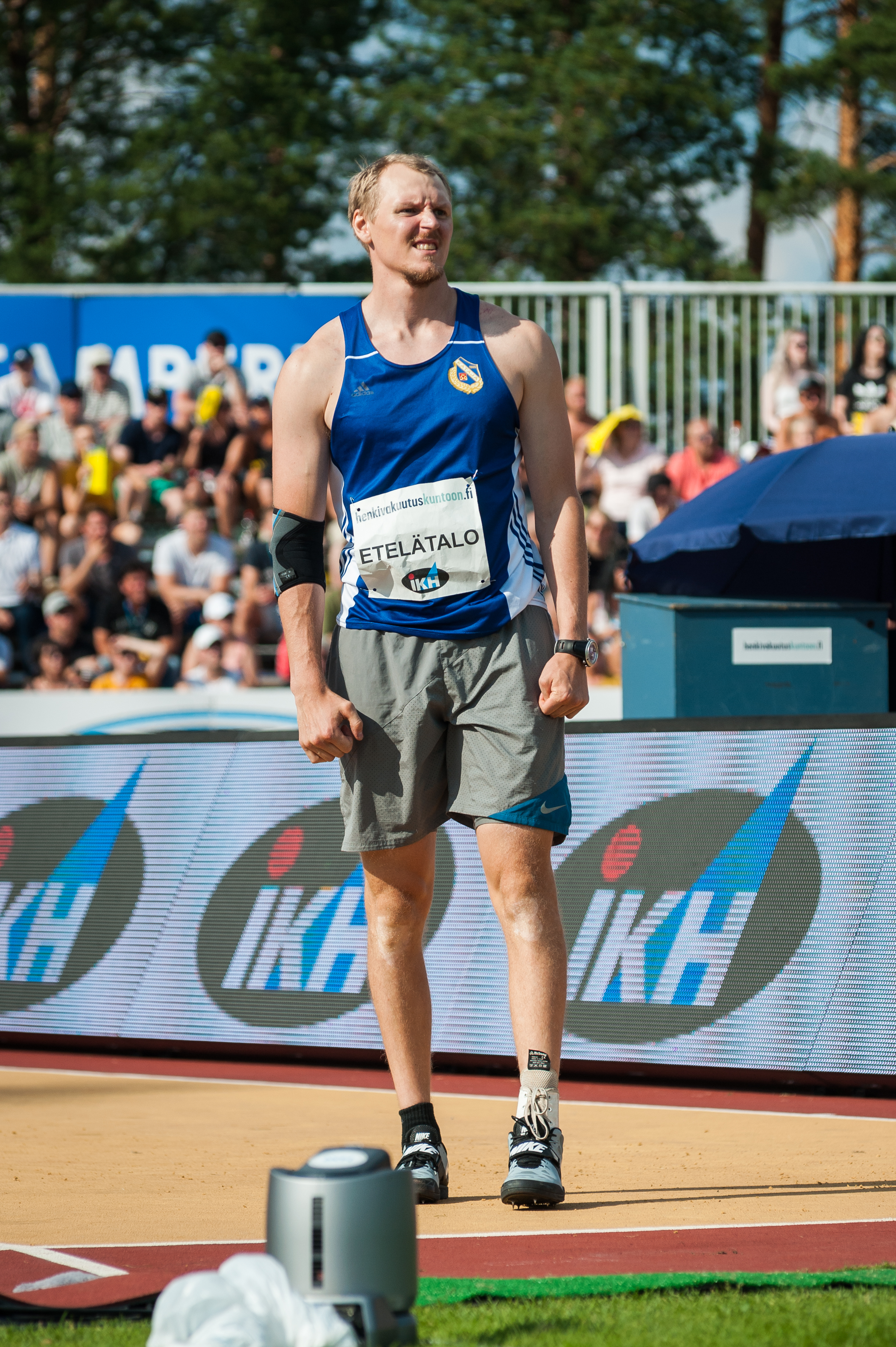
- Lassi Etelätalo in 2018

Personal information
- Born: 30 April 1988 (age 38)
- Height: 1.93 m (6 ft 4 in)
- Weight: 90 kg (198 lb)

Sport
- Sport: Athletics
- Event: Javelin throw
- Club: Joensuun Kataja
- Coached by: Leo Pusa
Medal record
Men's athletics
Representing Finland
European Championships
Bronze medal – third place	2022 Munich	Javelin throw

Lassi Etelätalo (born 30 April 1988) is a Finnish athlete specialising in the javelin throw. He represented his country at the 2019 World Championships in Doha finishing fourth in the final. In addition, he also finished fourth at the 2014 European Championships in Zürich.

His personal best in the event is 86.44 metres set in Munich in 2022.

== International competitions ==
Year	Competition	Venue	Position	Event	Notes
Representing Finland
2007	European Junior Championships	Hengelo, Netherlands	15th (q)	Javelin throw	66.88 m
2009	European U23 Championships	Kaunas, Lithuania	9th	Javelin throw	75.21 m
2014	European Championships	Zürich, Switzerland	4th	Javelin throw	83.16 m
2019	World Championships	Doha, Qatar	4th	Javelin throw	82.49 m
2021	Olympic Games	Tokyo, Japan	8th	Javelin throw	83.28 m
2022	World Championships	Oregon, United States	6th	Javelin throw	82.70 m
2022	European Championships	Munich, Germany	3rd	Javelin throw	86.44 m
2023	World Championships	Budapest, Hungary	18th (q)	Javelin throw	78.19 m
2024	European Championships	Rome, Italy	6th	Javelin throw	82.80 m
2024	Olympic Games	Paris, France	8th	Javelin throw	84.58 m
2025	World Championships	Tokyo, Japan	17th (q)	Javelin throw	81.33 m
