= Salitia Pipit =

Papua New Guinean female athlete

Salitia Pipit MBE (born 1951) is a former Papua New Guinean athlete who competed in a wide range of running events and won multiple gold medals at the South Pacific Games.

== Early life ==
Salitia Pipit Muga was born on 6 June 1951 in Rabaul in East New Britain Province in Papua New Guinea (PNG). Her family came from the village of Ratavul, to the south-east of Rabaul. After primary school she went to high school near Rabaul as a boarder, where she discovered her athletic talent and began to take part in weekly competitions in Rabaul.

== Athletic career ==
Invited to the national championships in PNG's capital Port Moresby in 1969, she was selected to represent the then Territory of Papua and New Guinea in the South Pacific Games, which were being held in Port Moresby that year. She won a gold medal in the 800 metres and a bronze in the 400 metres. In 1971 at the South Pacific Games in Papeete, French Polynesia, she was the outstanding athlete, winning gold medals in the 200 metres, 400 metres and 800 metres, and a silver in the 100 metres, recording the same time as the winner, Keta Iongi from Tonga. She won a bronze medal in the 4×100 metres relay, with one of her team being Meg Taylor, who went on to be head of the Pacific Islands Forum from 2014 to 2021.

In the 1970s Pipit was semi-retired, after starting a family. She continued to compete in national competitions, however. In 1981 she took part in the Pacific Mini Games in Honiara, Solomon Islands and won four gold medals in the 400 metres, 800 metres and 4×400 metres relay. She then represented PNG in the 1982 Commonwealth Games in Brisbane, becoming, with Elanga Buala, the first women to represent PNG at the Commonwealth Games. Over a period of twelve years, from 1970 to 1982, Pipit set national records in an amazing range of running events, from the 100 metres to the marathon, as well as the 100 metres hurdles.

== Awards and honours ==
- 1971. PNG's Sportswoman of the Year.
- 1983. Member of the Order of the British Empire in the 1983 New Year Honours, for her services to sport.
- 2016. The first female athlete to be inducted into the PNG Sports Hall of Fame.

== Personal life ==
Pipit's children have been similarly athletic. Her daughter, Irene, represented PNG in the 1991 South Pacific Games in Port Moresby in the discus throw. Her second daughter, Helen, represented the country in the three sprint events and relays in the 1999 South Pacific Games in Guam. Her son, Meli, was a rugby union player.
