= North Texas Mean Green track and field =

College track and field team

- University: University of North Texas
- Head coach: Doug Marshall
- Conference: The American
- Location: Denton, Texas
- Outdoor track: Norma Knobel Hunt Stadium
- Nickname: Mean Green
- Colors: Green and white

The North Texas Mean Green track and field team is the track and field program that represents University of North Texas. The Mean Green compete in NCAA Division I as a member of the American Conference. The team is based in Denton, Texas at Norma Knobel Hunt Stadium.

The program is coached by Doug Marshall. The track and field program officially encompasses four teams, as the NCAA regards men's and women's indoor track and field and outdoor track and field as separate sports.

In 1972, Bill Schmidt qualified for the Munich Olympics in the javelin throw. He won the bronze medal, ending a U.S. drought in the event and becoming the first Mean Green track and field medallist.

== Postseason ==
=== AIAW ===
The Mean Green have had 11 AIAW All-Americans finishing in the top six at the AIAW outdoor or indoor championships.

AIAW All-Americans
Championships	Name	Event	Place
1969 Outdoor	Nancy Carlson	100 yards	6th
1969 Outdoor	Susan North	Javelin throw	6th
1969 Outdoor	Nancy Carlson	Long jump	6th
1973 Outdoor	Sherry Session	880 yards	6th
1980 Indoor	Ileana Hocking	1000 meters	2nd
1980 Indoor	Debra Pinnix	4 × 440 yards relay	5th
1980 Indoor	Joan Bennett	4 × 440 yards relay	5th
1980 Indoor	Ileana Hocking	4 × 440 yards relay	5th
1980 Indoor	Julie Bergeron	4 × 440 yards relay	5th
1980 Outdoor	Debra Pinnix	200 meters	6th
1981 Indoor	Ileana Hocking	1000 meters	2nd
1981 Indoor	Donna Thomas	Long jump	3rd
1981 Outdoor	Donna Thomas	Long jump	1st
1982 Indoor	Donna Thomas	Long jump	1st
1982 Outdoor	Sharon McDonald	100 meters	4th
1982 Outdoor	Donna Thomas	Long jump	2nd
1982 Outdoor	Donna Thomas	Sprint medley relay	2nd
1982 Outdoor	Anita Whitley	Sprint medley relay	2nd
1982 Outdoor	Sharon McDonald	Sprint medley relay	2nd
1982 Outdoor	Ella Smith	Sprint medley relay	2nd

=== NCAA ===
As of 2024, a total of 7 men and 2 women have achieved All-American status at the men's outdoor, women's outdoor, men's indoor, or women's indoor national championships.

First Team NCAA All-Americans
Team	Championships	Name	Event	Place
Men's	1955 Outdoor	Paul Patterson	800 meters	6th
Men's	1957 Outdoor	Denny Andrews	Javelin throw	8th
Men's	1960 Outdoor	Dave Clark	Pole vault	2nd
Men's	1965 Outdoor	Doyle Magee	400 meters	8th
Men's	1970 Outdoor	Bill Schmidt	Javelin throw	2nd
Men's	1980 Outdoor	Rudy Levarity	200 meters	7th
Women's	1982 Outdoor	Donna Thomas	Long jump	5th
Women's	1983 Indoor	Donna Thomas	Long jump	4th
Women's	1983 Outdoor	Donna Thomas	Long jump	7th
Men's	2013 Outdoor	Steven White	400 meters hurdles	3rd
Women's	2013 Outdoor	Shahaf Bareni	High jump	7th

== See also ==
- Category:North Texas Mean Green men's track and field athletes (4)
- Category:North Texas Mean Green women's track and field athletes (1)
