= John Kokinai =

Papua New Guinean long-distance runner

Personal information
- Nationality: Papua New Guinean
- Born: 17 May 1951 Bauluaku, Papua New Guinea
- Died: 26 September 1992 (aged 41) Port Moresby, Papua New Guinea

Sport
- Sport: Long-distance running
- Events: 5000 m, 10,000 m, 3000 m steeplechase, marathon
Medal record
Men's athletics
Representing Papua New Guinea
Pacific Games
Gold medal – first place	1975 Guam	5000 m
Gold medal – first place	1975 Guam	10,000 m
Gold medal – first place	1975 Guam	3000 m steeplechase
Silver medal – second place	1971 Papeete	3000 m steeplechase
Silver medal – second place	1975 Guam	Marathon
Bronze medal – third place	1971 Papeete	5000 m

John Kokinai (17 May 1951 – 26 September 1992) was a Papua New Guinean long-distance runner. Growing up in Bauluaku, he started competing in cross-country races on the island. Over a course of five years, he had won six national championship titles in various long-distance races. He made his international debut at the 1971 South Pacific Games, earning two medals. At the subsequent games in 1975, he won three gold medals with a gap between second place, and one bronze medal.

Kokinai was then invited to compete for Papua New Guinea at the 1976 Summer Olympics, which would be the first ever Papua New Guinean Olympic team. He competed in the men's marathon and 5000 metres though did not medal in the events. After his career, he studied outside of Bougainville and never returned to the island. He was later inducted to the Papua New Guinea Sports Hall of Fame. He died in Port Moresby on 26 September 1992.

== Biography ==
John Kokinai was born on 17 May 1951 in Bauluaku in Buin, Bougainville, Papua New Guinea. He started training in long-distance running in Bougainville and began to compete in cross-country races.

Domestically, he had won in the men's 3000 metre steeplechase and 10,000 metres at a 1971 competition in Port Moresby. He ran in times of 9:25.8 and 31:34.1, respectively, both setting national records. He had also won the gold in the men's 3000 metre steeplechase at the 1972 National Athletics Championships. He then made his international debut for Papua New Guinea at the 1971 South Pacific Games in Papeete in Tahiti. His main rival was Usaia Sotutu of Fiji. Kokinai had won a silver medal in the men's 3000 metre steeplechase with a time of 9:31.2 and a bronze medal in the 5000 metres with a time of 15:34.8, both placing behind Sotutu.

He studied at Chanel College in East New Britain Province and remained active in the sport, doing rigorous practice sessions. During this time, he had won the gold medals in the 1500 metres and 5000 metres at the 1972 National Athletics Championships in Rabaul. He had set two more national records in the process with times of 4:02.3 and 14:43.4. Prior to the 1975 South Pacific Games in Guam, he again won two more national titles, doing so in the 10,000 metres and 3000 metre steeplechase.

At the 1975 South Pacific Games, he won gold in the 5000 metres with a time of 15:01.02, the 10,000 metres with a time of 32:01.25, and the 3000 metre steeplechase in a time of 9:29.4, all with significant margins from the second placer. He also won a silver in the marathon with a time of 2:37:24, placing behind Alain Lazare. In his last national championships, he placed first in the 1500 metres, 5000 metres, and 10,000 metres.

He was invited to be part of the first Papua New Guinean team to compete at an Olympic Games, doing so at the 1976 Summer Olympics in Montreal, Canada. He had competed in the heats of the men's 5000 metres and ran in a time of 14:58.33, not advancing to the finals. A few days later, he competed in the men's marathon. He had run in a time of 2:41:49 and placed 59th out of the 60 people that finished the race.

Kokinai studied outside of Bougainville and never returned to the island. He resided in Port Moresby until his death on 26 September 1992 at the age of 41. Due to his service in sport, he was inducted to the Papua New Guinea Sports Hall of Fame. His 3000 metre steeplechase national record remained unbroken until 2024.
