= 1969 European Indoor Games – Men's shot put =

The men's shot put event at the 1969 European Indoor Games was held on 8 March in Belgrade.

== Results ==
Rank	Name	Nationality	Result	Notes
1st place, gold medalist(s)	Heinfried Birlenbach	West Germany	19.51	
2nd place, silver medalist(s)	Hartmut Briesenick	East Germany	19.19	
3rd place, bronze medalist(s)	Heinz-Joachim Rothenburg	East Germany	18.69	
4	Traugott Glöckler	West Germany	18.20	
5	Arnjolt Beer	France	18.18	
6	Sándor Holub	Hungary	17.73	
7	Miroslav Janoušek	Czechoslovakia	17.65	
8	Ivan Ivančić	Yugoslavia	17.53	
9	Tahsin Albayrak	Turkey	14.90	
