= Sanitesi Latu =

Tongan athlete

Personal information
- Born: 22 December 1950 Toloa, Tongatapu

Sport
- Country: Tonga
- Sport: Athletics
Medal record
Men's Athletics
Representing Tonga
Pacific Games
Bronze medal – third place	1987 Nouméa	Shot put
Gold medal – first place	1975 Tumon	110m hurdles
Gold medal – first place	1975 Tumon	Decathlon
Bronze medal – third place	1971 Papeete	Decathlon
Pacific Mini Games
Bronze medal – third place	1989 Nukuʻalofa	Shot put
Gold medal – first place	1985 Rarotonga	Shot put
Bronze medal – third place	1985 Rarotonga	Discus

Sanitesi Latu (born 22 December 1950) is a former Tongan Athlete who has represented Tonga at the Commonwealth Games, Pacific Games, and Pacific Mini Games.

Latu was born in Toloa on the island on Tongatapu.

He competed in the 1969 South Pacific Games in Port Moresby as a high jumper, without success. At the 1971 South Pacific Games in Papeete he won bronze in the Decathlon. He then competed in the 1974 British Commonwealth Games in Christchurch, New Zealand, coming 5th in the decathlon. After the Commonwealth Games he moved to Melbourne, Australia, where he worked as a storeman and gained permanent residency. He contested the 1975 South Pacific Games in Tumon, Guam, winning gold in both the 110 metres hurdles and the Decathlon. In 1974 and 1978 he was Australian champion in the decathlon. His Australian residency meant he was unable to compete in the 1979 South Pacific Games.

At the 1982 Commonwealth Games he retired from the decathlon. At the 1985 South Pacific Mini Games in Rarotonga he won gold in the shot put and bronze in the discus. At the 1987 South Pacific Games in Nouméa he won bronze in the shot put. At the 1989 South Pacific Mini Games in Nukuʻalofa he won bronze in the shot put.

In December 2009 he was inducted into the Tonga National Sports Hall of Fame.

== Honours ==
National honours

- Order of Queen Sālote Tupou III, Member (31 July 2008).
