= 1985 South Pacific Mini Games =

1985 Pacific Mini Games
- Host city: Rarotonga
- Country: Cook Islands
- Nations: 16
- Athletes: ~700
- Events: 6 sports
- Opening: 31 July 1985
- Closing: 9 August 1985

The 1985 South Pacific Mini Games were held at Rarotonga in the Cook Islands from 31 July to 9 August 1985. It was the second edition of the South Pacific Mini Games.

The new stadium built for the games had a grass track but several South Pacific Games athletics records were broken at the 1985 games including the women's 800 metres. The track and field competition also served as a selection trial for the Oceania team to compete at the IAAF World Cup in Canberra.

== Participating countries ==
Sixteen Pacific nations participated in the Games:

- American Samoa
- Cook Islands
- Fiji
- French Polynesia, "Tahiti"
- Kiribati
- Marshall Islands
- Nauru
- New Caledonia
- Niue
- Norfolk Island
- Papua New Guinea
- Solomon Islands
- Tonga
- Vanuatu
- Wallis and Futuna
- Western Samoa

== Sports ==
Six sports were contested at the 1985 South Pacific Mini Games:

- Athletics (40)
- Bowls
- Golf (4)
- Netball (1)
- Rugby union (1)
- Tennis (5)

== Final medal table ==
Papua New Guinea topped the medal count:

Rank	Nation	Gold	Silver	Bronze	Total
1	Papua New Guinea (PNG)	13	12	12	37
2	New Caledonia (NCL)	12	12	5	29
3	French Polynesia (PYF)	9	7	11	27
4	Cook Islands (COK)	6	6	8	20
4	Fiji (FIJ)	6	6	8	20
6	Samoa (SAM)	2	4	3	9
7	Wallis and Futuna (WLF)	2	1	3	6
8	American Samoa (ASA)	2	1	1	4
9	Vanuatu (VAN)	1	4	2	7
10	Norfolk Island (NFK)	1	2	1	4
11	Solomon Islands (SOL)	1	1	1	3
12	Tonga (TON)	1	0	2	3
13	Kiribati (KIR)	0	0	0	0
13	Marshall Islands (MHL)	0	0	0	0
13	Nauru (NRU)	0	0	0	0
13	Niue (NIU)	0	0	0	0
Totals (16 entries)		56	56	57	169

== See also ==
- Athletics at the 1985 South Pacific Mini Games

== Sources ==
- 2nd Mini South Pacific Games: Raratonga 31st July ~ 9th August 1985 (PDF) (Report). Cook Islands Sports and National Olympic Committee. 1985. Archived from the original (PDF) on 23 April 2017.
