= 1969 DGWS Outdoor Track and Field Championships =

Athletics championship event in Texas

- Dates: May 8–9, 1969
- Host city: San Marcos, Texas
- Venue: Southwest Texas State College
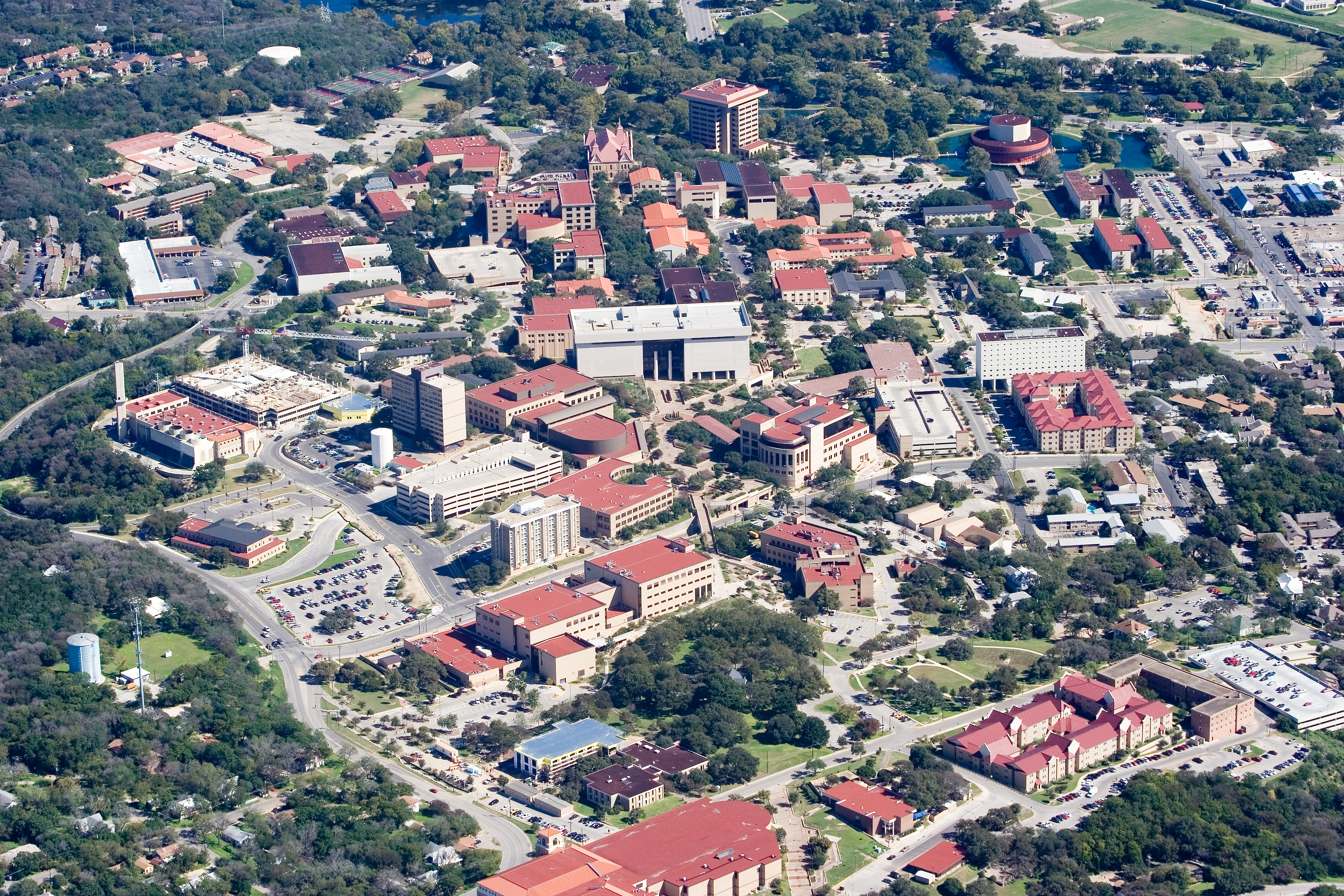

The 1969 DGWS Outdoor Track And Field Championships were the first Division for Girls' and Women's Sports-sanctioned track meet to determine the individual and team national champions of women's collegiate track and field events in the United States. They were contested May 8−9, 1969 in San Marcos, Texas at Southwest Texas State College and won by the Texas Woman's Pioneers track and field team.

There were not separate Division I, II, and III championships for outdoor track and field until 1981. The meet would be called the DGWS Championships until 1972, when the DGWS changed its name to the Association for Intercollegiate Athletics for Women (AIAW).

The meeting was criticized for failing to advertise to interested teams, as only 15 schools participated and no schools from California were included. Additionally, a controversial rule was implemented that excluded 'club' athletes although exceptions were made.

== Team standings ==
- Scoring: 10 points for a 1st-place finish, 8 points for 2nd, 6 points for 3rd, 4 points for 4th, 2 points for 5th, and 1 point for 6th. Top 10 teams shown.

| Rank | Team | Points |
|---|---|---|
| 1st place, gold medalist(s) | Texas Woman's Pioneers | 74 |
| 2nd place, silver medalist(s) | Texas Tech Red Raiders | 61 |
| 2nd place, silver medalist(s) | Indiana State Sycamores | 61 |
| 4th | Montclair State Red Hawks | 60 |
| 5th | Oklahoma State Cowgirls | 34 |
| 6th | Illinois Fighting Illini | 28 |
| 7th | Flathead Valley Mountainettes | 25 |
| 8th | Parkland Cobras | 22 |
| 9th | Tennessee Volunteers | 20 |
| 10th | Texas State Bobcats | 18 |

== Results ==
- Only results of finals are shown, six athletes per final

100 yards
| Pl. | Name | Team | Mark |
|---|---|---|---|
| 1st place, gold medalist(s) | Helen Jones | Texas Tech Red Raiders | 11.7 |
| 2nd place, silver medalist(s) | Kathy Vogler | Indiana State Sycamores | 11.9 |
| 3rd place, bronze medalist(s) | Kathy Wheat | Texas Tech Red Raiders | 12.0 |
| 4th | Marian Smolka | Texas Woman's Pioneers | 12.3 |
| 5th | Kathy Hannaford | Texas Woman's Pioneers | 12.4 |
| 6th | Nancy Carlson | North Texas Mean Green | 12.7 |

220 yards
| Pl. | Name | Team | Mark |
|---|---|---|---|
| 1st place, gold medalist(s) | Terry Hull | Tennessee Volunteers | 25.4 |
| 2nd place, silver medalist(s) | Kathy Rogers | McPherson Bulldogs | 26.9 |
| 3rd place, bronze medalist(s) | Kathy Vogler | Indiana State Sycamores | 27.2 |
| 4th | Paulette Burrhus | Texas Woman's Pioneers | 28.5 |
| 5th | Ann Burrell | Texas Tech Red Raiders | 28.9 |
| 6th | Cindy Woodrow | Texas Woman's Pioneers | 29.2 |

440 yards
| Pl. | Name | Team | Mark |
|---|---|---|---|
| 1st place, gold medalist(s) | Terry Hull | Tennessee Volunteers | 56.4 |
| 2nd place, silver medalist(s) | Debbie Smith | Texas Woman's Pioneers | 1:01.9 |
| 3rd place, bronze medalist(s) | Sylvia Longoria | Texas Woman's Pioneers | 1:03.8 |
| 4th | Kay Shelton | Texas Tech Red Raiders | 1:04.8 |
| 5th | Monica Bures | Texas State Bobcats | 1:06.1 |
| 6th | Karyl Wetz | Stephen F. Austin Ladyjacks | 1:10.0 |

880 yards
| Pl. | Name | Team | Mark |
|---|---|---|---|
| 1st place, gold medalist(s) | Cherrie Bridges | Indiana State Sycamores | 2:19.4 |
| 2nd place, silver medalist(s) | Debbie Smith | Texas Woman's Pioneers | 2:25.2 |
| 3rd place, bronze medalist(s) | Lyndell Wilken | Illinois Fighting Illini | 2:27.2 |
| 4th | Carleen Groves | Rice Owls | 2:28.6 |
| 5th | Sandy Nine | Oklahoma State Cowgirls | 2:31.4 |
| 6th | Jan Price | Texas Tech Red Raiders | 2:46.4 |

Mile run
| Pl. | Name | Team | Mark |
|---|---|---|---|
| 1st place, gold medalist(s) | Cherrie Bridges | Indiana State Sycamores | 5:15.1 |
| 2nd place, silver medalist(s) | Kathy Rogers | McPherson Bulldogs | 5:34.1 |
| 3rd place, bronze medalist(s) | Lyndell Wilken | Illinois Fighting Illini | 6:01.4 |
| 4th | Carleen Groves | Rice Owls | 6:19.3 |
| 5th | Jan Price | Texas Tech Red Raiders | 6:21.0 |
| 6th | Carol Downer | Texas Woman's Pioneers | 6:27.2 |

100 m hurdles
| Pl. | Name | Team | Mark |
|---|---|---|---|
| 1st place, gold medalist(s) | Lou Green | Montclair State Red Hawks | 15.4 |
| 2nd place, silver medalist(s) | Judy Foreman | Texas Tech Red Raiders | 15.7 |
| 3rd place, bronze medalist(s) | Connie Peterson | Illinois Fighting Illini | 16.2 |
| 4th | Avis Latham | Florida State Seminoles | 17.0 |
| 5th | Carolyn Turner | Texas Woman's Pioneers | 17.1 |
| 6th | Grace Willey | Flathead Valley Mountainettes | 17.2 |

200 m hurdles
| Pl. | Name | Team | Mark |
|---|---|---|---|
| 1st place, gold medalist(s) | Lou Green | Montclair State Red Hawks | 31.5 |
| 2nd place, silver medalist(s) | Grace Willey | Flathead Valley Mountainettes | 31.6 |
| 3rd place, bronze medalist(s) | Jane Carlile | Oklahoma State Cowgirls | 32.7 |
| 4th | Carolyn Turner | Texas Woman's Pioneers | 32.9 |
| 5th | Marti Johnson | Oklahoma State Cowgirls | 36.0 |
| | | Texas Woman's Pioneers | DNF (Note: A hurdler from Texas Woman's University was injured and did not finish.) |

4 × 110 yards relay
| Pl. | Name | Team | Mark |
|---|---|---|---|
| 1st place, gold medalist(s) | Helen Jones | Texas Tech Red Raiders | 51.7 |
| 1st place, gold medalist(s) | Ann Burrell | Texas Tech Red Raiders | 51.7 |
| 1st place, gold medalist(s) | Judy Foreman | Texas Tech Red Raiders | 51.7 |
| 1st place, gold medalist(s) | Kathy Wheat | Texas Tech Red Raiders | 51.7 |
| 2nd place, silver medalist(s) | Kathy Hannaford | Texas Woman's Pioneers | 53.1 |
| 2nd place, silver medalist(s) | Sylvia Longoria | Texas Woman's Pioneers | 53.1 |
| 2nd place, silver medalist(s) | Estep | Texas Woman's Pioneers | 53.1 |
| 2nd place, silver medalist(s) | Cindy Woodrow | Texas Woman's Pioneers | 53.1 |
| 3rd place, bronze medalist(s) | Karen Buckner | Texas State Bobcats 'B' | 53.7 |
| 3rd place, bronze medalist(s) | Brannan | Texas State Bobcats 'B' | 53.7 |
| 3rd place, bronze medalist(s) | Smith | Texas State Bobcats 'B' | 53.7 |
| 3rd place, bronze medalist(s) | Heuvel | Texas State Bobcats 'B' | 53.7 |
| 4th | Tillison | Stephen F. Austin Ladyjacks | 54.2 |
| 4th | Walker | Stephen F. Austin Ladyjacks | 54.2 |
| 4th | Fenske | Stephen F. Austin Ladyjacks | 54.2 |
| 4th | Irwin | Stephen F. Austin Ladyjacks | 54.2 |
| 5th | Beavers | Texas State Bobcats 'A' | 54.6 |
| 5th | Riding | Texas State Bobcats 'A' | 54.6 |
| 5th | DuVall | Texas State Bobcats 'A' | 54.6 |
| 5th | Blake | Texas State Bobcats 'A' | 54.6 |
| 6th | Atherton | Oklahoma State Cowgirls | 54.9 |
| 6th | Thompson | Oklahoma State Cowgirls | 54.9 |
| 6th | Taylor | Oklahoma State Cowgirls | 54.9 |
| 6th | Jane Carlile | Oklahoma State Cowgirls | 54.9 |

Sprint medley relay (Note: Held at a total distance of 880 yards, with the first leg running 220 yards, the middle two legs running 110 yards, and the anchor leg running 440 yards.)
| Pl. | Name | Team | Mark |
|---|---|---|---|
| 1st place, gold medalist(s) | Kathy Vogler | Indiana State Sycamores | 1:56.9 |
| 1st place, gold medalist(s) | Pat Shipley | Indiana State Sycamores | 1:56.9 |
| 1st place, gold medalist(s) | Cheryle Hinton | Indiana State Sycamores | 1:56.9 |
| 1st place, gold medalist(s) | Cherrie Bridges | Indiana State Sycamores | 1:56.9 |
| 2nd place, silver medalist(s) | Marian Smolka | Texas Woman's Pioneers 'A' | 1:57.3 |
| 2nd place, silver medalist(s) | Sylvia Longoria | Texas Woman's Pioneers 'A' | 1:57.3 |
| 2nd place, silver medalist(s) | Debbie Smith | Texas Woman's Pioneers 'A' | 1:57.3 |
| 2nd place, silver medalist(s) | Kathy Hannaford | Texas Woman's Pioneers 'A' | 1:57.3 |
| 3rd place, bronze medalist(s) | Helen Jones | Texas Tech Red Raiders | 1:57.8 |
| 3rd place, bronze medalist(s) | Ann Burrell | Texas Tech Red Raiders | 1:57.8 |
| 3rd place, bronze medalist(s) | Kathy Wheat | Texas Tech Red Raiders | 1:57.8 |
| 3rd place, bronze medalist(s) | Kay Shelton | Texas Tech Red Raiders | 1:57.8 |
| 4th | Estep | Texas Woman's Pioneers 'B' | 2:01.4 |
| 4th | Beyer | Texas Woman's Pioneers 'B' | 2:01.4 |
| 4th | Cindy Woodrow | Texas Woman's Pioneers 'B' | 2:01.4 |
| 4th | Paulette Burrhus | Texas Woman's Pioneers 'B' | 2:01.4 |
| 5th | Atherton | Oklahoma State Cowgirls | 2:04.8 |
| 5th | Taylor | Oklahoma State Cowgirls | 2:04.8 |
| 5th | Thompson | Oklahoma State Cowgirls | 2:04.8 |
| 5th | Sandy Nine | Oklahoma State Cowgirls | 2:04.8 |
| 6th | Monica Bures | Texas State Bobcats | 2:05.2 |
| 6th | DuVall | Texas State Bobcats | 2:05.2 |
| 6th | Riding | Texas State Bobcats | 2:05.2 |
| 6th | Smith | Texas State Bobcats | 2:05.2 |

Shot put
| Pl. | Name | Team | Mark |
|---|---|---|---|
| 1st place, gold medalist(s) | Denise Wood | Montclair State Red Hawks | 43 ft 7 in (13.28 m) |
| 2nd place, silver medalist(s) | Lee Ann Wojtkowski | Florida State Seminoles | 42 ft 4 in (12.9 m) |
| 3rd place, bronze medalist(s) | Lynda Spaulding | Flathead Valley Mountainettes | 39 ft 11 3/4 in (12.18 m) |
| 4th | Liz Sharp | Parkland Cobras | 36 ft 6 1/4 in (11.13 m) |
| 5th | Margaret Kane | Florida State Seminoles | 36 ft 4 1/4 in (11.08 m) |
| 6th | Cheryle Hinton | Indiana State Sycamores | 34 ft 8 1/4 in (10.57 m) |

Discus throw
| Pl. | Name | Team | Mark |
|---|---|---|---|
| 1st place, gold medalist(s) | Denise Wood | Montclair State Red Hawks | 134 ft 11 1/2 in (41.13 m) |
| 2nd place, silver medalist(s) | Liz Sharp | Parkland Cobras | 129 ft 11 in (39.59 m) |
| 3rd place, bronze medalist(s) | Lynda Spaulding | Flathead Valley Mountainettes | 113 ft 4 in (34.54 m) |
| 4th | Gerry Pinkston | Oklahoma State Cowgirls | 113 ft 2 in (34.49 m) |
| 5th | Beverly Averyt | Stephen F. Austin Ladyjacks | 108 ft 2 in (32.96 m) |
| 6th | Barbara Gardner | Texas Woman's Pioneers | 105 ft 11 1/2 in (32.29 m) |

Javelin throw
| Pl. | Name | Team | Mark |
|---|---|---|---|
| 1st place, gold medalist(s) | Denise Wood | Montclair State Red Hawks | 127 ft 8 in (38.91 m) |
| 2nd place, silver medalist(s) | Mary K. Hyde | Oklahoma State Cowgirls | 125 ft 2 in (38.15 m) |
| 3rd place, bronze medalist(s) | Cindi Hartman | Oklahoma State Cowgirls | 113 ft 0 1/2 in (34.45 m) |
| 4th | Lynda Spaulding | Flathead Valley Mountainettes | 109 ft 6 in (33.37 m) |
| 5th | Connie Peterson | Illinois Fighting Illini | 109 ft 2 in (33.27 m) |
| 6th | Susan North | North Texas Mean Green | 108 ft 1 in (32.94 m) |

High jump
| Pl. | Name | Team | Mark |
|---|---|---|---|
| 1st place, gold medalist(s) | Liz Sharp | Parkland Cobras | 5 ft 2 in (1.57 m) |
| 2nd place, silver medalist(s) | Connie Peterson | Illinois Fighting Illini | 5 ft 1 in (1.54 m) |
| 3rd place, bronze medalist(s) | Pat Shipley | Indiana State Sycamores | 5 ft 0 in (1.52 m) |
| 4th | Phyllis Hobart | Texas Tech Red Raiders | 4 ft 11 in (1.49 m) |
| 5th | Karen Buckner | Texas State Bobcats | 4 ft 8 in (1.42 m) |
| 6th | Teresa Burrhus | Texas Woman's Pioneers | 4 ft 6 in (1.37 m) |

Long jump
| Pl. | Name | Team | Mark |
|---|---|---|---|
| 1st place, gold medalist(s) | Frances Greene | Montclair State Red Hawks | 17 ft 1 in (5.2 m) |
| 2nd place, silver medalist(s) | Pat Shipley | Indiana State Sycamores | 17 ft 0 1/2 in (5.19 m) |
| 3rd place, bronze medalist(s) | Marian Smolka | Texas Woman's Pioneers | 16 ft 2 in (4.92 m) |
| 4th | Judy Foreman | Texas Tech Red Raiders | 15 ft 10 1/2 in (4.83 m) |
| 5th | Julia Sowell | Stephen F. Austin Ladyjacks | 15 ft 7 1/2 in (4.76 m) |
| 6th | Nancy Carlson | North Texas Mean Green | 15 ft 7 in (4.74 m) |

== See also ==
- Association for Intercollegiate Athletics for Women championships § Outdoor track and field
- 1969 NCAA Division I Outdoor Track and Field Championships
