= André Claude =

Canadian javelin thrower

Personal information
- Born: 18 August 1949 (age 76) Lachine, Quebec, Canada

Sport
- Sport: Athletics
- Event: Javelin throw

André Claude (born 18 August 1949) is a Canadian athlete. He competed in the men's javelin throw at the 1972 Summer Olympics.
