= Cheryl Bridges =

American long-distance runner

- Born: December 25, 1947 (age 78); Indiana, U.S.
- Education: Indiana State University
- Occupation: American long-distance runner

Cheryl Bridges, now Cheryl Treworgy, is an American former long-distance runner who once held the American and world record in the marathon, racing in the 1960s and 1970s. She was the first women runner to be on the cover of a running magazine.

== Biography ==
Cheryl Bridges, née Pedlow, was born December 25, 1947, in Indiana. She began her running career as a sophomore at North Central High School in Indianapolis. In her senior year in high school, she competed in the national cross-country championships.

In 1966, she became the first female athlete in the U.S. to receive an athletic scholarship to a public university, Indiana State University, who did not have a women's program when Bridges enrolled. Bridges won the 880 yards and mile run at the inaugural 1969 DGWS Outdoor Track and Field Championships. She graduated in three years with a degree in physical education.

In 1969, she finished fourth in the World Cross Country Championships in Scotland. She set the U.S. records in the 3 mile and 5,000 meter distances, after which she was coached by Bill Dellinger. In 1971, she finished 3rd in the U.S. cross country championship.

On December 7, 1971, Bridges ran her first marathon, finishing the Culver City Marathon in a then-world record time of 2:49:40, becoming the first woman to break 2:50:00 in the marathon.

She was inducted into the Indiana Track and Cross Country Hall of Fame in 1983, the Indiana State University Athletic Hall of Fame in 1984 and the Road Runners Club of America Hall of Fame in 1987.

She is the mother of Shalane Flanagan.

Records
Preceded by (United States) Elizabeth Bonner	Women's Marathon World Record Holder; December 5, 1971 – December 2, 1973	Succeeded by (United States) Michiko Gorman
