= Fred Luke =

American javelin thrower

Personal information
- Born: November 12, 1946 (age 79) Bellingham, Washington, United States

Sport
- Sport: Athletics
- Event: Javelin throw

Fred Luke (born November 12, 1946) is an American athlete. He competed in the men's javelin throw at the 1972 Summer Olympics.

Luke was an All-American thrower for the Washington Huskies track and field team, finishing 6th in the javelin at the 1967 NCAA University Division outdoor track and field championships.
