= List of ambassadors of Papua New Guinea to the United States =

Coordinates: 38.908856°N 77.041228°W

Ambassador of Papua New Guinea to the United States Embassy of Papua New Guinea in Washington, D.C.
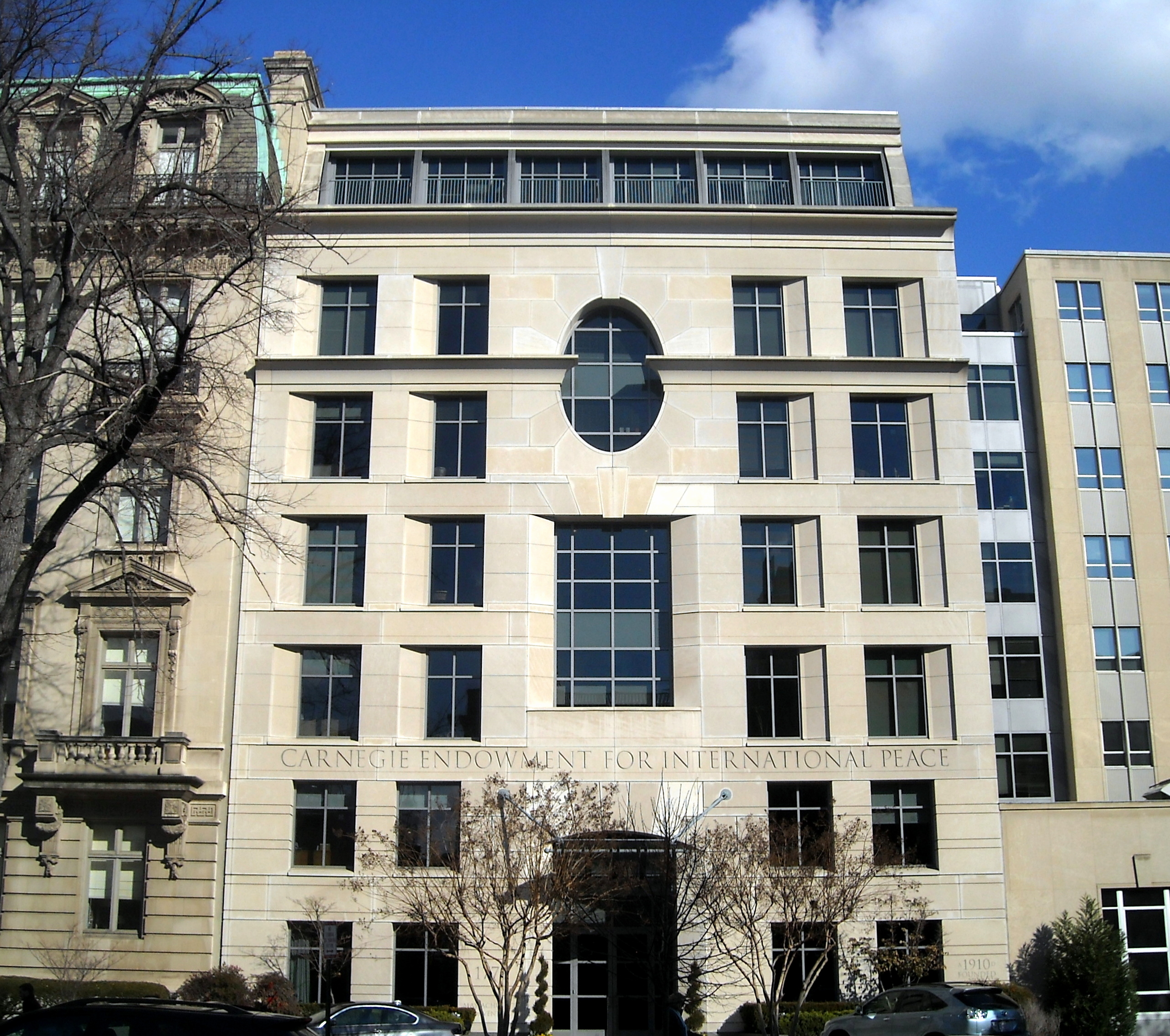
- Inaugural holder: Paulias Matane
- Formation: September 16, 1975

The Papua New Guinean ambassador in Washington, D. C. is the official representative of the Government in Port Moresby to the Government of the United States.

== List of representatives ==
Diplomatic agrément	Diplomatic accreditation	Ambassador	Observations	Prime Minister of Papua New Guinea	List of presidents of the United States	Term end
September 16, 1975	September 16, 1975	Paulias Matane	Chargé d'affaires, opened the embassy	Michael Somare	Gerald Ford	
January 9, 1976	January 23, 1976	Paulias Matane		Michael Somare	Gerald Ford	
December 8, 1980	December 11, 1980	Kubulan Los		Julius Chan	Jimmy Carter	
August 15, 1983		John Bllagetuna	Chargé d'affaires	Michael Somare	Ronald Reagan	
March 23, 1984	April 13, 1984	Renagi Renagi Lohia		Michael Somare	Ronald Reagan	
May 28, 1986	June 23, 1986	Kiatro Ottao Abisinito		Paias Wingti	Ronald Reagan	
September 29, 1987	October 20, 1987	Renagi Renagi Lohia		Paias Wingti	Ronald Reagan	
May 19, 1989	August 3, 1989	Meg Taylor	Margaret Taylor	Rabbie Namaliu	George H. W. Bush	
June 23, 1994		Kepas Ismael Watangia		Julius Chan	Bill Clinton	
February 7, 1996	April 30, 1996	Nagora Bogan		Julius Chan	Bill Clinton	
August 12, 2003	September 8, 2003	Evan Jeremy Paki		Michael Somare	George W. Bush	2011
January 7, 2014	March 10, 2014	Rupa Abraham Mulina		Peter O'Neill	Barack Obama	May 29, 2019
