= Jim Taylor (explorer) =

James Lindsay Taylor (25 January 1901 – 28 June 1987) was an Australian born, Papua New Guinean explorer. He is most noted for leading patrols (explorations) into the Highlands of Papua New Guinea in the 1930s. In particular the 1933 patrol in the Wahgi Valley with the brothers Dan and Mick Leahy and surveyor Ken Spinks; and for the Hagen-Sepik patrol with John Black in 1938–39.

Taylor enlisted in the Australian Imperial Force in March 1917 aged 16 and served with the 34th Battalion in France where he was gassed and wounded. He also served in the Second World War in the Australian New Guinea Administrative Unit (ANGAU) reaching the rank of Major.

Following the war Taylor married and settled at Goroka in the highlands.

Jim Taylor had two daughters and an adopted son. His daughter Meg Taylor was Ambassador of Papua New Guinea to the United States, Mexico and Canada in Washington DC during 1989–1994, and in 2014 was appointed Secretary General of the Pacific Islands Forum. He was a nephew of Desmond Carter the British lyricist.
