= Athletics at the 1975 Summer Universiade – Men's javelin throw =

The men's javelin throw event at the 1975 Summer Universiade was held at the Stadio Olimpico in Rome on 19 September.

== Results ==
Rank	Athlete	Nationality	Result	Notes
1st place, gold medalist(s)	Gheorghe Megelea	Romania	81.30	UR
2nd place, silver medalist(s)	Bill Schmidt	United States	80.20	
3rd place, bronze medalist(s)	Ivan Morgol	Soviet Union	78.44	
4	Reinhard Lange	West Germany	77.88	
5	Pekka Pappalainen	Finland	77.22	
6	Piotr Bielczyk	Poland	74.80	
7	Carol Raduly	Romania	74.78	
8	Renzo Cramerotti	Italy	71.30	
9	David Ottley	Great Britain	67.82	
10	Maamar Boubekeur	Algeria	64.02	
11	Shalal Ashour	Iraq	57.90	
12	Jürg Führer	Switzerland	55.42	
