= Abdul Atif Al-Qahtani =

Saudi Arabian Olympic javelin thrower (born 1946)

Personal information
- Nationality: Saudi Arabian
- Born: 1 July 1946 (age 79) Saudi Arabia
- Height: 172 cm (5 ft 8 in)
- Weight: 70 kg (154 lb)

Sport
- Country: Saudi Arabia
- Sport: Javelin throw

Abdul Atif Seif Al-Qahtani (Arabic: عبد عاطف سيف القحطاني; born 1 July 1946) is a Saudi Arabian Olympic javelin thrower. He represented his country in the men's javelin throw at the 1972 Summer Olympics.

In 1971, Al-Qahtani set his discus personal best by throwing 58.40 metres.

Al-Qahtani was placed in the 'A' discus qualification group at the 1972 Olympics. After fouls on his first two throws, he threw the disc 53.06 metres on his third and final attempt, finishing in 12th place in his group and not qualifying for the finals.
