= Klaus Wolfermann =

West German javelin thrower (1946–2024)

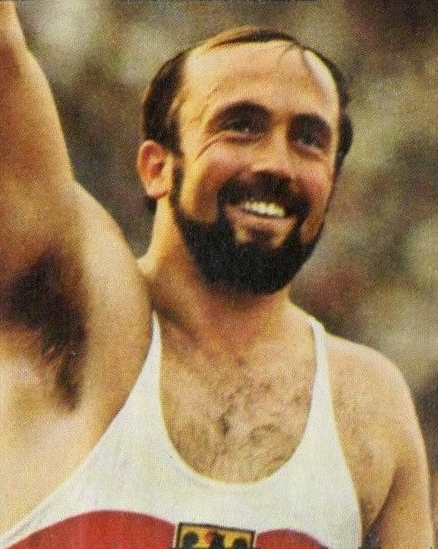
- Wolfermann c. 1974

Personal information
- Born: 31 March 1946 Altdorf bei Nürnberg, Bavaria, Germany
- Died: 18 December 2024 (aged 78)
- Height: 1.76 m (5 ft 9 in)
- Weight: 88 kg (194 lb)

Sport
- Country: West Germany
- Sport: Athletics
- Event: Javelin throw
- Club: Sportverein Gendorf

Achievements and titles
- Personal best: 94.08 m (1973)
Medal record
Men's athletics
Representing West Germany
Olympic Games
Gold medal – first place	1972 Munich	Javelin

Klaus Wolfermann (German pronunciation: [klaʊs ˈvɔlfɐman]; 31 March 1946 – 18 December 2024) was a German javelin thrower. He represented West Germany and won a gold medal at the 1972 Summer Olympics in Munich and set a world record in 1973.

The javelin competition at the 1972 Games was the closest in Olympic history. Wolfermann had taken the lead from Jānis Lūsis of the USSR in the fifth round with an Olympic Record throw of 90.48 meters. Then, in the sixth and final round, Lūsis let fly with a very long effort that measured at 90.46 meters – Wolfermann's two centimeter margin was, at the time, the smallest unit of measurement used in javelin competitions.

On 5 May 1973, Klaus Wolfermann set a new world record in the javelin throw, bettering Lūsis' previous record of 93.80 meters with a mark of 94.08 m. Wolfermann's record stood until 26 July 1976, when Hungary's Miklós Németh threw his javelin for 94.58 m at the 1976 Summer Olympics in Montreal, Quebec, Canada.

Wolfermann died on 18 December 2024, at the age of 78.

Awards
Preceded by (Germany) Hans Fassnacht	German Sportsman of the Year; 1972–1973	Succeeded by (Germany) Eberhard Gienger
