= Saimoni Tamani =

Fijian athletics competitor

Personal information
- Nationality: Fiji
- Born: November 14, 1944 (age 81) Bua, Fiji

Sport
- Sport: Athletics
- Event(s): 400 metres (qualified, injured)
- University team: Brigham Young University Cougars
- Team: Team Fiji
- Coached by: Clarence Robison
Medal record
Men's athletics
Representing Fiji
(South) Pacific Games
Gold medal – first place	1966 Nouméa	4x400 m relay
Gold medal – first place	1969 Port Moresby	400 m
Gold medal – first place	1969 Port Moresby	800 m
Gold medal – first place	1969 Port Moresby	4x400 m relay
Commonwealth Games
Bronze medal – third place	1970 Edinburgh	400 m
Olympic Games
- Updated on 22 September 2023

Saimoni Tamani (born 14 November 1944) is a Fijian former athlete who specialized in running the 400 metres (400-meter dash).

== College years ==
Tamani was a track star at Brigham Young University in Provo, Utah.

== Running/Sprinting career ==
Tamani won a gold medal in the 1966 South Pacific Games in Noumea. He won three gold medals at the 1969 South Pacific Games in Port Moresby. At the 1970 Commonwealth Games in Edinburgh, Tamani won the bronze medal in the 400 metres with a time of 45.82 seconds. It was Fiji's first medal in athletics at the Commonwealth Games since 1950. He was slated to compete at the 1972 Summer Olympics in Munich, West Germany, but suffered a foot injury during the NCAA indoor track season.

== Post running career ==
In 1973 he moved to the United States, where he worked at a paper mill in Longview, Washington, retiring after 30 years.

He was inducted into the Fiji Sports Hall of Fame in 1991.

== Personal life ==
Tamani is a member of the Church of Jesus Christ of Latter-day Saints.

== Achievements ==
Year	Competition	Venue	Position	Event	Notes
Representing Fiji
1966	South Pacific Games	Nouméa, New Caledonia	1st	4x400 m relay	3:24.08 min
1969	South Pacific Games	Port Moresby, Papua New Guinea	1st	400 m	48.8 s
1969	South Pacific Games	Port Moresby, Papua New Guinea	1st	800 m	1:57.3 min
1969	South Pacific Games	Port Moresby, Papua New Guinea	1st	4x400 m relay	3:19.6 min
1970	1970 Edinburgh	Edinburgh, Scotland	3rd	400 m	45.82 s
