= Lolesio Tuita =

French athletics competitor

Lolésio Tuita
Personal information
- Nationality: France
- Born: 15 July 1943 Hihifo, Uvea, Wallis and Futuna
- Died: 15 December 1994 (aged 51)
- Height: 1.82 m (6 ft 0 in)
- Weight: 90 kg (200 lb)

Sport
- Sport: Athletics
Medal record
Men's athletics
Representing Wallis and Futuna
(South) Pacific Games
Gold medal – first place	1975 Tumon	Javelin throw
Gold medal – first place	1971 Pirae	Javelin throw
Gold medal – first place	1969 Port Moresby	Javelin throw
Bronze medal – third place	1971 Pirae	Shot put
Bronze medal – third place	1969 Port Moresby	Shot put
- Updated on 26 April 2013

Lolésio Tuita (15 July 1943 – 15 December 1994) was a French javelin thrower who competed in the 1972 Summer Olympics.

== Achievements ==
Year	Competition	Venue	Position	Event	Notes
Representing Wallis and Futuna
1969	South Pacific Games	Port Moresby, Papua New Guinea	3rd	Shot put	13.85 m
1969	South Pacific Games	Port Moresby, Papua New Guinea	1st	Javelin throw	72.76 m
1971	South Pacific Games	Pirae, French Polynesia	3rd	Shot put	14.52 m
1971	South Pacific Games	Pirae, French Polynesia	1st	Javelin throw	71.10 m
1975	South Pacific Games	Tumon, Guam	1st	Javelin throw	73.20 m
