= Nancy Carlson =

American politician

Member of New Hampshire House of Representatives for Cheshire 6
- In office 2008–2010

Personal details
- Party: Republican

Nancy L. Carlson is an American politician. She represented Cheshire County on the New Hampshire House of Representatives from 2008 to 2010.
