= Bjørn Grimnes =

Norwegian javelin thrower

Bjørn Grimnes (born 24 September 1950) is a former javelin thrower from Norway. He represented Kongsberg IF.

At the 1972 Summer Olympics, he finished fifth in the javelin final with a throw of 83.08 metres. At the 1976 Summer Olympics, he finished fourteenth with 74.88 m. He became Norwegian champion in 1972, 1973 and 1978.

His personal best throw was 88.32 metres (old type), achieved in June 1978 in Helsinki.
