= Arnjolt Beer =

French shot putter

Personal information
- Nationality: France
- Born: 19 June 1946 (age 80) Koumac, North Province, New Caledonia
- Height: 1.88 m (6 ft 2 in)
- Weight: 120 kg (260 lb)

Sport
- Sport: Athletics
Medal record
Men's athletics
Representing New Caledonia
(South) Pacific Games
| Gold medal – first place | 1983 Apia | Shot put |
| Gold medal – first place | 1975 Tumon | Shot put |
| Gold medal – first place | 1975 Tumon | Discus throw |
| Gold medal – first place | 1971 Pirae | Shot put |
| Gold medal – first place | 1971 Pirae | Discus throw |
| Gold medal – first place | 1969 Port Moresby | Shot put |
| Gold medal – first place | 1969 Port Moresby | Discus throw |
| Gold medal – first place | 1966 Nouméa | Shot put |
| Silver medal – second place | 1983 Apia | Discus throw |
| Silver medal – second place | 1975 Tumon | Hammer throw |
| Silver medal – second place | 1966 Nouméa | Discus throw |
| Bronze medal – third place | 1971 Pirae | Hammer throw |
| Bronze medal – third place | 1969 Port Moresby | Hammer throw |
- Updated on 26 April 2013

Arnjolt Beer (born 19 June 1946) is a retired French shot putter.

He was born in Koumac in New Caledonia, and represented the club Stade Français. He represented France at the 1968 and 1972 Olympic Games, where he did not reach the final. He won the silver medal at the 1967 Mediterranean Games, finished sixth at the 1968 European Indoor Games, eighth at the 1970 European Indoor Championships, thirteenth at the 1971 European Indoor Championships, tenth at the 1972 European Indoor Championships, tenth at the 1976 European Indoor Championships, and twelfth at the 1981 European Indoor Championships.

He became French champion in 1968, 1971, 1978 and 1980, and French indoor champion in 1975, 1977, 1978 and 1979. At the South Pacific Games Beer won the shot put in 1966, 1969, 1971, 1975 and 1983. He set a championship record with 18.07 metres in 1971, and equalled it in 1975. It withstood later competitions. Also, in the discus throw he won gold medals in 1969, 1971 and 1975 and silver medals in 1966 and 1983. Here, too, he set a championship record of 50.22 metres in 1969, but it was erased by French Polynesian Jean-Claude Duhaze in 1979. In the hammer throw Beer won a silver medal in 1975 and bronze medals in 1969 and 1971.

== Achievements ==
| Year | Competition | Venue | Position | Event | Notes |
Representing New Caledonia
| 1966 | South Pacific Games | Nouméa, New Caledonia | 1st | Shot put | 15.82 m |
| 1966 | South Pacific Games | Nouméa, New Caledonia | 2nd | Discus throw | 44.68 m |
| 1969 | South Pacific Games | Port Moresby, Papua New Guinea | 1st | Shot put | 17.89 m |
| 1969 | South Pacific Games | Port Moresby, Papua New Guinea | 1st | Discus throw | 50.22 m |
| 1969 | South Pacific Games | Port Moresby, Papua New Guinea | 3rd | Hammer throw | 41.84 m |
| 1971 | South Pacific Games | Pirae, French Polynesia | 1st | Shot put | 18.07 m |
| 1971 | South Pacific Games | Pirae, French Polynesia | 1st | Discus throw | 49.98 m |
| 1971 | South Pacific Games | Pirae, French Polynesia | 3rd | Hammer throw | 44.00 m |
| 1975 | South Pacific Games | Tumon, Guam | 1st | Shot put | 18.07 m |
| 1975 | South Pacific Games | Tumon, Guam | 1st | Discus throw | 48.30 m |
| 1975 | South Pacific Games | Tumon, Guam | 2nd | Hammer throw | 43.66 m |
| 1983 | South Pacific Games | Apia, Western Samoa | 1st | Shot put | 16.97 m |
| 1983 | South Pacific Games | Apia, Western Samoa | 2nd | Discus throw | 48.70 m |
