= Leo Pusa =

Finnish athlete

Personal information
- Full name: Leo Pellervo Pusa
- Nationality: Finnish
- Born: 23 March 1947 (age 79) Sievi, Finland

Sport
- Sport: Athletics
- Event: Javelin throw
- Club: Esbo IF

Leo Pellervo Pusa (born 23 March 1947) is a Finnish athlete. He competed in the men's javelin throw at the 1972 Summer Olympics, but failed to register a result as he fouled all his three throws.

His personal best throw was 82.48 metres (old javelin type), achieved in 1972. He never became Finnish champion, with Hannu Siitonen taking all the national titles while Pusa was in his prime.
