= Milt Sonsky =

American javelin thrower (1941–2024)

Milton Barry Sonsky (July 2, 1941 – March 23, 2024) was an American javelin thrower who competed in the 1972 Summer Olympics.
