= Bill Schmidt =

American javelin thrower (1947–2026)

Personal information
- Full name: William David Schmidt
- Born: December 29, 1947 Muse, Pennsylvania, U.S.
- Died: August 31, 2026 (aged 78) Knoxville, Tennessee, U.S.
- Height: 6 ft 0 in (1.83 m)
- Weight: 220 lb (100 kg)
Medal record
Men's athletics
Representing United States
Olympic Games
Bronze medal – third place	1972 Munich	Javelin throw
Summer Universiade
Silver medal – second place	1975 Rome	Javelin throw

William David Schmidt (December 29, 1947 – August 31, 2026) was an American javelin thrower and sports marketer.

== Early life ==
Schmidt learned javelin throw as a high school sophomore. was a walk-on athlete at the North Texas college team, where he was runner-up at the 1970 NCAA University Division Outdoor Track and Field Championships. In 1970 he was drafted into the United States Army, where he was stationed in California and West Point.

== Career ==
He won the bronze medal at the javelin throw event during the 1972 Summer Olympics. He joined the University of Tennessee, where he earned a master’s degree in business education in 1976 while working as a teacher.

Schmidt was the sports director at the 1982 World's Fair in Knoxville. In 1984 he became a marketing executive at sports drink company Gatorade, but he was quickly hired by the 1984 Los Angeles Olympics committee to serve as vice president of sports. Back to Gatorade, he signed multiple sponsorship deals including the NBA Slam Dunk Contest, Home Run Derby, National Football League's Punt, Pass, and Kick program, Michael Jordan, and the National Athletic Trainers' Association.

In 1999 he left Gatorade to work at the sunglasses company Oakley. In 2001 he founded the marketing consulting company Pegasus.

Schmidt was inducted into the North Texas Athletics Hall of Fame in 1988, and the Greater Knoxville Sports Hall of Fame in 2014 He was also named in the Sports Business Journal's The Champions awards later that year.

== Personal life ==
Schmidt died on August 31, 2026, at the age of 78.
