= Meg Taylor =

Papua New Guinean politician

Dame Meg Taylor DBE
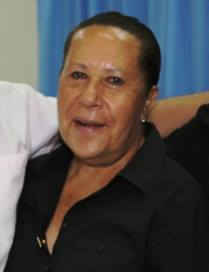
- Taylor in 2014

9th Secretary General of the Pacific Islands Forum
- In office 4 December 2014 – 24 May 2021
- Preceded by: Tuiloma Neroni Slade
- Succeeded by: Henry Puna

Ambassador to the United States, Mexico and Canada
- In office 1989–1994

Personal details
- Education: Melbourne University; Harvard University
- Occupation: Diplomat; Lawyer; Track and field athlete
- Sports career
Medal record
Women's athletics
Representing Papua New Guinea
(South) Pacific Games
Silver medal – second place	1971 Pirae	Pentathlon
Bronze medal – third place	1971 Pirae	4x100 m relay

Dame Meg Taylor DBE is a Papua New Guinean politician who served as Secretary General to the Pacific Islands Forum from 2014 to 2021. She was previously an athlete, lawyer and diplomat.

== Life and career ==
She received her LL.B degree from Melbourne University, Australia, and her LL.M degree from Harvard University in the United States. She practised law in Papua New Guinea and serves as a member of the Law Reform Commission.

The daughter of Australian explorer Jim Taylor, she was made a Dame Commander of the Order of the British Empire in 2002.

From 1989 to 1994, she was Ambassador of Papua New Guinea to the United States, Mexico and Canada in Washington D.C. Until 2014, Taylor was vice president, Compliance Advisor Ombudsman (CAO) for the International Finance Corporation (IFC) and the Multilateral Investment Guarantee Agency (MIGA) of the World Bank Group.

On 31 July 2014, it was announced that Dame Meg Taylor would take up the appointment of Secretary General to the Pacific Islands Forum, an intergovernmental organization that aims to enhance cooperation between the independent countries of the Pacific Ocean; she became the first woman to hold that post.

== Achievements in athletics ==
Year	Competition	Venue	Position	Event	Notes
Representing Papua New Guinea
1971	South Pacific Games	Pirae, French Polynesia	2nd	Pentathlon	3386 pts
1971	South Pacific Games	Pirae, French Polynesia	3rd	4 × 100 m relay	50.4 s

== See also ==
- List of first women lawyers and judges in Oceania
