= Günther Glassauer =

German javelin thrower

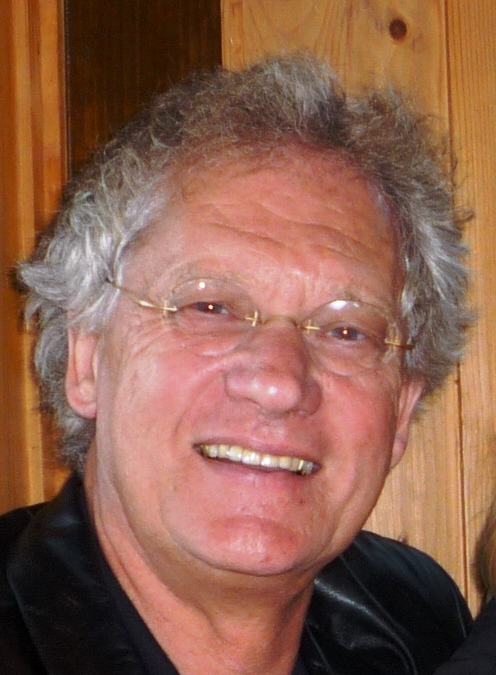

Personal information
- Nationality: German
- Born: 31 March 1948 (age 78) Wetzlar, West Germany

Sport
- Sport: Athletics
- Event: Javelin throw

Günther Glassauer (born 31 March 1948) is a German athlete. He competed in the men's javelin throw at the 1972 Summer Olympics.
