= Usaia Sotutu =

Fijian athlete

Personal information
- Full name: Usaia Naiteitei Sotutu
- Nationality: Fiji
- Born: 20 September 1947 (age 78) Tavea, Bua, Fiji
- Height: 1.66 m (5 ft 5 in)
- Weight: 63 kg (139 lb)

Sport
- Sport: Athletics
- Events: 5000 metres 10,000 metres 3000 metres steeplechase
- University team: Brigham Young University Cougars
- Team: Team Fiji
- Coached by: Clarence Robison

Achievements and titles
- Personal bests: 5000m – 15:11.8 (1969); 10000m – 31:32.0 (1971); 3000m Steepl – 8:48.0 (1971)
Medal record
Men's athletics
Representing Fiji
Olympic Games
(South) Pacific Games
Gold medal – first place	1975 Tumon	1500 m
Gold medal – first place	1971 Pirae	5000 m
Gold medal – first place	1971 Pirae	10,000 m
Gold medal – first place	1971 Pirae	3000 m steeplechase
Gold medal – first place	1971 Pirae	4x400 m relay
Gold medal – first place	1969 Port Moresby	10,000 m
Gold medal – first place	1969 Port Moresby	3000 m steeplechase
Gold medal – first place	1966 Nouméa	3000 m steeplechase
Silver medal – second place	1979 Suva	1500 m
Silver medal – second place	1979 Suva	3000 m steeplechase
Silver medal – second place	1975 Tumon	3000 m steeplechase
Silver medal – second place	1966 Nouméa	10,000 m
Bronze medal – third place	1975 Tumon	10,000 m
Bronze medal – third place	1969 Port Moresby	5000 m
- Updated on 26 April 2013

Usaia Naiteitei Sotutu (born 20 September 1947 in Tavea, Bua, Fiji) is a former runner who represented Fiji at the 1972 Summer Olympics.

== Personal life ==
Usaia was born in 1947 to Tevita Naiteitei and Akisi Buasega in Fiji. He represented Fiji in several international track and field competitions, including the South Pacific Games and the Summer Olympics. Shortly after participating in the Olympics, he attended Brigham Young University in Provo, Utah, on a full scholarship for track and cross-country. While attending BYU, he converted to the Church of Jesus Christ of Latter-day Saints. In 1973, he took a break from his college and track career to serve a two-year mission for the Church back in Fiji. He went on to marry Catherine Marie Olson in 1975, who was also studying at BYU. Upon finishing his education in Provo, he, Cathie, and their first son, David, moved back to Fiji, and they lived there for the next three years. During that time he taught physical education, and had two more children with Cathie: Juliette and Charles. The Family then moved to Kent, Washington in 1980. There, he went to work for Boeing, and they had two more daughters, Jennifer and Diana. He and Cathie were divorced in 2004, but he still lives in the Seattle, Washington area and still works for Boeing.

== Running/athletics career ==
Usaia was a noted runner in Fiji and was selected to represent Fiji in the South Pacific Games (now Pacific Games) numerous times. In 1972, he was chosen to represent Fiji in the Summer Olympics. He did not win any medals.

== Achievements ==
Year	Competition	Venue	Position	Event	Notes
Representing Fiji
1966	South Pacific Games	Nouméa, New Caledonia	3rd	10,000 m	33:24.7 min
1966	South Pacific Games	Nouméa, New Caledonia	1st	3000 m steeplechase	9:59.2 min
1969	South Pacific Games	Port Moresby, Papua New Guinea	3rd	5000 m	16:05.0 min
1969	South Pacific Games	Port Moresby, Papua New Guinea	1st	10,000 m	33:13.2 min
1969	South Pacific Games	Port Moresby, Papua New Guinea	1st	3000 m steeplechase	9:48.8 min
1971	South Pacific Games	Pirae, French Polynesia	1st	5000 m	15:15.4 min
1971	South Pacific Games	Pirae, French Polynesia	1st	10,000 m	32:14.6 min
1971	South Pacific Games	Pirae, French Polynesia	1st	3000 m steeplechase	9:24.0 min
1971	South Pacific Games	Pirae, French Polynesia	1st	4 × 400 m relay	3:18.5 min
1975	South Pacific Games	Tumon, Guam	1st	1500 m	4:04.41 min
1975	South Pacific Games	Tumon, Guam	3rd	10,000 m	32:58.94 min
1975	South Pacific Games	Tumon, Guam	2nd	3000 m steeplechase	9:51.4 min
1979	South Pacific Games	Suva, Fiji	2nd	1500 m	3:59.97 min
1979	South Pacific Games	Suva, Fiji	2nd	3000 m steeplechase	9:28.06 min

== After Retirement ==
It is not known when he retired, but he was ushered into the Fiji Sports Hall of Fame in 1993.

== Internal References ==
- Fiji at the 1972 Summer Olympics
