= Athletics at the 1985 South Pacific Mini Games =

Athletics at the II South Pacific Mini Games
- Dates: August 1–9
- Host city: Rarotonga, Cook Islands
- Venue: Tereora National Stadium
- Level: Senior
- Events: 40 (23 men, 17 women)
- Participation: 12 nations

Athletics competitions at the 1985 South Pacific Mini Games were held at the Tereora National Stadium in Rarotonga, Cook Islands, between August 1–9, 1985.

A total of 40 events were contested, 23 by men and 17 by women.

== Medal summary ==
Medal winners and their results were published on the Athletics Weekly webpage courtesy of Tony Isaacs and Børre Lilloe, and on the Oceania Athletics Association webpage by Bob Snow.

Complete results can also be found on the Oceania Athletics Association, and on the Athletics PNG webpages.

=== Men ===
Event	Gold		Silver		Bronze	
100 metres (wind: +1.8 m/s)	Takale Tuna (PNG)	10.84	Jerry Jeremiah (VAN)	10.93	Lapule Tamean (PNG)	10.99
200 metres (wind: +1.4 m/s)	Takale Tuna (PNG)	21.74	Lapule Tamean (PNG)	22.13	Jerry Jeremiah (VAN)	22.19
400 metres	Takale Tuna (PNG)	49.22	Joe Rodan (FIJ)	49.80	Orisi Fotu (FIJ)	50.04
800 metres	John D'Siguria (PNG)	1:56.37	Charlie Oliver (SOL)	1:57.44	Albert Fafale (SOL)	1:58.41
1500 metres	Binesh Prasad (FIJ)	4:06.65	John Siguria (PNG)	4:07.19	Semi Vuetibau (FIJ)	4:07.73
5000 metres	Tau John Tokwepota (PNG)	15:47.71	Roman Yanewai (PNG)	15:55.08	Binesh Prasad (FIJ)	15:58.29
10000 metres	Tau John Tokwepota (PNG)	32:53.69	Jean-Michel Boulanger (NCL)	33:58.52	Pau Naraori (PNG)	34:30.16
Marathon	Jean-Michel Boulanger (NCL)	2:34:37	Tau John Tokwepota (PNG)	2:38:51	Yannick Moglia (NCL)	2:48:26
3000 metres steeplechase	Belsa Malanga (SOL)	9:54.98	Shiri Chand (FIJ)	9:59.46	Bayu Gigi (PNG)	9:59.72
110 metres hurdles (wind: -0.1 m/s)	(French Polynesia) /Robert Tupuhoé (PYF)	15.82	Joe Rodan (FIJ)	15.95	(French Polynesia) /Simplicio Amaru (PYF)	16.19
400 metres hurdles	Joe Rodan (FIJ)	54.04	(French Polynesia) /Robert Tupuhoé (PYF)	54.98	(French Polynesia) /Simplicio Amaru (PYF)	56.53
High jump	Clément Poaniewa (NCL)	2.03	Édouard Robsen (VAN)	2.00	(French Polynesia) /Vetea Dehors (PYF)	1.97
Pole vault	(French Polynesia) /Gérard Braye (PYF)	4.10	(French Polynesia) /Thierry Tekuataoa (PYF)	4.10	(French Polynesia) /Sylvain Pautu (PYF)	4.00
Long jump	Armand Welepa (NCL)	7.11 (wind: +1.5 m/s)	Jean-Jacques Honda (NCL)	7.03	Richard Lerori (PNG)	6.69
Triple jump	Steeve Druminy (NCL)	14.98 (wind: 0.0 m/s)	Clément Poaniewa (NCL)	14.78 (wind: 0.0 m/s)	(French Polynesia) /Thierry Temauri (PYF)	14.34 (wind: +1.8 m/s)
Shot put	Sanitesi Latu (TGA)	15.84	Frédéric Cassier (NCL)	14.76	(French Polynesia) /Jean-Claude Duhaze (PYF)	14.22
Discus throw	(French Polynesia) /Jean-Claude Duhaze (PYF)	47.62	(French Polynesia) /Gordon Barff (PYF)	45.38	Sanitesi Latu (TGA)	44.54
Hammer throw	(French Polynesia) /Jean-Claude Duhaze (PYF)	54.82	Frédéric Cassier (NCL)	54.24	Gaston Musumusu (NCL)	46.16
Javelin throw	(Wallis and Futuna) /Fabiano Fakataulavelua (WLF)	74.54	(Wallis and Futuna) /Thomas Ulutuipalelei (WLF)	69.50	(Wallis and Futuna) /Sepeliano Panuve (WLF)	67.32
Decathlon	(French Polynesia) /Glenn Barff (PYF)	5805	(French Polynesia) /Didier Ledoare (PYF)	5576	(Wallis and Futuna) /Roger Lakalaka (WLF)	5333
20 Kilometres Road Walk	Uaongo Areai (COK)	2:01:29	Moetu Tangitamaiti (COK)	2:12:15	Andrew Lee (FIJ)	2:19:01
4 x 100 metres relay	Fiji; Joe Rodan; Inoke Bainimoli; Orisi Fotu; Lorima Sautu	42.46	Papua New Guinea; Emmanuel Mack; Robert Karava; Lohia Raka; Takale Tuna	42.99	New Caledonia; Fabrice Bernanos; Steve Druminy; Eddy Chenu; Rudy Brizard	43.21
4 x 400 metres relay	Vanuatu; Johnny Kahi; Daniel Dam; Ruben Wotu; Jerry Jeremiah	3:23.97	Fiji; Joe Rodan; Orisi Fotu; Binesh Prasad; Sawelio Lutuni	3:25.30	/French Polynesia; Yves Martin; Patrice Manuel; Simplicio Amaru; Robert Tupuhoe	3:25.86

=== Women ===
Event	Gold		Silver		Bronze	
100 metres (wind: +2.5 m/s)	Brigitte Hardel (NCL)	12.21 w	Rogot Taule (PNG)	12.60 w	Iammo Launa (PNG)	12.81 w
200 metres (wind: +2.8 m/s)	Brigitte Hardel (NCL)	25.62 w	Rogot Taule (PNG)	26.30 w	Cathy Rasehai (PNG)	27.03 'ww
400 metres	Brigitte Hardel (NCL)	57.37	Mary Estelle Kapalu (VAN)	58.95	Hilda Roy (PNG)	60.95
800 metres	Attina Sawtell (COK)	2:17.06	Reena Devi (FIJ)	2:19.34	Alice Nicolas (VAN)	2:24.00
1500 metres	Attina Sawtell (COK)	4:49.21	Donna Cavuilati (FIJ)	4:50.81	Mary Sanderson (PNG)	4:50.84
3000 metres	Mary Sanderson (PNG)	10:27.79	Nuta Rorfiake (PNG)	10:32.88	Donna Cavuilati (FIJ)	10:58.86
Marathon	Maria Lifu (PNG)	3:17:13	Lily Ngaata (COK)	3:49:25	Tumoana Pakari (COK)	3:51:49
100 metres hurdles (wind: -2.6 m/s)	Brigitte Hardel (NCL)	15.67	Ghislaine Saint-Prix (NCL)	16.65	(French Polynesia) /Valérie Vahirua (PYF)	18.34
400 metres hurdles	(French Polynesia) /Léonne Ley (PYF)	65.50	Véronique Becker (NCL)	69.01	(French Polynesia) /Jessie Manutahi (PYF)	69.43
High jump	(French Polynesia) /Albertine An (PYF)	1.68	Brigitte Hardel (NCL)	1.65	Pascale Bouvet (NCL)	1.58
Long jump	Brigitte Hardel (NCL)	6.09 (wind: +0.0 m/s)	Cathy Rasehai (PNG)	5.44 (wind: m/s)	(French Polynesia) /Albertine An (PYF)	5.25 (wind: m/s)
Shot put	Brigitte Hardel (NCL)	12.60	Anna Tulitau (NCL)	11.92	Iammo Launa (PNG)	11.83
Discus throw	(French Polynesia) /Sandra Bordes (PYF)	41.22	Anna Tulitau (NCL)	38.52	Joanne Tinitali (ASA)	37.78
Javelin throw	(Wallis and Futuna) /Atelaika Vakalepu (WLF)	47.90	Marina Heafala (NCL)	46.70	(Wallis and Futuna) /Malia-Losa Tuiasoa (WLF)	46.34
Heptathlon	Iammo Launa (PNG)	4634	(French Polynesia) /Valérie Vahirua (PYF)	3791	Rosie Ah Wong (SAM)	3414
4 x 100 metres relay	Papua New Guinea; Yal Jonathon; Cathy Rasehai; Rogot Taule; Iammo Launa	49.97	/French Polynesia; Lisa Manutahi; Léonne Ley; Cathy Mu Kwai Chuan; Valérie Vahirua	50.66	Cook Islands; Erin Tierney; Julia Tipokoroa; Tangianau Vogel; Kura Drollet	53.86
4 x 400 metres relay	New Caledonia; Mariella Tessier; Patricia Chevalier; Véronique Becker; Brigitte Hardel	4:03.37	Vanuatu; Rona Carlot; Alice Nicholas; Ruth Kanas; Mary Estelle Kapalu	4:06.86	Papua New Guinea; Cathy Rasehai; Iammo Launa; Yal Jonathon; Hilda Roy	4:08.47

== Medal table (unofficial) ==
* Host nation (Cook Islands)

Rank	Nation	Gold	Silver	Bronze	Total
1	New Caledonia (NCL)	11	11	4	26
2	Papua New Guinea (PNG)	10	9	10	29
3	French Polynesia (PYF)	8	6	10	24
4	Fiji (FIJ)	3	6	5	14
5	Cook Islands (COK)*	3	2	2	7
6	Wallis and Futuna (WLF)	2	1	3	6
7	Vanuatu (VAN)	1	4	2	7
8	Solomon Islands (SOL)	1	1	1	3
9	Tonga (TON)	1	0	1	2
10	American Samoa (ASA)	0	0	1	1
10	Western Samoa (WSM)	0	0	1	1
Totals (11 entries)		40	40	40	120

== Participation (unofficial) ==
Athletes from the following 12 countries were reported to participate:

- American Samoa
- Cook Islands
- Fiji
- /French Polynesia
- Nauru
- New Caledonia
- Papua New Guinea
- Solomon Islands
- Tonga
- Vanuatu
- /Wallis and Futuna
- Western Samoa
