= Torika Varo =

Female Fijian athlete

Personal information
- Born: 1935 (age 89–90) Lautoka, Colony of Fiji, British Empire

Sport
- Sport: Athletics
- Event: Long jump

Torika Varo was a Fijian athlete. She competed in sprints and the long jump and became known as "Fiji's Flying Housewife".

== Early life ==
Torika Varo Rakabu was born in 1937 in Lautoka, the second largest city in Fiji, which is in the Ba Province on the west coast of the country's largest island Viti Levu.

== Athletics ==
Varo started to compete in athletics competitions around 1952, representing Lautoka from 1953 to 1957 in 50-yard, 100-yard and 220-yard sprints, as well as the long jump. She then left the sport to have a family. In 1964, having by then had four children, she returned to athletics and in 1966 was picked to compete for Fiji in the 1966 South Pacific Games, held in Nouméa, capital of New Caledonia. There she won two individual gold medals for the 100 and 200 metres, a team gold for the 4 x 100 metres relay and a bronze medal in the long jump. It was in Noumea that she began to be called "Fiji's Flying Housewife". Varo also competed in the 1969 South Pacific Games held in Port Moresby, capital of Papua New Guinea, at the age of 32. She won a silver medal in the 400 metres and a bronze in the 100m.

Varo was inducted into the Fiji Association of Sports and National Olympic Committee Hall of Fame in 1995. Her Fijian record for the 100 metres, set in 1966, still stood at the time of her induction.
