= József Csík =

Hungarian javelin thrower (1946–2023)

Personal information
- Born: 1 January 1946 Üllő, Hungary
- Died: 4 October 2023 (aged 77)

Sport
- Sport: Track and field
Medal record
Representing Hungary
Summer Universiade
Silver medal – second place	1970 Turin	Javelin throw

József Csík (1 January 1946 – 4 October 2023) was a Hungarian javelin thrower who competed in the 1972 Summer Olympics. He was born in Üllő on 1 January 1946, and died on 4 October 2023, at the age of 77.
