= Miriama Tuisorisori-Chambault =

Fijian sprinter

Personal information
- Nationality: Fijian
- Born: 27 March 1952 (age 73)

Sport
- Sport: Sprinting
- Event: 100 metres

Miriama Kadavu Tuisorisori-Chambault (born 27 March 1952) is a Fijian sprinter. She competed in the women's 100 metres at the 1984 Summer Olympics. She was the first woman to represent Fiji at the Olympics.
