= Jean Salmon =

French equestrian

Personal information
- Nationality: French
- Born: 21 May 1898
- Died: 26 May 1991 (aged 93)

Sport
- Sport: Equestrian

Jean Salmon (21 May 1898 – 26 May 1991) was a French equestrian. He competed in two events at the 1956 Summer Olympics.
