= Spearfishing at the Micronesian Games =

International sporting event

Spearfishing competitions have been held at the quadrennial Micronesian Games since the 1994 Micronesian Games, with modern spearfishing replacing traditional spearfishing at the 2006 Micronesian Games.

== Traditional spearfishing ==
=== History ===
Spearfishing was first featured at the 1994 Micronesian Games, the third edition of the games. Guam won its first gold team medal at the 1998 Micronesian Games. At the 2002 Micronesian Games, Palau won team gold, Kosrae and Guam tied for silver and Pohnpei won bronze. Guamanian Roberto Cabreza won the individual event that year.

== Modern spearfishing ==
Modern spearfishing uses spearguns instead of sharp-pointed tools

=== Rules ===
The competition features a men's individual and team event. The winner is decided by weighing the catches of fish caught in a given time; catches must weigh at least 1 kilogram or 2.2 pounds to be counted. Fishing for sea turtles, the ray-finned fishes humphead wrasse, green humphead parrotfish, balloonfish, porcupinefish and cartilaginous fish such as sharks and rays is prohibited. Spearfishers are allowed to use diving masks, snorkels, a pair of fins, a weight belt and a diving knife but are not allowed to use breathing apparatus such as scuba sets as the competition is freedive only. Competitors are only allowed to have two spearguns and cannot have both of them in the water at the same time, the spearguns must also be powered by rubber.

=== History ===
The 2006 Micronesian Games hosted in Saipan, Northern Mariana Islands, became the first to use modern spearfishing equipment after the owner of a diving shop on the island acquired the right to distribute modern spearguns and long swimfins from a Cressi-Sub company in 2005. Prior to this acquisition, residents of the territory had to travel to Guam to purchase such equipment. Captain Felix Sasamoto led the Northern Mariana Islands spearfishing team to victory defeating the favored teams of Guam and Palau. Sasamoto also won a gold medal in the individual event that year and would later set up the Marianas Apnea Spearfishing Club, along with Morito Asai and others. The club conducted a trial competition to select the Northern Mariana Islands' spearfishers for the 2010 Micronesian Games but the defending champions failed to make the podium in both events.

At the 2014 Micronesian Games in Pohnpei, Palauan Clint Madracheluib won gold in the individual event with his teammate Moy Shmull losing second place to Guamanian Ray Flores as one of the fish that he caught was mutilated by a shark. At the delayed 2024 Micronesian Games in Majuro, manager James Borja led his team to win Guam's fourth consecutive team gold medal. Guamanian Michael Genereux also won his second consecutive individual spearfishing gold medal.

=== Editions ===
Games	Year	Host	Events	Best nation(s)
VI	2006	Saipan, Northern Mariana Islands	2	Northern Mariana Islands (2)
VII	2010	Koror, Palau	2	Palau (1); Guam (1)
VIII	2014	(Pohnpei State) Pohnpei, Pohnpei	2	Palau (1); Guam (1)
IX	2018	(Yap State) Yap, Yap	2	Guam (2)
X	2024	Majuro, Marshall Islands	2	Guam (2)

=== Medal table ===
Rank	Association	Gold	Silver	Bronze	Total
1	Guam	6	3	1	10
2	Palau	2	4	2	8
3	Northern Mariana Islands	2	0	0	2
4	Pohnpei	0	2	4	6
5	Nauru	0	1	1	2
6	Kosrae	0	0	1	1
6	Yap	0	0	1	1
8	Chuuk	0	0	0	0
8	Kiribati	0	0	0	0
8	Marshall Islands	0	0	0	0
Totals (10 entries)		10	10	10	30

Source: As of September 2024.

== See also ==
- Spearfishing in Guam
