= James Borja =

Guamanian sports administrator

Personal information
- Nationality: Guam

Sport
- Sport: Spearfishing
- Event: Team
Medal record
Spearfishing
Representing Guam
Micronesian Games
Gold medal – first place	2014 Pohnpei	Team
Silver medal – second place	2006 Saipan	Team
Silver medal – second place	2002 Pohnpei	Team

James Borja is a Guamanian sports administrator, spearfishing manager and former spearfisher. He was Guam's Chef de Mission at the 2024 Summer Olympics.

== Career ==
At the 2006 Micronesian Games, he won a silver medal in the team spearfishing event. At the 2014 Micronesian Games, he won a gold medal in the team spearfishing event.

Borja as president of the Marianas Underwater Fishing Federation was the tournament director of the 2017 Inter-Pacific Spearfishing Competition, the first to be hosted in Guam. Borja stated that "twenty years ago, it was a dream to compete in the Inter-Pacific [Spearfishing Competition] and spearfish with some of the best in the world" and that now it was a "reality for Guam".

He succeeded his brother Kenneth Borja as Guam's spearfishing manager at the 2018 Micronesian Games leading his team to victory. He repeated this success at the 2024 Micronesian Games. He was Guam's Chef de Mission at the 2024 Summer Olympics in which they sent eight competitors in six sports, their joint largest delegation since the 1996 Summer Olympics.
