= Micronesian Games =

Multi-sport event

The Micronesian Games, often known as the Micro Games, are a quadrennial international multi-sport event featuring competitors from the countries and districts of the region of Micronesia in the Pacific Ocean.

The four states of the Federated States of Micronesia – Chuuk, Kosrae, Pohnpei and Yap – field separate teams at the games. The other entrants are the independent countries of Kiribati, the Marshall Islands, Nauru and Palau, and the U.S. territories of Guam and the Northern Mariana Islands. The inaugural games were held in 1969 featuring the six districts of the U.S.-administered Trust Territory of the Pacific Islands. The second edition was not held until 1990, but the games have since been held every four years (with the exception of the COVID-19 pandemic).

== History ==
The inaugural games were held in 1969 in Saipan, Northern Mariana Islands, under the name MicrOlympics (or Micronesian Olympics). The competition was limited to the six districts of the US-administered Trust Territory of the Pacific Islands. It was a collaboration of local residents and American Peace Corps volunteers and featured a strong American influence, with the opening ceremony held on the Fourth of July and several U.S. military units playing a role.

The second edition edition of the Micronesian Games did not take place until 1990, by which time the region had undergone major political changes. Guam first participated in that year, while non-US territories were then invited later in the 1990s with Nauru (1994) and Kiribati (1998) making their debuts.

The 2010 Micronesian Games were initially due to be held in Majuro (Marshall Islands), until the hosts withdrew. The 2010 Games were hosted by Palau. The Federated States of Micronesia won the bidding to host the 2014 Micronesian Games in Pohnpei State, and later won again against CNMI for the 2018 Micronesian Games, held in Yap State.

After the 2018 Micronesian Games in Yap State, the Republic of the Marshall Islands was set to host the 10th edition of the Micronesian Games in Majuro; but due to the COVID-19 pandemic the Majuro MicroGames was pushed back to 2023. Following a May 23 virtual meeting of the Micronesian Games Council, the 10th MicroGames was moved to June 15–24, 2024 in Majuro.

== All-time medal table ==
Rank	Association	Gold	Silver	Bronze	Total
1	Guam	289	188	147	624
2	Palau	285	317	293	895
3	Northern Mariana Islands	256	220	179	655
4	Marshall Islands	175	145	177	497
5	Pohnpei	122	174	151	447
6	Nauru	120	56	29	205
7	Yap	53	71	74	198
8	Chuuk	40	57	84	181
9	Kosrae	19	21	69	109
10	Ponape/Kusaie (defunct)	17	16	10	43
11	Kiribati	5	25	25	55
Totals (11 entries)		1,381	1,290	1,238	3,909

Source: As of March 19, 2023.

== Editions ==
Overview of the Micronesian Games
Edition	Year	Host	Start	End	Sports	Events	Nations	Top association	Ref
I	1969	Saipan, Trust Territory of the Pacific Islands	4 July	12 July			6	Palau	
II	1990	Saipan, Northern Mariana Islands	7 July	15 July			7	Guam	
III	1994	Hagåtña, Guam	26 March	2 April			9	Guam	
IV	1998	Koror, Palau	1 August	9 August			9	Nauru	
V	2002	(Pohnpei State) Palikir, Pohnpei	21 July	30 July			9	Northern Mariana Islands	
VI	2006	Saipan, Northern Mariana Islands	23 June	4 July			9	Guam	
VII	2010	Koror, Palau	1 August	10 August			8	Palau	
VIII	2014	(Pohnpei State) Pohnpei, Pohnpei	20 July	29 July			9	Guam	
IX	2018	(Yap State) Yap, Yap	15 July	27 July			10	Palau	
X	2024	Majuro, Marshall Islands	15 June	24 June			10	Northern Mariana Islands	
XI	2028	Nauru	Future event						

== Competitors ==
Participants include four sovereign countries (the Marshall Islands, Kiribati, Nauru, and Palau), a commonwealth in political union with the United States (the Northern Mariana Islands), an organized unincorporated territory of the United States (Guam), and the four constituent States of the Federated States of Micronesia (Chuuk, Pohnpei, Kosrae and Yap, which compete separately from one another).

These ten countries, States and territories are all located within the Micronesian region of Oceania.

All participants also take part in the Pacific Games, although the Federated States of Micronesia competes as a unified country there.

== Events ==
Athletes compete in the fields of athletics, baseball, basketball, beach volleyball, fast pitch softball, association football, golf, slow pitch softball, spearfishing, swimming, table tennis, triathlon, va'a canoe, volleyball and wrestling, as well as the "Micronesian all-around", which includes events like coconut tree climbing and coconut husking.

The Micronesian Games thus combine events that may be found in other international competitions with events more specific to Micronesian countries.

=== Micronesian all-around ===
The Micronesian all-around (sometimes shortened to Micro all-round) is an unusual multi-event contest practiced at the Micronesian Games, a kind of pentathlon featuring skills from a traditional island lifestyle. The 2018 version included the following events:

- Coconut climbing (men only): Participants climb up and down three coconut trees in the fastest possible time.
- Coconut husking: Participants remove the husks from 10 coconuts as fast as possible.
- Coconut grating (women only): Participants fully grate five of the coconuts they had earlier husked, again in the fastest possible time.
- Swimming: A race that starts with running from shore into the water, a swim and a short underwater swim to a target, and then a swim back to shore.
- Diving: Participants free dive to retrieve five objects from the sea bottom in the fastest possible time.
- Spear throwing: Participants throw spears at targets placed in the water.

== See also ==
- Pacific Games
- Athletics at the Micronesian Games
- Football at the Micronesian Games
- Spearfishing at the Micronesian Games
