= Moy Shmull =

Palauan spearfisher

Personal information
- Nationality: Palau

Sport
- Sport: Spearfishing
- Event(s): Individual, Team
Medal record
Spearfishing
Representing Palau
Micronesian Games
Gold medal – first place	2010 Koror	Individual
Silver medal – second place	2014 Pohnpei	Team
Bronze medal – third place	2014 Pohnpei	Individual

Moy Shmull is a Palauan spearfisher.

== Career ==
He won gold in the individual spearfishing event at the 2010 Micronesian Games. At the subsequent 2014 Micronesian Games, Shmull lost second place to Guamanian Ray Flores as one of the fish that he caught was mutilated by a shark. He also won a silver medal as part of the team event at the same games.
