= Sasamoto =

Sasamoto (written: 笹本) is a Japanese surname. Notable people with the surname include:

- Aki Sasamoto (笹本 晃, born 1980), Japanese artist
- Felix Sasamoto, Northern Mariana Islands spearfisher
- Makoto Sasamoto (笹本 睦, born 1977), Japanese sport wrestler
- Tsuneko Sasamoto (笹本 恒子, 1914–2022), Japanese photographer
- Yūichi Sasamoto (笹本 祐一, born 1963), Japanese writer
- Yuko Sasamoto (笹本 優子, born 1973), Japanese voice actress
