= Mike Cassidy (spearfisher) =

Guamanian spearfisher

Personal information
- Nationality: Guam

Sport
- Sport: Spearfishing
- Event(s): Individual, Team
Medal record
Spearfishing
Representing Guam
Micronesian Games
Gold medal – first place	2014 Pohnpei	Team
Gold medal – first place	2018 Yap	Team

Michael Cassidy is a Guamanian spearfisher.

== Career ==
At the 2014 and 2018 Micronesian Games, he won gold medals as part of the team events, the latter of which he won as a safety diver. He also came fourth in the individual spearfishing event at the 2018 games.

As a member of the Marianas Yacht Club, he stated in April 2023 that he is working on developing a youth sailing program in Guam that can compete at the 2027 Pacific Games and has applied for the Guam Sailing Federation to be re-added to the Guam National Olympic Committee.
