= Olivier Bardoux =

French spearfisher

Personal information
- Nationality: France

Sport
- Sport: Spearfishing
- Event(s): Individual, Team
Medal record
Spearfishing
Representing France
Euro-African Spearfishing Championship
Gold medal – first place	1997 Marseille	Team
Silver medal – second place	1997 Marseille	Individual

Olivier Bardoux is a French spearfisher.

== Career ==
Bardoux won gold at the 1997 Euro-African Spearfishing Championship in Marseille as part of the team event and won silver in the individual event behind his teammate Gérard Ségura.
