= Michael Genereux =

Guamanian spearfisher

Personal information
- Nationality: Guam

Sport
- Sport: Spearfishing
- Event(s): Individual, Team
Medal record
Spearfishing
Representing Guam
Micronesian Games
Gold medal – first place	2010 Koror	Team
Gold medal – first place	2018 Yap	Individual
Gold medal – first place	2018 Yap	Team
Gold medal – first place	2024 Majuro	Individual
Gold medal – first place	2024 Majuro	Team
Silver medal – second place	2006 Saipan	Individual
Silver medal – second place	2006 Saipan	Team
Bronze medal – third place	2010 Koror	Individual

Michael "Todd" Genereux is a Guamanian spearfisher.

== Career ==
At the 2006 Micronesian Games, he won silver medals in the individual and team events. At the 2010 Micronesian Games, he won a gold medal in the team event and a bronze medal in the individual event. At the consecutive Micronesian Games of 2018 and 2024, he won four gold medals: two individual and two as part of a team.
