= Felix Sasamoto =

Northern Mariana Islands spearfisher

Personal information
- Nationality: Northern Mariana Islands
- Born: Felix T. Sasamoto Jr.
- Spouse: Suzette
- Children: 1

Sport
- Sport: Spearfishing
- Event(s): Individual, Team
Medal record
Spearfishing
Representing Northern Mariana Islands
Micronesian Games
Gold medal – first place	2006 Saipan	Individual
Gold medal – first place	2006 Saipan	Team

Felix T. Sasamoto Jr. is a Northern Mariana Islands spearfisher.

== Career ==
At the 2006 Micronesian Games, he won gold medals in the individual and team events. Sasamoto along with Morito Asai and others established the Marianas Apnea Spearfishing Club following the wins. Sasamoto came first in a trial competition conducted by the club to determine the Northern Mariana Islands' spearfishers for the 2010 Micronesian Games but finished sixth in the event.

== Personal life ==
Sasamoto's father Felix Aguon Sasamoto was the son of a Chamorro woman and a Japanese agriculturist stationed on the islands prior to the Battle of Saipan. His father died in 2023.

Sasamoto and his wife Suzette have a child and grandchildren.
