= Guy Gilpatric =

American journalist

John Guy Gilpatric (January 21, 1896 – July 7, 1950) was an American pilot, flight instructor, journalist, short-story writer and novelist, best known for his Mr. Glencannon stories.

Fascinated with stories of the Wright brothers as a child, he aspired to become a pilot in early life and he received his pilot's license when 16-years-old. On November 28, 1912, he set a new United States altitude record by achieving an altitude of 4,665 ft (1,422 m). While still a teenager, he began working as a stunt pilot and as a flight instructor. During World War I, Gilpatric enlisted in the U.S. Army Air Service as a first lieutenant. He was stationed overseas as an engineering officer in the First Aero Squadron, American Expeditionary Forces (AEF). Following the war, he lived as an expatriate in France, working as a journalist and a publicity agent. He moved back to the United States in 1940, in the early phases of World War II. He is credited with popularizing spearfishing in the late 1930s, and influencing diving pioneers such as Jacques-Yves Cousteau and Hans Hass.

Gilpatric died as part of a suicide pact with his wife in July 1950, after she was diagnosed with breast cancer. He shot his wife in the back of the head, then shot himself. They both left notes for friends and family, saying that they chose "mercy bullets" over "magic bullets". It is widely believed that Maude Gilpatric did not have cancer, and that her doctor had read the wrong medical chart when making the diagnosis.

== Biography ==
John Guy Gilpatric was born on January 21, 1896, in New York. He was the son of a Scottish immigrant. In his autobiographical book Flying Stories, he writes that he was seven years old when he saw photographs of the Wright brothers’ first flights, and decided he wanted to become a pilot. He got his pilot's license at 16, in 1912. On November 28 of that same year, at Dominguez Field in what is now Carson, California, he set a new United States altitude record. Flying a Deperdussin airplane, with a passenger aboard, he achieved an altitude of 4,665 ft (1,422 m).

While still a teenager, he began working as a stunt pilot and as a flight instructor. He taught at both the Moisant Flying School and the Sloane Aviation School. He was a test pilot and instructor at the Garden City Aerodrome in New York, where in 1915 he joined the Heinrich Aeroplane Company, quickly becoming chief pilot. In June of the same year, he moved to Toronto to instruct at the Curtiss Flying Boat School and was involved in training Canadian military pilots.

In a 1931 letter to Time magazine, he wrote, "Early in the spring of 1914, I landed a Sloane-Deperdussin monoplane, 50 h.p. Gnome motor (some power fer them days, by gravy!) in the sheep meadow at 66th Street [New York City]. Was arrested for something—possibly, publicity for the cop who arrested me— and discharged by Magistrate MacQuade next morning. The Aero Club of America suspended my license for six months."

He was a demonstration, stunt and test pilot and performed in various movies. For one film, the script called for him to crash an airplane. Gilpatric did so and survived the crash. However, the footage did not come out well, so he had to repeat the stunt.

When the United States entered World War I in 1917, Gilpatric enlisted in the U.S. Army Air Service as a first lieutenant. He was stationed overseas as an engineering officer in the First Aero Squadron, American Expeditionary Forces (AEF). He then became a journalist in France for some time before moving to Antibes, where he worked as a publicity agent. It was there that he got the inspiration for his Mr. Glencannon stories, which were published in the Saturday Evening Post. In 1940, he and his wife Louise returned to the US. In 1943, his book Action in the North Atlantic was made into a film.

== Works ==
Gilpatric is best known for his short stories about Scottish ship engineer Colin Glencannon, published in the Saturday Evening Post and bundled in numerous books. A 39-episode TV series starring Thomas Mitchell as Colin Glencannon was produced in 1959.

Other works include Action in the North Atlantic, which was made into a movie starring Humphrey Bogart, and which was nominated for an Academy Award for best story in 1943. In Flying Stories Gilpatric describes the adventures of his early years as a pilot. His collection of short stories entitled Brownstone Front takes place in New York City during the end of the 19th century and the start of the 20th. His novel French Summer is a humorous romance which revolves around vacationers at the French Riviera in the late 1920s.

His character Francis X. Olvaney, illustrated as a crooked Tammany Hall politician responsible for dangerous slum areas, appears in stories contained in both Brownstone Front and Flying Stories, lending credence to the opinion that many of Gilpatric's short stories are autobiographical in nature.

In 1938, Gilpatric published The Compleat Goggler (the archaic title a jocose reference to Izaak Walton's The Compleat Angler), considered the first comprehensive guide to spearfishing. It outlines methods of constructing equipment, and techniques for spearing and cooking the fish. It was republished in 1957 as a free giveaway with an annual subscription to Skin Diver Magazine. It is now out of print, and copies sell for up to $1000.

In the late 1930s Gilpatric was living and spearfishing in the French Riviera where he influenced diving pioneers like Jacques-Yves Cousteau and Hans Hass to begin spearfishing.

== Murder-suicide pact ==
When his wife, Maude Louise Gilpatric, learned that she had breast cancer in July 1950, they decided to commit suicide together. While waiting for the diagnosis to be confirmed, they explored the confusing array of treatment options with multiple experts. He shot her in the back of the head, then shot himself. They left notes for friends and family, saying they chose "mercy bullets" over "magic bullets". Their bodies were found in their Santa Barbara home by a house guest.

Although it was never proven, it is widely believed that the doctor had read the wrong medical chart and that Maude did not have cancer.

== Sources ==
- Glencannon lapt de oorlog aan zijn laars (Dutch translation of Mr. Glencannon Ignores the War - ISBN 978-90-70348-50-2; Smit & Wytzes 1992)
- Internet Movie Database
- Kulczyk, David. (2009). Death In California: The Bizarre, Freakish, and Just Curious Ways People Die in the Golden State. Craven Street Books. P90 ISBN 978-1-884995-57-6
