= Action in the North Atlantic =

1943 film by Lloyd Bacon

- Theatrical release half-sheet display poster
- Directed by: Lloyd Bacon; Byron Haskin (uncredited); Raoul Walsh (uncredited)
- Screenplay by: John Howard Lawson
- Story by: Guy Gilpatric
- Produced by: Jerry Wald
- Starring: Humphrey Bogart; Raymond Massey
- Cinematography: Ted D. McCord
- Edited by: George Amy
- Music by: Adolph Deutsch
- Production company: Warner Bros. Pictures
- Distributed by: Warner Bros. Pictures
- Release date: June 12, 1943 (US)
- Running time: 127 minutes
- Country: United States
- Language: English
- Budget: $2,231,000
- Box office: $3,460,000

Action in the North Atlantic is a 1943 American war film from Warner Bros. Pictures. It was produced by Jerry Wald, directed by Lloyd Bacon, and adapted by John Howard Lawson from a story by Guy Gilpatric. The film stars Humphrey Bogart and Raymond Massey as officers in the U.S. Merchant Marine during World War II.

Like other Hollywood war films made in the initial years of U.S. involvement in WWII, Action in the North Atlantic was regarded as a means of stirring patriotism and mobilizing the home front. The film tells the story of the unsung heroes in the Merchant Marine who brave attacks by German bomber planes and U-boats to deliver vital supplies to the Allies during the Battle of the Atlantic. The New York Times movie reviewer Bosley Crowther wrote, "it's a good thing to have a picture which waves the flag for the merchant marine. Those boys are going through hell-and-high-water, as 'Action in the North Atlantic' shows."

== Plot ==
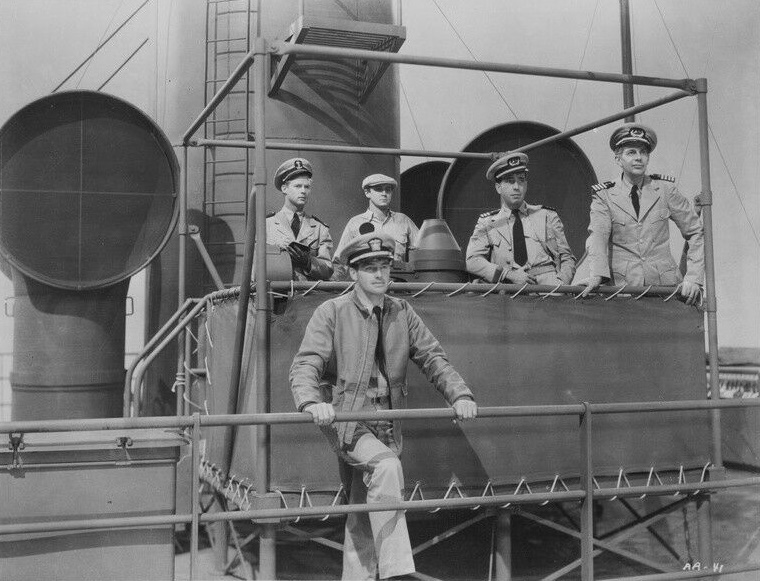
Humphrey Bogart and Raymond Massey in Action in the North Atlantic

An American oil tanker, the SS Northern Star, commanded by Captain Steve Jarvis, is sunk in the North Atlantic by a German U-boat. Along with First Officer Joe Rossi, Jarvis boards a lifeboat with other crewmen, which is rammed and sunk by the U-boat that torpedoed their ship. The survivors are finally rescued after eleven days adrift on a wooden life raft.

During a brief interlude ashore, Steve spends time with his wife Sarah, while Joe meets and marries singer Pearl O'Neill. At the maritime union hall, the Northern Star survivors await new assignments, which turn out to be to a brand new Liberty ship, the SS Seawitch, commanded by Jarvis, with Rossi once again his First Officer.

The Seawitch, armed with anti-aircraft guns and dual-purpose cannon manned by trained Navy gunnery personnel, embarks with a convoy carrying supplies to the Soviet port of Murmansk. However, the convoy is forced to disperse when attacked by a U-boat wolfpack. The Seawitch takes successful evasive action, hiding out at the edge of the Arctic icepack to elude a U-boat hunting her.

Unable to shake it, she plays cat and mouse, going silent to try to lose her pursuer. After the U-boat breaks off, the Seawitch lights off her boilers and heads for Murmansk. The Luftwaffe is called in to destroy the ship. German maritime patrol planes spot and attack it with bombs and machine guns. In the ensuing action, Captain Jarvis is wounded, and eight members of the crew are killed. First Officer Rossi takes over.

The same U-boat returns to try to sink the Liberty ship. The submarine hits the ship with a torpedo, but Rossi fools its captain by making smoke, setting fires on deck, and ordering an abandon ship signal be sent. This lures the captain into surfacing to finish off the wounded freighter with his deck gun. The Seawitch instead rams and sinks the U-boat.

The Seawitch continues to Murmansk, being saluted by a squadron of Soviet fighters. It is enthusiastically welcomed there by a crowd on the Russian docks, including to the surprise of the Americans, female longshoremen.

The movie concludes with an excerpt from a speech by President Franklin Delano Roosevelt paying tribute to the valor of America's Merchant Mariners and their important contribution to the war effort: "From the freedom-loving peoples of the United Nations to our merchant seaman on all the oceans goes our everlasting gratitude."

== Cast ==
- Humphrey Bogart as First Officer Joe Rossi
- Raymond Massey as Captain Steve Jarvis
- Alan Hale, Sr. as Alfred "Boats" O'Hara
- Julie Bishop as Pearl O'Neill
- Ruth Gordon as Sarah Jarvis
- Sam Levene as Abel "Chips" Abrams
- Dane Clark as Johnnie Pulaski
- Peter Whitney as Whitey Lara
- Dick Hogan as Cadet Ezra Parker
- Kane Richmond as Ensign Wright
- Frederick Giermann as U-boat captain (uncredited)
- President Franklin D. Roosevelt as himself (voice, uncredited)

== Production ==
The working title for the film was Heroes Without Uniforms. It was originally intended to be a two-reel documentary about the Merchant Marine. But as the war went on and more dramatic action footage became available, the project was changed to a feature film with Edward G. Robinson and George Raft cast in the starring roles. When Robinson had to drop out to do Destroyer at Columbia Pictures, he was replaced by Raymond Massey. Similarly, Humphrey Bogart replaced Raft after the latter was assigned by Warner Bros. to Background to Danger.

To add authenticity, the 23-year-old Richard Sullivan, one of two cadet survivors of a recent U-boat attack on a Merchant Marine vessel, was hired as a technical adviser on the film. The screenplay by John Howard Lawson (with additional dialogue by A. I. Bezzerides and W. R. Burnett) was informed by Lawson's discussions with Merchant Marine seamen at the National Maritime Union (NMU) headquarters in San Pedro, California.

Lawson, a future member of the blacklisted "Hollywood Ten", wrote about his clashes with studio executives over certain aspects of the film's political content:

One of the scenes which the Warner Brothers regarded as "controversial" showed the Union Hiring Hall, indicating the service rendered by the union and the pride the men take in their organization. Even the wearing of Union buttons was a matter of concern and some soul-searching by studio officials, who finally agreed that the buttons must be visible. However, the story could not be built around the lives and feelings of the seamen, because it was necessary to give major attention to the parts played by the two leading actors.

Since war restrictions did not permit filming at sea, Action in the North Atlantic was shot entirely on Warner Bros. studio sound stages and back lots. The ships' sets were built in halves on two sound stages, with the burning and sinking of the oil tanker occurring on the studio's "Stage Nine". Aerial sequences were filmed with models of German and Soviet aircraft intermixed with real war combat footage. All dialogue involving non-Americans, notably between German officers, was uttered without subtitles in the speaker's native tongue, a rarity in films of that era.

Director Lloyd Bacon's contract with Warner Bros. expired while production was still in progress. Jack L. Warner wanted to wait until the film was finished before entering discussions about a new contract, but Bacon was not willing to continue without one. Warner fired him and brought in Byron Haskin and Raoul Walsh to complete filming, which ran 45 days over schedule.

In his autobiography, Raymond Massey recounted an anecdote that occurred during the shooting of the film. He and Humphrey Bogart were off-duty and somewhat intoxicated on martinis as they watched their stunt doubles performing dives off a burning ship. The two actors started betting as to which stunt man was braver, and eventually the stars themselves made the dive.

== Reception ==
When Action in the North Atlantic premiered in New York City, more than a dozen Merchant Mariners and several hundred U.S. sailors presented Jack Warner with the Merchant Marine Victory Flag. Henry J. Kaiser, the shipbuilding magnate, thought the film was such a morale booster that he wanted it shown to all his employees.

In The New York Times, Bosley Crowther praised the film as a "tingling, informative picture which thoroughly lives up to its tag of "Action in the North Atlantic' ... some excellent performances help to hold the film together all the way. Raymond Massey and Humphrey Bogart are good and tough as the captain and first mate".

Less than two weeks after the film opened, The Hollywood Reporter said copies of Action in the North Atlantic were being distributed to Merchant Marine schools. The War Shipping Administration decided that technical and educational material in the film would "aid considerably the training program". Warner Bros. donated three prints for official use at the U.S. Merchant Marine Academy in Kings Point, New York, and at cadet basic schools in Pass Christian, Mississippi and San Mateo, California.

=== Box office ===
According to Warner Bros., the film earned $2,144,000 domestically and $1,316,000 abroad.

=== Awards and honors ===
Action in the North Atlantic received an Academy Award nomination for Best Writing (Original Motion Picture Story) for Guy Gilpatric.

=== Controversies ===
Warner Bros. paid compensation to journalist Helen Lawrenson after she alleged that some of the film's dialogue was plagiarized from two of her magazine articles about the Merchant Marine.

Following the film's release, The Pittsburgh Courier reported that Bogart had lobbied unsuccessfully for a black Merchant Marine captain to appear in Action in the North Atlantic. He was quoted as saying, "In the world of the theatre or any other phase of American life, the color of a man's skin should have nothing to do with his rights in a land built upon the self-evident fact that all men are created equal."

The warm portrayal in the film of America's Soviet allies became an awkward reminder during the Cold War, as TCM Programming Director Scott McGee notes:

in the postwar era of chilly American-Russian relations, parts of the film would prove to be an embarrassment to Warner Brothers, namely the climactic "tovarich" (comrade) scene, in which the heroic Bogart and his men are greeted by Russians cheering wildly. Bogart does not return in kind, prompting a crewman to ask why he remains silent. Bogart says, "I'm just thinking about the trip back." That line served a dual purpose. Indeed, the trip back home would be rough going, but it also implied that the comrade stuff is acceptable up to a certain point.

In the ensuing decades, when Action in the North Atlantic was broadcast on American television, Bogart's line was often cut out of the film.

== Radio version ==
In a one-hour Lux Radio Theatre broadcast on May 15, 1944, Raymond Massey and Julie Bishop reprised their roles while George Raft co-starred, replacing Bogart.

== See also ==
- MS Sea Witch
- World War II United States Merchant Navy
