= Clint Madracheluib =

Palauan spearfisher

Personal information
- Nationality: Palau

Sport
- Sport: Spearfishing
- Event(s): Individual, Team
Medal record
Spearfishing
Representing Palau
Micronesian Games
Gold medal – first place	2014 Pohnpei	Individual
Silver medal – second place	2014 Pohnpei	Team

Clint Madracheluib is a Palauan spearfisher.

== Career ==
At the 2014 Micronesian Games, Madracheluib won a gold medal in the individual spearfishing event and a silver medal as part of the team event.

At the Palau Sports Fishing Association (PSFA)'s annual Evolution Tournament in November 2023, he captained team Omenged to second place at the Wahoo Classic. The following year, he led team Omenged to victory at the PSFA's Tekoi ‘L Beluu Fishing Derby, in honor of Senator Regis Akitaya, after they caught a yellowfin tuna.
