= 2024 Micronesian Games =

International sporting event

X Micronesian Games
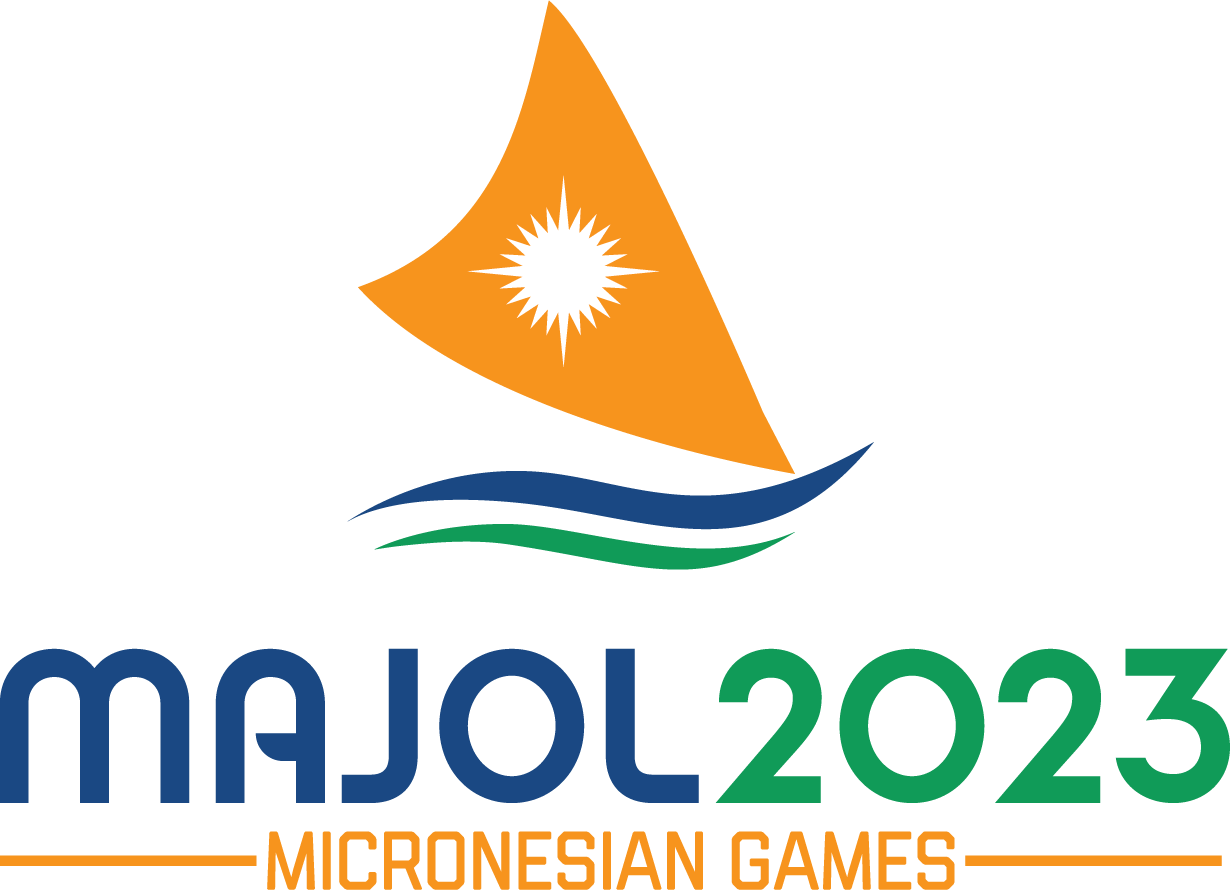
- Host city: Majuro
- Country: Marshall Islands
- Nations: 10
- Events: 14 sports
- Opening: June 15, 2024
- Closing: June 24, 2024
- Website: Official website Results website

The 10th Micronesian Games were held in Majuro, Marshall Islands. After initially being scheduled for July 25 to August 5, 2022, the competition was originally delayed a year because of challenges posed by the COVID-19 pandemic, including finishing construction of the new Marshall Islands stadium. The games were held June 15-24, 2024.

== History ==
The Marshall Islands were announced as tournament hosts in July 2018. This marked the first time that the Marshall Islands hosted the Micronesian Games. The Marshall Islands received unanimous support after the Northern Mariana Islands withdrew their bid to host.

The Marshall Islands Soccer Federation had indicated that the nation may field its first-ever national soccer team at the games. However, in March 2023 MISF President Shev Livai stated that football would not be part of the tournament. The federation investigated the possibility of adding football to the schedule but hotels on the islands were already fully booked.

In March 2023 it was announced that the tournament would again be delayed for an indefinite amount of time. The delay was necessary because of the construction progress of the stadium and sports arena. Progress was slowed by supply chain and worker shortages caused by the COVID-19 pandemic, the Russian invasion of Ukraine, and Asia Pacific Airlines, the sole cargo carrier for the Marshall Islands, being grounded by the US Federal Aviation Administration since 1 February 2023. A Radio New Zealand contributor indicated that the tournament may now be held in April 2024. In May 2023 it was announced that the tournament dates had been officially set for 15-24 June 2024.

== Sports ==
Athletes competed in 14 different sports at the games:

2024 Micronesian Games Sports Programme
- Athletics
- Basketball
  - Basketball
  - Basketball 3x3
- Fastpitch softball
- Lawn tennis
- Micronesian all around
- Spearfishing
- Swimming
- open-water swimming
- Table tennis
- Va'a
- Volleyball
  - Beach volleyball
  - Volleyball
- weightlifting
- Wrestling

== Results ==
The Commonwealth of the Northern Mariana Islands (CNMI) topped the medal tally with 70 golds, followed by Nauru on 68. Host nation the Marshall Islands won gold in the women's volleyball and finished with the highest number of overall medals, with 47 golds and 134 medals overall.

== Medallists ==
=== Athletics ===
==== Men's events ====
Event	Gold	Silver	Bronze
100 meters	Winzar Kakiouea; Nauru	Tetoa Uaraoia; Kiribati	Koyven Emery; Palau
200 meters	Winzar Kakiouea; Nauru	William Reed; Marshall Islands	Ty'ree Langidrik; Marshall Islands
400 meters	Tetoa Uaraoia; Kiribati	Quijuan Armisais; Pohnpei	Jeofry Limtiaco; Guam
800 meters	Emmanuel Adaba; Palau	Righteous Adaba; Palau	Hardney Amusten; Pohnpei
1500 meters	Simeon Jacob; Pohnpei	Peace Adaba; Palau	Kraven Ngirchomlei; Palau
5000 meters run	Simeon Jacob; Pohnpei	Issac Oppenheimmer; Nauru	Peace Adaba; Palau
10,000 meters	Simeon Jacob; Pohnpei	Issac Oppenheimmer; Nauru	Kraven Ngirchomlei; Palau
110 meters hurdles	Jovan Pineda; Guam	Simon Daniel Tang; Northern Mariana Islands	Justin Vaughn Rabwul Cam; Northern Mariana Islands
400 meters hurdles	Jeofry Limtiaco; Guam	Cody Soriano Shimizu; Northern Mariana Islands	Renaldo Abraham; Pohnpei
High jump	William Reed; Marshall Islands	Andrew Westin; Palau	Emmanuel Adaba; Palau
Long jump	William Reed; Marshall Islands	Cy Emerick Daoe; Nauru	Jovan Pineda; Guam
Triple jump	Jovan Pineda; Guam	Righteous Adaba; Palau	Tyson Chinn; Palau
Shot put	Jonathan-Deiwea Detageouwa; Nauru	Jose Uepa; Nauru	Iowane Watisoni Wainimal; Marshall Islands
Discus throw	Bouncer Quadina; Nauru	Jonathan-Deiwea Detageouwa; Nauru	Lyle Andrew; Northern Mariana Islands
Hammer throw	Lyle Andrew; Northern Mariana Islands	Jonathan-Deiwea Detageouwa; Nauru	Daniel Joab; Northern Mariana Islands
Javelin throw	Bouncer Quadina; Nauru	Jerry Ngiraremiang; Palau	Rodman Etse; Pohnpei
4×100 metres relay	Nauru; Koutua Kepae; Fadandus Ika; Joshua Jeremiah; Winzar Kakiouea	Chuuk; Vince Victus; Jonathon Hallers; Deisfil Asito; Jarret Robert	Pohnpei; Stanislaus Kostka; Jeffrin Saul; Robinson Silbanuz Jr. Dennis Petrus
4×400 metres relay	Pohnpei; Jeffrin Saul; Hardney Amusten; Stanislaus Kostka; Quijuan Armisais	Chuuk; Myca Nittu; Klover Fermin; Rikay Ichiro; Jarret Robert	Palau; Emmanuel Adaba; Righteous Adaba; Ali Kwak; Tyson Chinn

==== Women's events ====
Event	Gold	Silver	Bronze
100 meters	Regine Tugade-Watson; Guam	Olivia Altomese Reed; Marshall Islands	Aleah-Rae Castro; Guam
200 meters	Regine Tugade-Watson; Guam	Olivia Altomese Reed; Marshall Islands	Aleah-Rae Castro; Guam
400 meters	Aleah-Rae Castro; Guam	Taylor-Ann Santos; Guam	Josephine Bartolome; Pohnpei
800 meters	Ava Planz; Palau	Bartola Bartolome; Pohnpei	Anjali Adumur; Nauru
1500 meters	Nathania Tan; Northern Mariana Islands	Keira Paz; Guam	Ava Planz; Palau
5000 meters	Nathania Tan; Northern Mariana Islands	Keira Paz; Guam	Ava Planz; Palau
10,000 meters	Nathania Tan; Northern Mariana Islands	Keira Paz; Guam	—N/a
100 meters hurdles	Mary Devivo; Palau	Aleah-Rae Castro; Guam	Maria Igitol; Northern Mariana Islands
400 meters hurdles	Mary Devivo; Palau	Aleah-Rae Castro; Guam	Brinnette Likor; Pohnpei
High jump	Olivia Altomese Reed; Marshall Islands	Regine Tugade-Watson; Guam	Sydney Francisco; Palau
Long jump	Olivia Altomese Reed; Marshall Islands	Wena Gobure; Nauru	Regine Tugade-Watson; Guam
Triple jump	Regine Tugade-Watson; Guam	Taylor-Ann Santos; Guam	Maria Maelaine Igito Quitugua; Northern Mariana Islands
Shot put	Mia Pulianas; Marshall Islands	Kimeata Rakenang; Kiribati	Sidra Triplett; Marshall Islands
Discus throw	Mia Pulianas; Marshall Islands	Sidra Triplett; Marshall Islands	Jaya-Shalimar Teboua; Nauru
Hammer throw	Mia Pulianas; Marshall Islands	Jaya-Shalimar Teboua; Nauru	Li'amwar Elloise Pua Rangamar; Northern Mariana Islands
Javelin throw	Maria Igitol; Northern Mariana Islands	Kayla Kanemoto; Chuuk	Juneen Peniteti; Nauru
4×100 metres relay	Nauru; Ruana Reweru; Emerald Capelle; Eldina Detenamo; Wena Gobure	Palau; Uilau Tarkong; Sydney Francisco; Mary Devivo; Ava Planz	Guam; Taylor-Ann Santos; Regine Tugade-Watson; Aleah-Rae Castro; Keira Paz
4×400 metres relay	Palau; Sydney Francisco; Ava Planz; Namiko Singich; Mary Devivo	Pohnpei; Christina Lighor; Bartola Bartolome; Brinnette Likor; Josephine Bartolome	Kiribati; Aribeta Birita; Waymar Bwereeti; Erenoo Tebukaa; Tuata Tatoa

==== Mixed event ====
Event	Gold	Silver	Bronze
4×400 metres relay	Guam; Jovan Pineda; Regine Tugade-Watson; Jeofry Limtiaco; Aleah-Rae Castro	Palau; Ignacio Blaluk; Ava Planz; Ali Kwak; Mary Devivo	Nauru; Joshua Jeremiah; Eldina Detenamo; Winzar Kakiouea; Wena Gobure

=== Basketball ===
Event	Gold	Silver	Bronze
Men	Guam	Pohnpei	Marshall Islands
Women	Guam	Northern Mariana Islands	

=== Basketball 3x3 ===
Event	Gold	Silver	Bronze
Men	Guam	Palau	Nauru
Women	Guam	Nauru	Marshall Islands

=== Fastpitch softball ===
Event	Gold	Silver	Bronze
Women			Northern Mariana Islands

=== Lawn tennis ===
Event	Gold	Silver	Bronze

=== Micronesian all-around ===
Event	Gold	Silver	Bronze

=== Spearfishing ===
Event	Gold	Silver	Bronze
Individual	Michael Genereux; Guam	Palau	Nauru
Team	Guam; Michael Genereux; Ray Flores; Barnaby Acfalle; Tony Borja	Nauru	Palau

=== Swimming ===
==== Men's events ====
Event	Gold	Silver	Bronze
50 yard freestyle	Isaiah Aleksenko; Northern Mariana Islands	Kazuumi Nestor; Palau	Katerson Moya; Pohnpei
100 yard freestyle	Isaiah Aleksenko; Northern Mariana Islands	Katerson Moya; Pohnpei	Travis Sakurai; Palau
200 yard freestyle	Kean Pajarillaga; Northern Mariana Islands	Kyler Kihleng; Pohnpei	Travis Sakurai; Palau
500 yard freestyle	Kean Pajarillaga; Northern Mariana Islands	Kyler Kihleng; Pohnpei	Justin Ma; Northern Mariana Islands
800 yard freestyle	Kean Pajarillaga; Northern Mariana Islands	Kyler Kihleng; Pohnpei	Justin Ma; Northern Mariana Islands
1650 yard freestyle	Kean Pajarillaga; Northern Mariana Islands	Kyler Kihleng; Pohnpei	Justin Ma; Northern Mariana Islands
50 yard backstroke	Kazuumi Nestor; Palau	Kean Pajarillaga; Northern Mariana Islands	Katerson Moya; Pohnpei
100 yard backstroke	Kean Pajarillaga; Northern Mariana Islands	Kazuumi Nestor; Palau	Justin Ma; Northern Mariana Islands
200 yard backstroke	Kean Pajarillaga; Northern Mariana Islands	Kazuumi Nestor; Palau	Justin Ma; Northern Mariana Islands
50 yard breaststroke	Kouki Watanabe; Northern Mariana Islands	Jion Hosei; Palau	Travis Sakurai; Palau
100 yard breaststroke	Kouki Watanabe; Northern Mariana Islands	Jion Hosei; Palau	Kyler Kihleng; Pohnpei
200 yard breaststroke	Kouki Watanabe; Northern Mariana Islands	Jion Hosei; Palau	Kyler Kihleng; Pohnpei
50 yard butterfly	Isaiah Aleksenko; Northern Mariana Islands	Jion Hosei; Palau	Travis Sakurai; Palau
100 yard butterfly	Isaiah Aleksenko; Northern Mariana Islands	Katerson Moya; Pohnpei	Kouki Watanabe; Northern Mariana Islands
200 yard butterfly	Isaiah Aleksenko; Northern Mariana Islands	Kouki Watanabe; Northern Mariana Islands	Kazuumi Nestor; Palau
100 yard individual medley	Isaiah Aleksenko; Northern Mariana Islands	Kazuumi Nestor; Palau	Katerson Moya; Pohnpei
200 yard individual medley	Isaiah Aleksenko; Northern Mariana Islands	Kouki Watanabe; Northern Mariana Islands	Justin Pace; Marshall Islands
400 yard individual medley	Isaiah Aleksenko; Northern Mariana Islands	Kouki Watanabe; Northern Mariana Islands	Kyler Kihleng; Pohnpei
200 yard medley relay	Northern Mariana Islands; Kean Pajarillaga; Kouki Watanabe; Isaiah Aleksenko; Michael Miller	Palau; Kazuumi Nestor; Jion Hosei; Charlie Gibbons; Travis Sakurai	Pohnpei; Christopher Eperiam; Kyler Kihleng; Katerson Moya; Elijah Eperiam
400 yard medley relay	Northern Mariana Islands; Kean Pajarillaga; Kouki Watanabe; Isaiah Aleksenko; Michael Miller	Palau; Kazuumi Nestor; Jion Hosei; Travis Sakurai; Charlie Gibbons	Pohnpei; Katerson Moya; Kyler Kihleng; Elijah Eperiam; Carson Amor
200 yard freestyle relay	Northern Mariana Islands; Kean Pajarillaga; Michael Miller; Kouki Watanabe; Isaiah Aleksenko	Palau; Jion Hosei; Travis Sakurai; Charlie Gibbons; Kazuumi Nestor	Marshall Islands; Matai McCollum; Justin Pace; Jaya Corder; Phillip Kinono
400 yard freestyle relay	Northern Mariana Islands; Michael Miller; Kean Pajarillaga; Kouki Watanabe; Isaiah Aleksenko	Palau; Jion Hosei; Kazuumi Nestor; Charlie Gibbons; Travis Sakurai	Pohnpei; Katerson Moya; Carson Amor; Elijah Eperiam; Kyler Kihleng
800 yard freestyle relay	Northern Mariana Islands; Kean Pajarillaga; Justin Ma; Kouki Watanabe; Isaiah Aleksenko	Palau; Jion Hosei; Travis Sakurai; Kazuumi Nestor; Charlie Gibbons	Marshall Islands; Matai McCollum; Jaya Corder; Justin Pace; Phillip Kinono

==== Women's events ====
Event	Gold	Silver	Bronze
50 yard freestyle	Ann-Marie Hepler; Marshall Islands	Maria Batallones; Northern Mariana Islands	Dirngulbai Misech; Palau
100 yard freestyle	Maria Batallones; Northern Mariana Islands	Ann-Marie Hepler; Marshall Islands	Dirngulbai Misech; Palau
200 yard freestyle	Maria Batallones; Northern Mariana Islands	Dirngulbai Misech; Palau	Frances Raho; Northern Mariana Islands
500 yard freestyle	Frances Raho; Northern Mariana Islands	Galyah Mikel; Palau	Sari Barman; Northern Mariana Islands
800 yard freestyle	Frances Raho; Northern Mariana Islands	Galyah Mikel; Palau	Sari Barman; Northern Mariana Islands
1650 yard freestyle	Maria Batallones; Northern Mariana Islands	Frances Raho; Northern Mariana Islands	Galyah Mikel; Palau
50 yard backstroke	Frances Raho; Northern Mariana Islands	Shoko Litulumar; Northern Mariana Islands	Kayla Hepler; Marshall Islands
100 yard backstroke	Shoko Litulumar; Northern Mariana Islands	Frances Raho; Northern Mariana Islands	Kayla Hepler; Marshall Islands
200 yard backstroke	Frances Raho; Northern Mariana Islands	Shoko Litulumar; Northern Mariana Islands	Kayla Hepler; Marshall Islands
50 yard breaststroke	Maria Batallones; Northern Mariana Islands	Katrianne Kihleng; Pohnpei	Hanna Ruluked; Palau
100 yard breaststroke	Maria Batallones; Northern Mariana Islands	Hanna Ruluked; Palau	Katrianne Kihleng; Pohnpei
200 yard breaststroke	Maria Batallones; Northern Mariana Islands	Shoko Litulumar; Northern Mariana Islands	Katrianne Kihleng; Pohnpei
50 yard butterfly	Ann-Marie Hepler; Marshall Islands	Maria Batallones; Northern Mariana Islands	Dirngulbai Misech; Palau
100 yard butterfly	Dirngulbai Misech; Palau	Maria Batallones; Northern Mariana Islands	Ann-Marie Hepler; Marshall Islands
200 yard butterfly	Dirngulbai Misech; Palau	Shoko Litulumar; Northern Mariana Islands	Maria Guerrero; Northern Mariana Islands
100 yard individual medley	Maria Batallones; Northern Mariana Islands	Dirngulbai Misech; Palau	Ann-Marie Hepler; Marshall Islands
200 yard individual medley	Shoko Litulumar; Northern Mariana Islands	Emi Yonezawa; Palau	Maria Guerrero; Northern Mariana Islands
400 yard individual medley	Maria Batallones; Northern Mariana Islands	Shoko Litulumar; Northern Mariana Islands	Emi Yonezawa; Palau
200 yard medley relay	Northern Mariana Islands; Frances Raho; Maria Batallones; Sari Barman; Shoko Litulumar	Marshall Islands; Kayla Hepler; Maliana McCollum; Ann-Marie Hepler; Leightyn Cossey	Pohnpei; Kaylinn Kihleng; Katrianne Kihleng; Keysha Saimon; Melinda Moya
400 yard medley relay	Northern Mariana Islands; Frances Raho; Maria Batallones; Maria Guerrero; Shoko Litulumar	Palau; Abigail Krake; Hanna Ruluked; Dirngulbai Misech; Emi Yonezawa	Marshall Islands; Kayla Hepler; Maliana McCollum; Ann-Marie Hepler; Tessa Delisio
200 yard freestyle relay	Northern Mariana Islands; Frances Raho; Shoko Litulumar; Maria Guerrero; Maria Batallones	Marshall Islands; Leightyn Cossey; Maliana McCollum; Kayla Hepler; Ann-Marie Hepler	Palau; Galyah Mikel; Emi Yonezawa; Hanna Ruluked; Dirngulbai Misech
400 yard freestyle relay	Northern Mariana Islands; Maria Guerrero; Shoko Litulumar; Frances Raho; Maria Batallones	Marshall Islands; Kayla Hepler; Maliana McCollum; Leightyn Cossey; Ann-Marie Hepler	Palau; Emi Yonezawa; Galyah Mikel; Abigail Krake; Dirngulbai Misech
800 yard freestyle relay	Northern Mariana Islands; Shoko Litulumar; Sari Barman; Frances Raho; Maria Batallones	Palau; Abigail Krake; Galyah Mikel; Emi Yonezawa; Dirngulbai Misech	Marshall Islands; Tessa Delisio; Maliana McCollum; Kayla Hepler; Leightyn Cossey

==== Mixed events ====
Event	Gold	Silver	Bronze
200 yard freestyle relay	Northern Mariana Islands; Isaiah Aleksenko; Kean Pajarillaga; Maria Guerrero; Shoko Litulumar	Palau; Kazuumi Nestor; Jion Hosei; Dirngulbai Misech; Emi Yonezawa	Marshall Islands; Matai McCollum; Phillip Kinono; Kayla Hepler; Ann-Marie Hepler
400 yard freestyle relay	Northern Mariana Islands; Maria Batallones; Kean Pajarillaga; Frances Raho; Isaiah Aleksenko	Pohnpei; Kyler Kihleng; Katerson Moya; Kaylinn Kihleng; Katrianne Kihleng	Palau; Galyah Mikel; Erungel Maruyama Williams; Emi Yonezawa; Momota Oiterong
200 yard medley relay	Northern Mariana Islands; Kean Pajarillaga; Maria Batallones; Isaiah Aleksenko; Frances Raho	Marshall Islands; Kayla Hepler; Justin Pace; Ann-Marie Hepler; Matai McCollum	Pohnpei; Katerson Moya; Kyler Kihleng; Katrianne Kihleng; Kaylinn Kihleng
400 yard medley relay	Northern Mariana Islands; Maria Batallones; Kouki Watanabe; Isaiah Aleksenko; Frances Raho	Palau; Kazuumi Nestor; Jion Hosei; Dirngulbai Misech; Abigail Krake	Pohnpei; Katerson Moya; Katrianne Kihleng; Kyler Kihleng; Kaylinn Kihleng

=== Open-water swimming ===
Event	Gold	Silver	Bronze
Men 2.5k	Isaiah Aleksenko; Northern Mariana Islands	Kazuumi Nestor; Palau	Richard Zhao; Northern Mariana Islands
Men 5k	Kean Pajarillaga; Northern Mariana Islands	Kyler Kihleng; Pohnpei	Katerson Moya; Pohnpei
Women 2.5k	Dirngulbai Misech; Palau	Shoko Litulumar; Northern Mariana Islands	Frances Raho; Northern Mariana Islands
Women 5k	Maria Batallones; Northern Mariana Islands	Galyah Mikel; Palau	Sari Barman; Northern Mariana Islands

=== Table tennis ===
Event	Gold	Silver	Bronze
Men's team		Guam; Emil Christian Penafiel; Aarman Sachdev; Aidan Schembari	

=== Volleyball ===
==== Beach volleyball ====
Event	Gold	Silver	Bronze
Men	Palau	Kiribati	Northern Mariana Islands; Dylan Mister; Jermaine Salas
Women	Palau	Guam; Kendra Byrd; Lori Okada	Northern Mariana Islands; Aurora Santos; Kathy Winkfield

==== Indoor Volleyball ====
Event	Gold	Silver	Bronze
Men	Pohnpei	Palau	Kiribati
Women	Marshall Islands	Palau	

=== Weightlifting ===
==== Men's events ====
Event		Gold	Silver	Bronze
55kg	Snatch			
55kg	Clean & Jerk			
55kg	Total			

==== Women's events ====
Event		Gold	Silver	Bronze
63kg	Snatch	Mattie Sasser Miller; Marshall Islands		
63kg	Clean & Jerk	Mattie Sasser Miller; Marshall Islands		
63kg	Total	Mattie Sasser Miller; Marshall Islands		
71kg	Snatch			Takeeniti Atantaake; Marshall Islands
71kg	Clean & Jerk			Takeeniti Atantaake; Marshall Islands
71kg	Total			Takeeniti Atantaake; Marshall Islands

=== Wrestling ===
==== Men's events ====
Event	Gold	Silver	Bronze
Freestyle; 57kg	Atnel Pero; Marshall Islands	Yestin Uehara Narruhn; Chuuk	John Joey J Robert; Chuuk
Freestyle; 61kg	Kiaben Ronan Kennedy; Marshall Islands	Hayden Quinn Narruhn; Chuuk	Kelsy Predrick; Pohnpei
Freestyle; 65kg	Ishmael Bunglick; Marshall Islands	Lowe Bingham; Nauru	Omar Narruhn; Chuuk
Freestyle; 70kg	Cristian Nicolescu; Palau	Isamaela Solomon; Nauru	Ohsama Ioanis; Pohnpei
Freestyle; 74kg	Risky Predrick; Pohnpei	Kakaiga Munauke; Nauru	Bercil C Timothy; Kosrae
Freestyle; 79kg	James Attao-Greene Jr. Northern Mariana Islands	J.R. Bremen Leban; Marshall Islands	Sebastian John Peralta; Marshall Islands
Freestyle; 86kg	Ricktack Israel Iban Jr. Marshall Islands	Deamo Baguga; Nauru	Jeremy Konrat; Pohnpei
Freestyle; 92kg	Benedict Kintaro; Palau	Kevin Leon; Pohnpei	John E. Tulensru; Kosrae
Freestyle; 97kg	Ryan Justice Tochi Babauta; Northern Mariana Islands	Skarlee Renguul; Palau	Kenfield K Mike; Kosrae
Freestyle; 125kg	Ryan Ifamilik; Pohnpei	Ring Clarence; Marshall Islands	—N/a
Beach wrestling 70kg	Isamaela Solomon; Nauru	Lowe Bingham; Nauru	Cristian Nicolescu; Palau
Beach wrestling 80kg	James Attao-Greene Jr. Northern Mariana Islands	Hamray Temaki; Nauru	Sebastian John Peralta; Marshall Islands
Beach wrestling 90kg	Deamo Baguga; Nauru	Ricktack Israel Iban Jr. Marshall Islands	Jeremy Konrat; Pohnpei
Beach wrestling +90kg	Ryan Justice Tochi Babauta; Northern Mariana Islands	Skarlee Renguul; Palau	Ryan Ifamilik; Pohnpei
Greco-Roman; 55kg	Charles Kyle Facer; Marshall Islands	John Joey J Robert; Chuuk	Alexander Adiniwin; Marshall Islands
Greco-Roman; 60kg	Damien Damian; Pohnpei	Germaine Waylon Jr. A. Muller; Marshall Islands	Ray Joy Robert; Chuuk
Greco-Roman; 63kg	Mark Nittu; Chuuk	GJ Damian; Pohnpei	—N/a
Greco-Roman; 67kg	Lowe Bingham; Nauru	Andrew Jr. Mwaitog; Yap	PH Robert Walter; Chuuk
Greco-Roman; 72kg	Isamaela Solomon; Nauru	Cristian Nicolescu; Palau	Hamray Temaki; Nauru
Greco-Roman; 77kg	James Brian Attao Greene Jr. Northern Mariana Islands	Jeton Anjain; Marshall Islands	Paulus Barnabas; Pohnpei
Greco-Roman; 82kg	J.R. Bremen Leban; Marshall Islands	O'Brian Yaromal; Yap	Flady Nittu; Chuuk
Greco-Roman; 87kg	Ricktack Israel Iban Jr. Marshall Islands	Deamo Baguga; Nauru	Kevin Leon; Pohnpei
Greco-Roman; 97kg	Ryan Justice Tochi Babauta; Northern Mariana Islands	Kenfield K Mike; Kosrae	Ken Predrick; Pohnpei
Greco-Roman; 130kg	Ryan Ifamilik; Pohnpei	Dan-Hero Olsson; Nauru	Skarlee Renguul; Palau

==== Women's events ====
Event	Gold	Silver	Bronze
Beach Wrestling +70kg	Takeniti Atanaake; Marshall Islands	Merean Atanaake; Marshall Islands	—N/a
53kg	Capella Takira Lajuan; Marshall Islands	—N/a	—N/a
55kg	Berthania Sione; Pohnpei	—N/a	—N/a
59kg	Kalani J. Horiuchi; Marshall Islands	—N/a	—N/a
65kg	Katewea Rewin Ioane; Marshall Islands	—N/a	—N/a
72kg	Uilau Tarkong; Palau	Takeniti Atanaake; Marshall Islands	—N/a
76kg	Merean Atanaake; Marshall Islands	—N/a	—N/a

== Medals ==
* Host nation (Marshall Islands)

Rank	Nation	Gold	Silver	Bronze	Total
1	Northern Mariana Islands	70	23	29	122
2	Nauru	68	38	8	114
3	Marshall Islands*	47	41	46	134
4	Palau	18	60	38	116
5	(Pohnpei State) Pohnpei	17	27	40	84
6	Guam	14	10	8	32
7	Kiribati	3	6	10	19
8	(Chuuk State) Chuuk	2	12	12	26
9	(Yap State) Yap	0	4	2	6
10	Kosrae	0	2	14	16
Totals (10 entries)		239	223	207	669
