= Ray Flores =

Guamanian spearfisher and swimmer

Personal information
- Full name: Raymond Joseph Flores
- Born: 15 January 1974 (age 52)

Sport
- Sport: Spearfishing, Swimming
- Event(s): Individual, Team
Medal record
Spearfishing
Representing Guam
Micronesian Games
Gold medal – first place	2018 Yap	Team
Gold medal – first place	2024 Majuro	Team
Silver medal – second place	2014 Pohnpei	Individual

Raymond Joseph Flores (born 15 January 1974) is a Guamanian spearfisher and former butterfly and freestyle swimmer.

== Career ==
He competed in three swimming events at the 1992 Summer Olympics. At the 2014 Micronesian Games, he won a silver medal in the individual spearfishing event. At the consecutive Micronesian Games of 2018 and 2024, he won two gold medals in the team spearfishing events.
