= Kayla Hepler =

Marshallese swimmer (born 2002)

Personal information
- Nationality: Marshall Islands
- Born: 22 March 2002 (age 24)

Sport
- Sport: Swimming
- College team: Nebraska Wesleyan University

Kayla Hepler (born 22 March 2002) is a swimmer who represents the Marshall Islands. She was selected for the 2024 Paris Olympics.

== Early life ==
Hepler was born on Ebeye Island in Kwajalein Atoll. Coached by her mother Amy LaCost, she began swimming at a very early age. An avid scuba diver from the age of 10, Hepler is a graduate of Kwajalein Jr-Sr High School. She worked as a lifeguard and assistant sports coach on Kwajalein. She attended Nebraska Wesleyan University.

== Career ==
She represented the Marshall Islands at the 2018 Youth Olympics in Buenos Aires.

She represented the Marshall Islands at the 2021 FINA World Swimming Championships in Abu Dhabi, where she set personal bests in both the 50m butterfly and 50m freestyle.

She was selected to compete at the 2024 Paris Olympics in the 50m freestyle.
