= 2014 Micronesian Games =

Multi-sport competition

VIII Micronesian Games
- Host city: Pohnpei
- Country: Federated States of Micronesia
- Nations: 10
- Events: 14 sports
- Opening: July 20, 2014
- Closing: July 30, 2014

The 8th Micronesian Games were held from July 20 to July 30, 2014, in Pohnpei, Federated States of Micronesia (FSM).

The Games began with an opening ceremony on the track and field grounds. They included "traditional war dances", and the unfurling of the Games flag in the air as it was delivered by parachute.

At the closing of the Games, Guam had topped the medal table with eighty-one medals, of which forty-two were gold.

== Participating countries ==
All Micronesian nations, states and territories participated in the Games. The host country was represented by four teams, one for each of its federated states: Chuuk, Kosrae, Pohnpei and Yap. The other participants included four independent countries (Kiribati, the Marshall Islands, Nauru, Palau) and two unincorporated organised territories of the United States: the Northern Mariana Islands and Guam. The 2014 Games were the second hosted by the FSM, the 2002 Games having also taken place in Pohnpei State.

The scheduling of the Games conflicted with the 2014 Commonwealth Games in Glasgow, which began on 23 July. Two Micronesian countries, Kiribati and Nauru, are members of the Commonwealth of Nations, and thus had to split their athletes between the two events, both of which they were participating in. (See Kiribati at the 2014 Commonwealth Games and Nauru at the 2014 Commonwealth Games.)

== Sports ==
Participants competed in fourteen sports, reportedly a record. The tournament included football, which had also been played in the 1998 edition, with the explicit aim for some of the teams to improve their credentials and gain associate member status with FIFA. At the time of the Games, the only Micronesian country or territory to be a member of FIFA was Guam.

The sports were: athletics, baseball, basketball, football, the "Micronesian all-around", softball, spearfishing, swimming, volleyball, table tennis, tennis, va'a (canoeing), weightlifting, and wrestling.

For results by sport, see:

- Athletics at the 2014 Micronesian Games

=== Spearfishing ===
Event	Gold	Silver	Bronze
Individual	Clint Madracheluib; Palau	Ray Flores; Guam	Moy Shmull; Palau
Team	Guam; James Borja; Mike Cassidy	Palau; Clint Madracheluib; Moy Shmull	Pohnpei; Charles Tom; Taylor Paul

== Medal table ==
The final medal table was as follows. Only Kiribati failed to obtain any medals.

Rank	Nation	Gold	Silver	Bronze	Total
1	Guam	42	27	12	81
2	(Pohnpei State) Pohnpei	36	41	37	114
3	Palau	36	31	38	105
4	Marshall Islands	34	23	33	90
5	(Yap State) Yap	17	23	15	55
6	Northern Mariana Islands	14	15	5	34
7	Kosrae	4	3	11	18
8	Nauru	3	9	5	17
9	(Chuuk State) Chuuk	3	4	9	16
Totals (9 entries)		189	176	165	530
