= 2006 Micronesian Games =

VI Micronesian Games
- Host city: Saipan
- Country: Northern Mariana Islands
- Nations: 9
- Events: 15 sports
- Opening: June 23, 2006
- Closing: July 2, 2006
- Opened by: Benigno R. Fitial
- Torch lighter: Xenavee Torwal
- Main venue: Oleai Sports Complex

The 6th Micronesian Games were held on Saipan, Northern Mariana Islands from June 23-July 2, 2006. The Games featured competition in 15 different sports/disciplines.

In February 2006, the Games were canceled by the Governor of the Northern Marianas, Benigno R. Fitial, due to a financial crisis and a lack of planning. However, after pleas from athletes, coaches and parents, and the creation of a financial plan, the Games were allowed to go on.

On June 23, 2006, the games were officially opened by the Governor of the Northern Mariana Islands, Benigno R. Fitial. The torch lighter was swimmer Xenavee Torwal.

== Participating countries ==
- Chuuk
- Guam
- Kiribati
- Kosrae
- Marshall Islands
- Northern Mariana Islands
- Palau
- Pohnpei
- Yap

== Sports ==
Slow Pitch Softball was withdrawn.

- Athletics
- Baseball
- Basketball
- Beach Volleyball
- Fast Pitch Softball
- Golf
- Micro All Around
- Spearfishing
- Swimming
- Table Tennis
- Tennis
- Triathlon
- Va'a Canoe
- Volleyball
- Wrestling

=== Spearfishing ===
Event	Gold	Silver	Bronze
Individual	Felix Sasamoto; Northern Mariana Islands	Michael Genereux; Guam	Iony Hadley; Pohnpei
Team	Northern Mariana Islands; Mark Hapdai; Frank Pangelinan; Felix Sasamoto	Guam; James Borja; Michael Genereux; Myles Driscoll	Pohnpei; Lenson Nikolas; Iony Hadley

== Overall medal standings ==
Rank	Nation	Gold	Silver	Bronze	Total
1	Guam	51	27	18	96
2	Northern Mariana Islands	34	33	31	98
3	Palau	27	16	21	64
4	Chuuk	6	10	12	28
5	Pohnpei	5	15	17	37
6	Kiribati	5	7	5	17
7	Marshall Islands	3	5	12	20
8	Kosrae	3	3	2	8
9	Yap	2	7	3	12
Totals (9 entries)		136	123	121	380
