= Gérard Ségura =

French spearfisher

Personal information
- Nationality: France

Sport
- Sport: Spearfishing
- Event(s): Individual, Team
Medal record
Spearfishing
Representing France
Euro-African Spearfishing Championship
Gold medal – first place	1997 Marseille	Individual
Gold medal – first place	1997 Marseille	Team

Gérard Ségura is a French spearfisher.

== Career ==
Ségura won gold at the 1997 Euro-African Spearfishing Championship in Marseille in the individual event and as part of the team event.
