= Spearfishing =

Hunting for fish using a spear

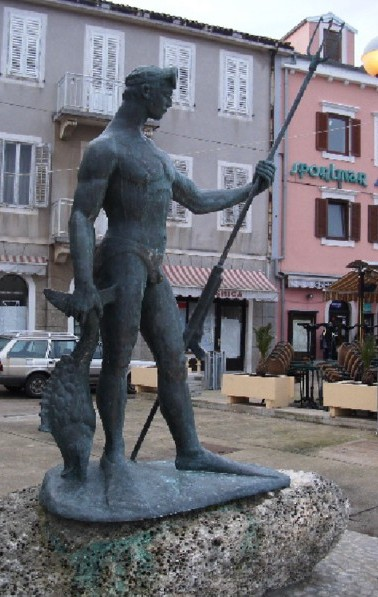
Spearfisher Monument in Croatia

Spearfishing is the practice of fishing using handheld, sharp-pointed elongated tools such as spears, gigs, harpoons and tridents. It was one of the earliest fishing techniques used by mankind, and has been deployed in artisanal fishing throughout the world for millennia. Early hunter-gatherer societies were familiar with the custom of spearing fish from rivers and streams using sharpened sticks. Modern spearfishing usually involves the use of underwater swimming gear and slingshot-like elastic or compressed gas-powered pneumatic spearguns, which shoot out a tethered dart-like projectile to strike fish and other aquatic animals such as squids and lobster. Over the years, specialized techniques and equipment have been developed for various types of aquatic environments and target fish. Spearfishing uses no bait and is highly selective, with no bycatch, but inflicts lethal injury to the target animal and thus precludes catch and release.

Spearfishing may be done using free-diving, snorkelling, or scuba diving techniques, but spearfishing while using scuba equipment is illegal in some countries. The use of mechanically powered spearguns is also outlawed in some countries and jurisdictions such as New Zealand.

== History ==
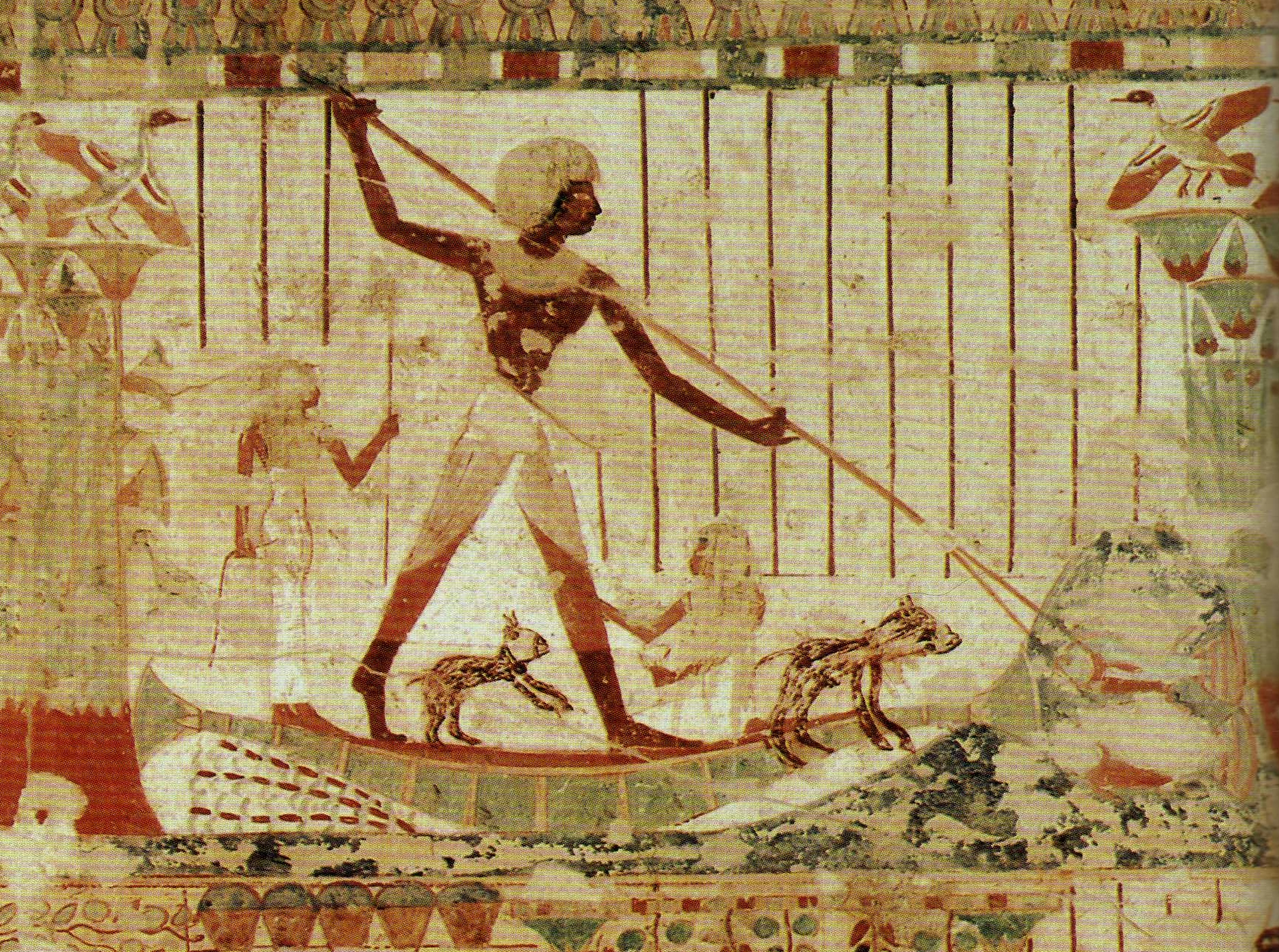
Fisherman with a spear in a wall painting from the tomb of Usheret in Thebes, around 1430 BC

Spearfishing with barbed poles (harpoons) was widespread in palaeolithic times. There are references to fishing with spears in ancient literature; though, in most cases, the descriptions do not go into detail. An early example from the Bible is in Job 41:7: Canst thou fill his [Leviathan] skin with barbed irons? or his head with fish spears?.

The Greek historian Polybius (ca 203 BC–120 BC), in his Histories, describes hunting for swordfish by using a harpoon with a barbed and detachable head. Greek author Oppian of Corycus wrote a major treatise on sea fishing, the Halieulica or Halieutika, composed between 177 and 180. This is the earliest such work to have survived intact. Oppian describes various means of fishing including the use of spears and tridents.

In a parody of fishing, a type of gladiator called retiarius carried a trident and a casting-net. He fought the murmillo, who carried a short sword and a helmet with the image of a fish on the front. Copper harpoons were known to the seafaring Harappans well into antiquity. Early hunters in India include the Andamanese peoples, aboriginal inhabitants of India's Andaman and Nicobar islands, who have used harpoons with long cords for fishing since early times.

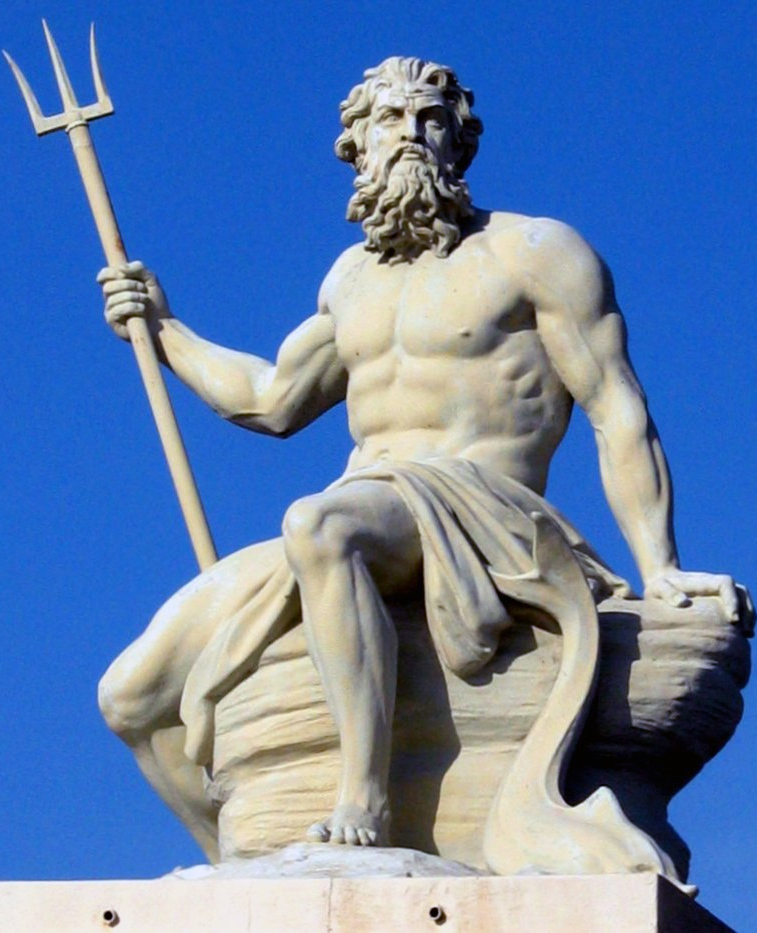
Poseidon/Neptune sculpture in Copenhagen Port

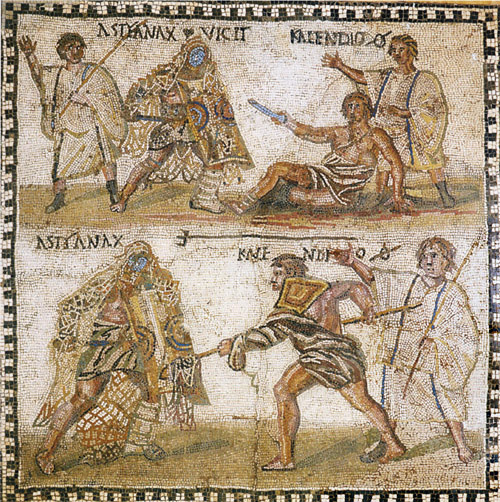
Mosaic from 4th century BC showing a retiarius or "net fighter", with a trident and cast net, fighting a secutor

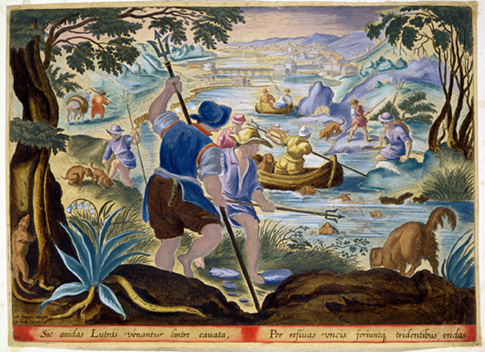
Dutch fishermen using tridents in the 17th century

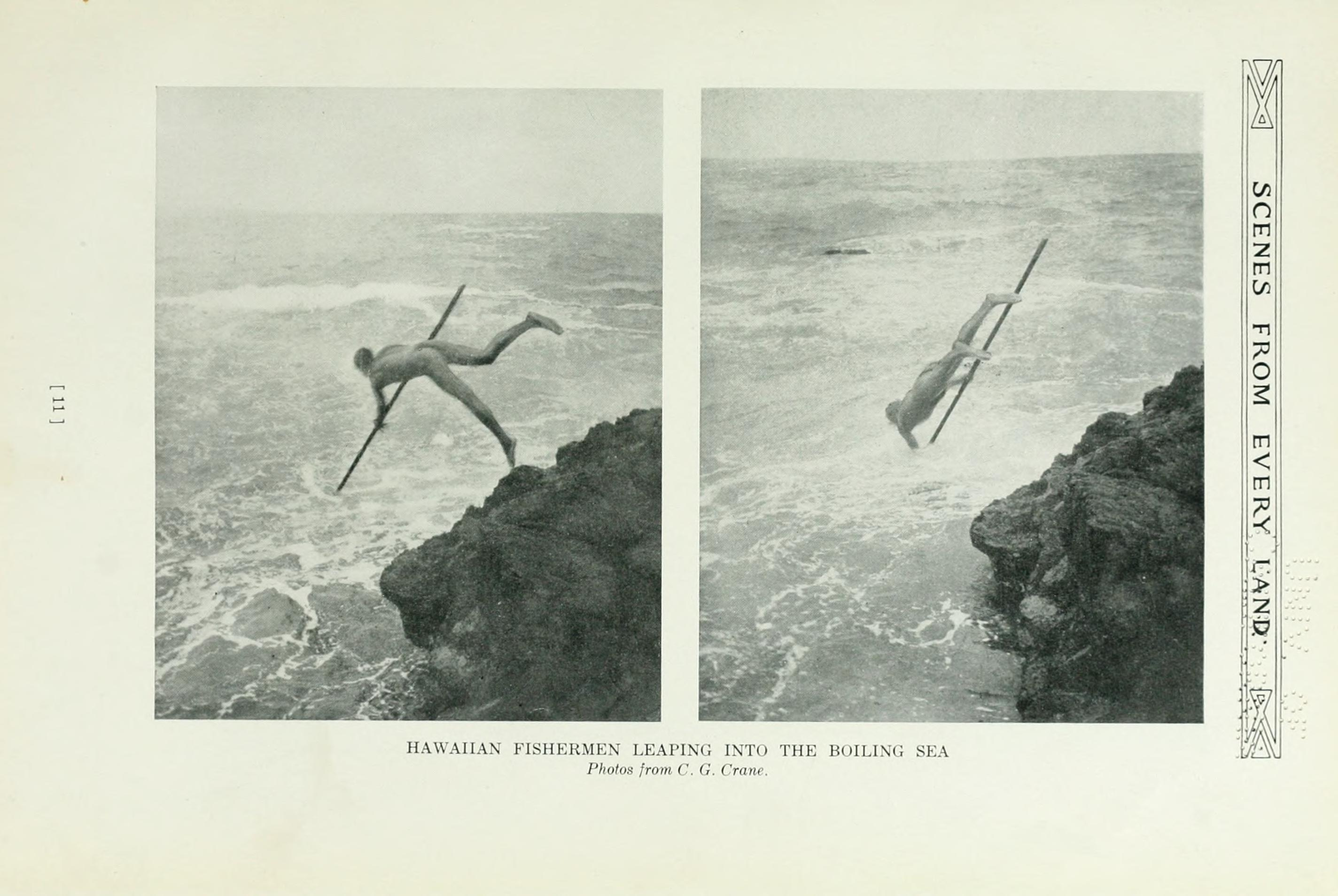
A Hawaiian spearfisher (1909)

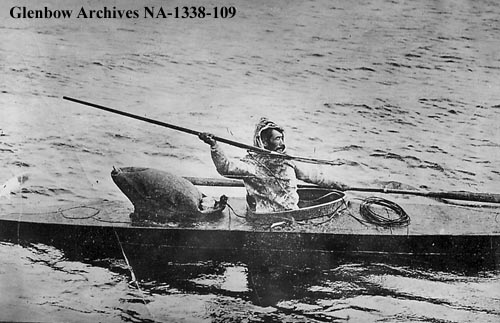
Inuk hunter with harpoon in kayak, Hudson Bay, circa 1908–1914

=== Traditional ===
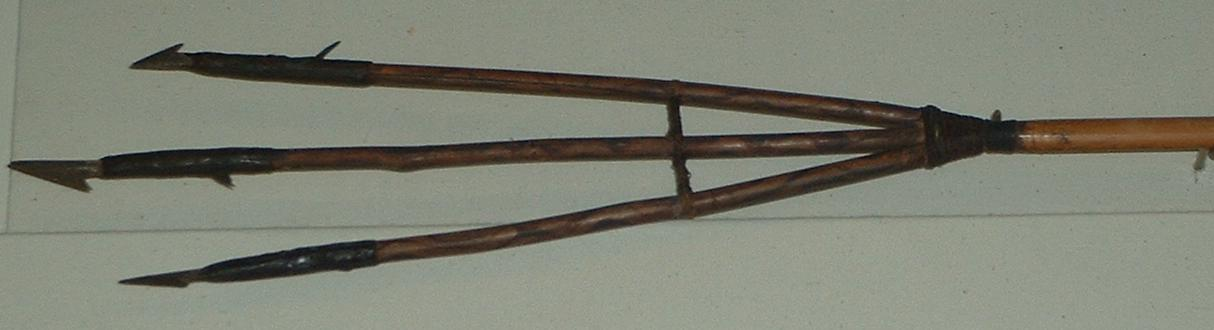
Head of an arrow used for fishing, from Guyana.

Spear fishing is an ancient method of fishing and may be conducted with an ordinary spear or a specialised variant such as an eel spear or the trident. A small trident-type spear with a long handle is used in the American South and Midwest for gigging bullfrogs with a bright light at night, or for gigging carp and other fish in the shallows.

=== Modern ===
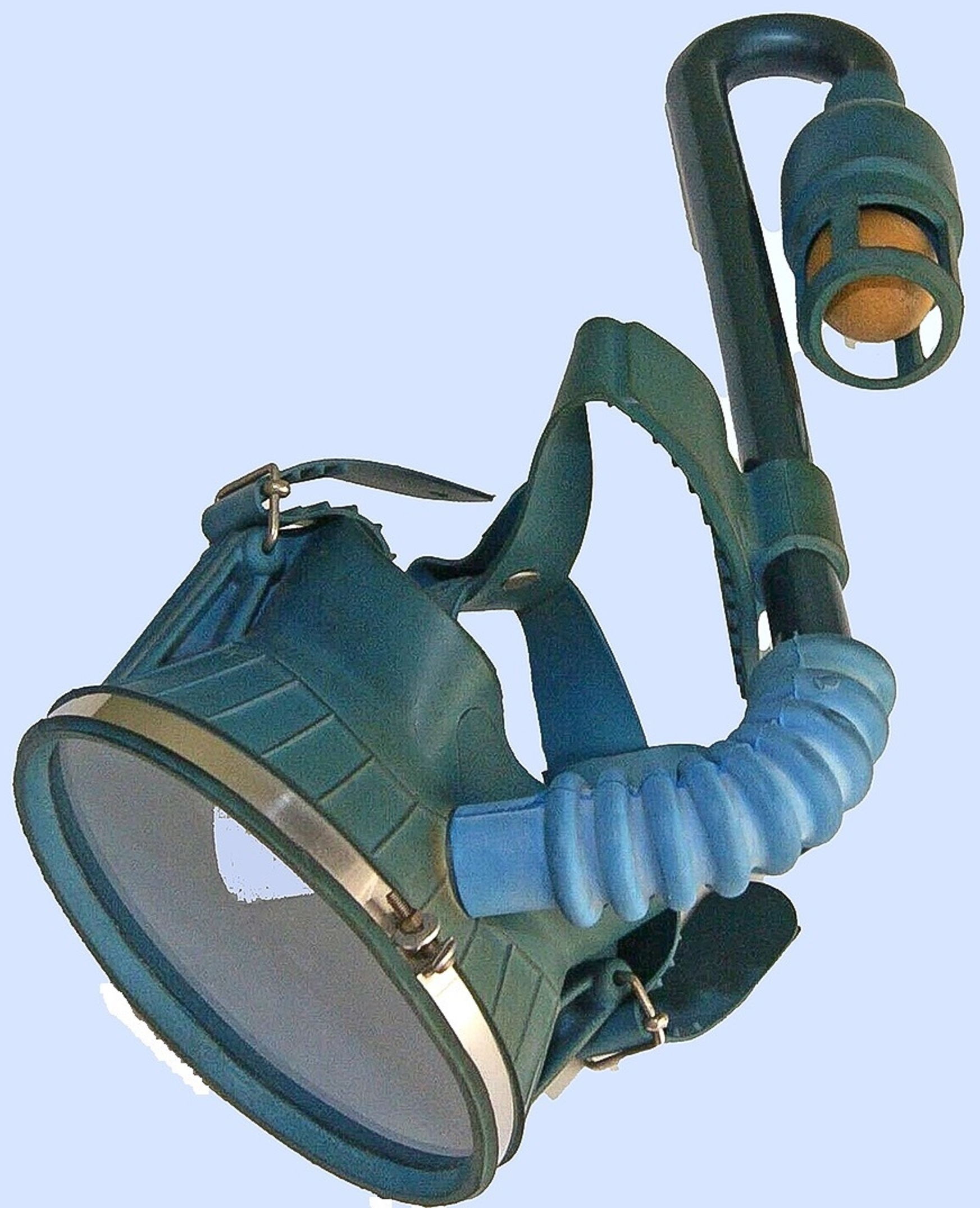
Spearfishing mask with single integrated breathing tube manufactured during the 1950s by the United Service Agency.

Traditional spear fishing is restricted to shallow waters, but the development of the speargun, diving mask and swimfins allows fishing in deeper waters. Some freedivers are able to hold their breath for more than five minutes, a diver with underwater breathing equipment can dive for much longer periods.

In the 1920s, sport spearfishing using only watertight swimming goggles became popular on the Mediterranean coast of France and Italy. This led to development of the modern diving mask, fins and snorkel. The world's first English- and French-language modern spearfishing books, Guy Gilpatric's The Compleat Goggler and Raymond Pulvénis's La Chasse aux Poissons, appeared in 1938 and 1940 respectively. Modern scuba diving had its genesis in the systematic use of rebreathers by Italian sport spearfishers during the 1930s. This practice came to the attention of the Italian Navy, which developed its frogman unit, which affected World War II. By 1940 small groups of people in California, USA had been spearfishing for less than 10 years. Most used imported gear from Europe, while innovators Charlie Sturgill, Jack Prodanovich, and Wally Potts invented and built innovative equipment for California's divers. In the aftermath of World War II, as the supply of the necessary raw materials improved and peacetime encouraged the development of public leisure pursuits and international tourism, the pioneers of modern spearfishing began serial production of underwater hunting equipment. Featured at length in Gilpatric's The Compleat Goggler, expatriate Russian Alec Kramarenko and American Charles Wilen founded their United Service Agency in the southern French city of Nice to manufacture a wide range of spearfishing gear, including diving masks with built-in snorkels enabling swimmers to breathe face down on the surface of the water for long periods while stalking their prey unencumbered by the constant oral presence of a mouthpiece.

During the 1960s, attempts to have spearfishing recognised as an Olympic sport were unsuccessful. Instead, two organisations, the International Underwater Spearfishing Association (IUSA) and the International Bluewater Spearfishing Records Committee (IBSRC), list world record catches by species according to rules to ensure fair competition. Spearfishing is illegal in many bodies of water, and some locations only allow spearfishing during certain seasons.

==== Conservation ====
Spearfishing has been implicated in local disappearances of some species, including the Atlantic goliath grouper on the Caribbean island of Bonaire, the Nassau grouper in the barrier reef off the coast of Belize and the giant black sea bass in California, which have all been listed as endangered. Modern spearfishing has shifted focus onto catching only what one needs and targeting sustainable fisheries. As gear evolved in the 1960s and 1970s spearfishers typically viewed the ocean as an unlimited resource and often sold their catch. This practice is now heavily frowned upon in prominent spearfishing nations for promoting unsustainable methods and encouraging taking more fish than is needed. In countries such as Australia and South Africa where the activity is regulated by state fisheries, spearfishing has been found to be the most environmentally friendly form of fishing due to being highly selective, having no by-catch, causing no habitat damage, nor creating pollution or harm to protected endangered species. In 2007, the Australian Bluewater Freediving Classic became the first spearfishing tournament to be accredited and was awarded 4 out of 5 stars based on environmental, social, safety and economic indicators.

==== Shore diving ====
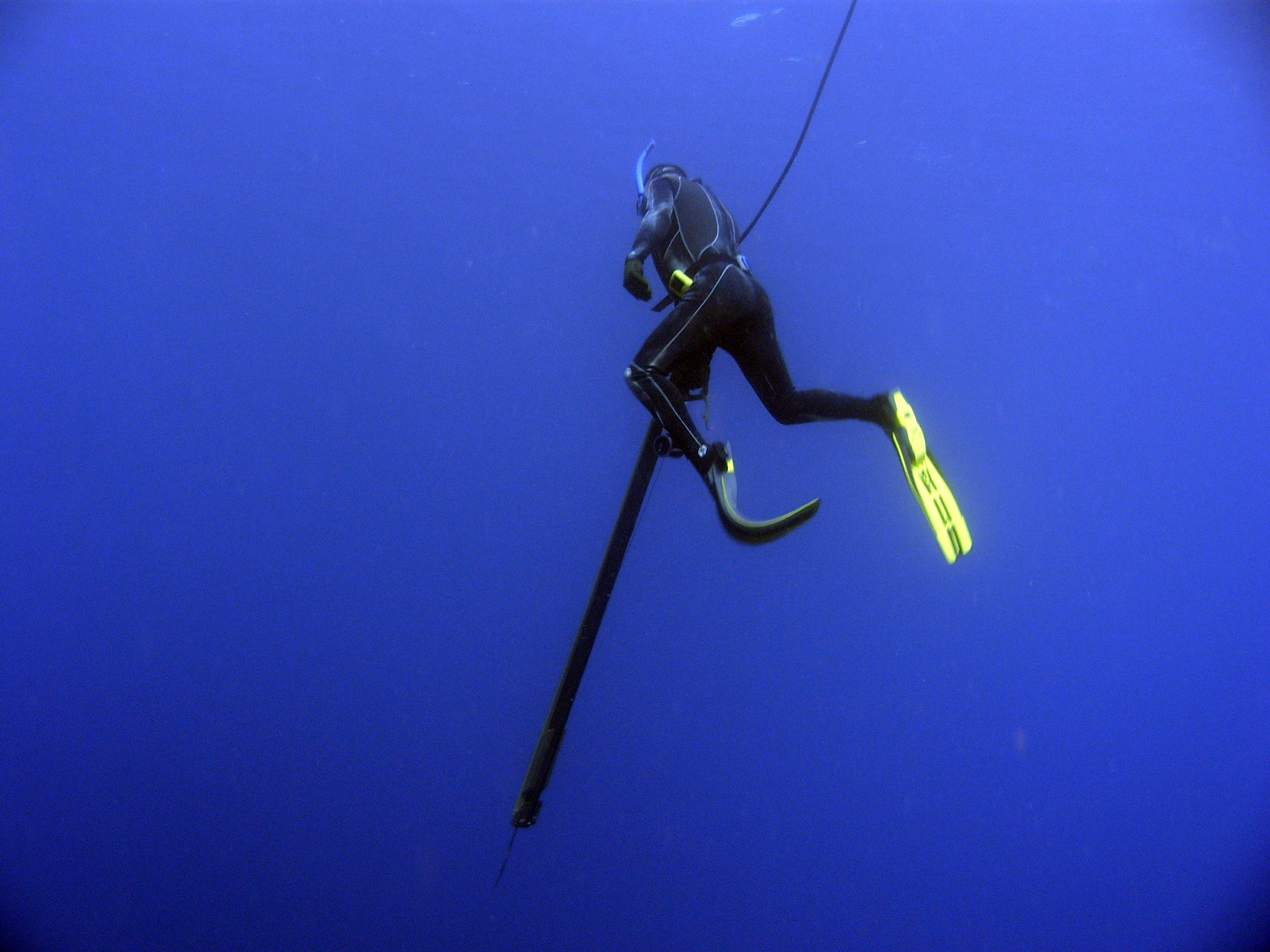
Spearfisherman hunting Yellowfin tuna in the Ryukyu Islands

Shore diving is perhaps the most common form of spearfishing and simply involves entering and exiting the sea from beaches or headlands and hunting around ocean structures, usually reef, but also rocks, kelp or sand. Usually shore divers hunt at depths of 5–25 metres (16–82 ft), depending on location. In some locations, divers can experience drop-offs from 5 to 40 metres (16 to 131 ft) close to the shore line. Sharks and reef fish can be abundant in these locations. In subtropical areas, sharks may be less common, but other challenges face the shore diver, such as managing entry and exit in the presence of big waves. Headlands are favoured for entry because of their proximity to deeper water, but timing is important so the diver does not get pushed onto rocks by waves. Beach entry can be safer, but more difficult due to the need to repeatedly dive through the waves until the surf line is crossed. Divers may enter from a relatively exposed headland, for convenience, then swim to a more protected part of the shore for their exit from the water. Shore dives produce mainly reef fish, but oceangoing pelagic fish are also caught from shore dives in some places, and can be specifically targeted.

Shore diving can be done with trigger-less spears such as pole spears or Hawaiian slings, but more commonly triggered devices such as spearguns. Most shore divers prefer compact railguns or Euro-style spearguns because they offer slim profiles, intuitive loading, and reliable accuracy.

==== Boat diving ====
Boats, ships, kayaks, or even jetski can be used to access offshore reefs or ocean structure. Man-made structures such as oil rigs and Fish Aggregating Devices (FADs) are also fished. Sometimes a boat is necessary to access a location that is close to shore, but inaccessible by land. Methods and gear used for boat diving are similar to shore diving or blue water hunting, depending on the target prey. Boat diving is a worldwide activity. Hot spots include Mozambique, the Three Kings islands of New Zealand (yellowtail), Gulf of Mexico oil rigs (cobia, grouper) and the Great Barrier Reef (wahoo, dogtooth tuna). The deepwater fishing grounds off Cape Point, (Cape Town, South Africa) have become popular with trophy hunting, freediving spearfishers in search of Yellowfin Tuna.

==== Blue water hunting ====
Blue water hunting involves diving in open ocean waters for pelagic species. It involves accessing usually very deep and clear water and chumming for large pelagic fish species such as marlin, tuna, wahoo, or giant trevally. Blue water hunting is often conducted in drifts; the boat driver drops divers and allow them to drift in the current for up to several kilometres before collecting them. Blue water hunters can go for hours without seeing any fish, and without any ocean structure or a visible bottom the divers can experience sensory deprivation and have difficulty determining the size of a solitary fish. One technique to overcome this is to note the size of the fish's eye in relation to its body. Large specimens have a proportionally smaller eye.

The creation of the Australian Bluewater Freediving Classic in 1995 in northern New South Wales was a way of creating interest and promotion of this format of underwater hunting, and contributed to the formation of the International Bluewater Spearfishing Records Committee. The IBSRC formed in 1996, was the first dedicated organization worldwide, created by recognized world leaders in blue-water hunting, to record the capture of pelagic species by blue-water hunters.

Started in 2006 by Dennis Haussler, the Blue Water World Cup in La Ventana, BCS, Mexico has also greatly increased the popularity of the sport at a competitive level. Elite spearfishers from all over the world compete in a 4 day format that involves very selective spearing of pelagic species, with Wahoo, AmberJack, Dorado, Roosterfish, Marlin and Tuna being the target species. The diving is dynamic and challenging with depths that vary from 15 ft to over 100 ft.

Notably, some blue water hunters use large multi-band wooden guns and make use of breakaway rigs to catch and subdue their prey. If the prey is large and still has fight left after being subdued, a second gun can provide a kill shot at a safe distance. This is acceptable to IBSRC and IUSA regulations as long as the diver loads it himself in the water. Blue water hunting is conducted worldwide, but notable hot spots include Baja Mexico (yellowfin tuna, wahoo), Southern California (bluefin tuna), Tanzania (dogtooth tuna, wahoo and yellowfin tuna), Mozambique (dogtooth tuna, wahoo and giant turrum), South Africa (Yellowfin tuna, Spanish Mackerel, wahoo, marlin and giant turrum), Australia (dogtooth tuna, wahoo and Spanish Mackerel) and the South Pacific (dogtooth tuna).

==== Freshwater hunting ====
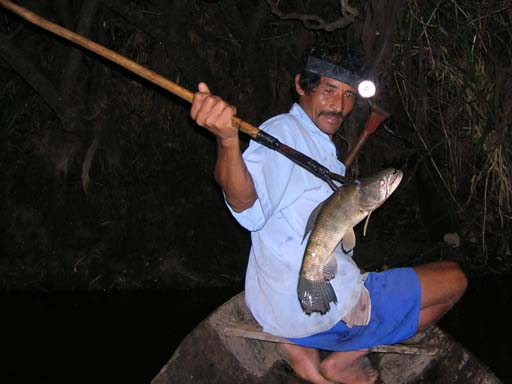
Night spear fishing, Amazon basin, Peru

Many US states allow spearfishing in lakes and rivers, but most of them restrict divers to shooting only rough fish such as carp, gar, bullheads, suckers, etc. Some US states do allow the taking of certain gamefish such as sunfish, crappies, striped bass, catfish and walleyes. Freshwater hunters typically have to deal with widely varying seasonal changes in water clarity due to flooding, algae blooms and lake turnover. Midwestern and north central scuba divers go spearfishing under the ice in the winter.

In the summer the majority of freshwater spearfishers use snorkelling gear rather than scuba since many of the fish they pursue are in relatively shallow water. Carp shot by freshwater spearfishers typically end up being used as fertilizer, bait for trappers, or are occasionally donated to zoos.

==== Without diving ====
Spearfishing with a hand-held spear from land, shallow water or boat has been undertaken for thousands of years. The fisher must account for optical refraction at the water's surface, which makes fish appear higher in their line of sight than they are. By experience, the fisher learns to aim lower. Calm and shallow waters are favored for spearing fish from above the surface, as water clarity is of utmost importance. Many people who grew up on farms in the midwest U.S. in the 1940s-'60s recall going spearing for carp with pitchforks when their fields flooded in the spring. Spearfishing in this manner has some similarities to bowfishing.

== Equipment ==
This is a list of equipment commonly used in spearfishing. Not all of it is necessary and spearfishing is often undertaken with minimal gear.

=== Speargun ===
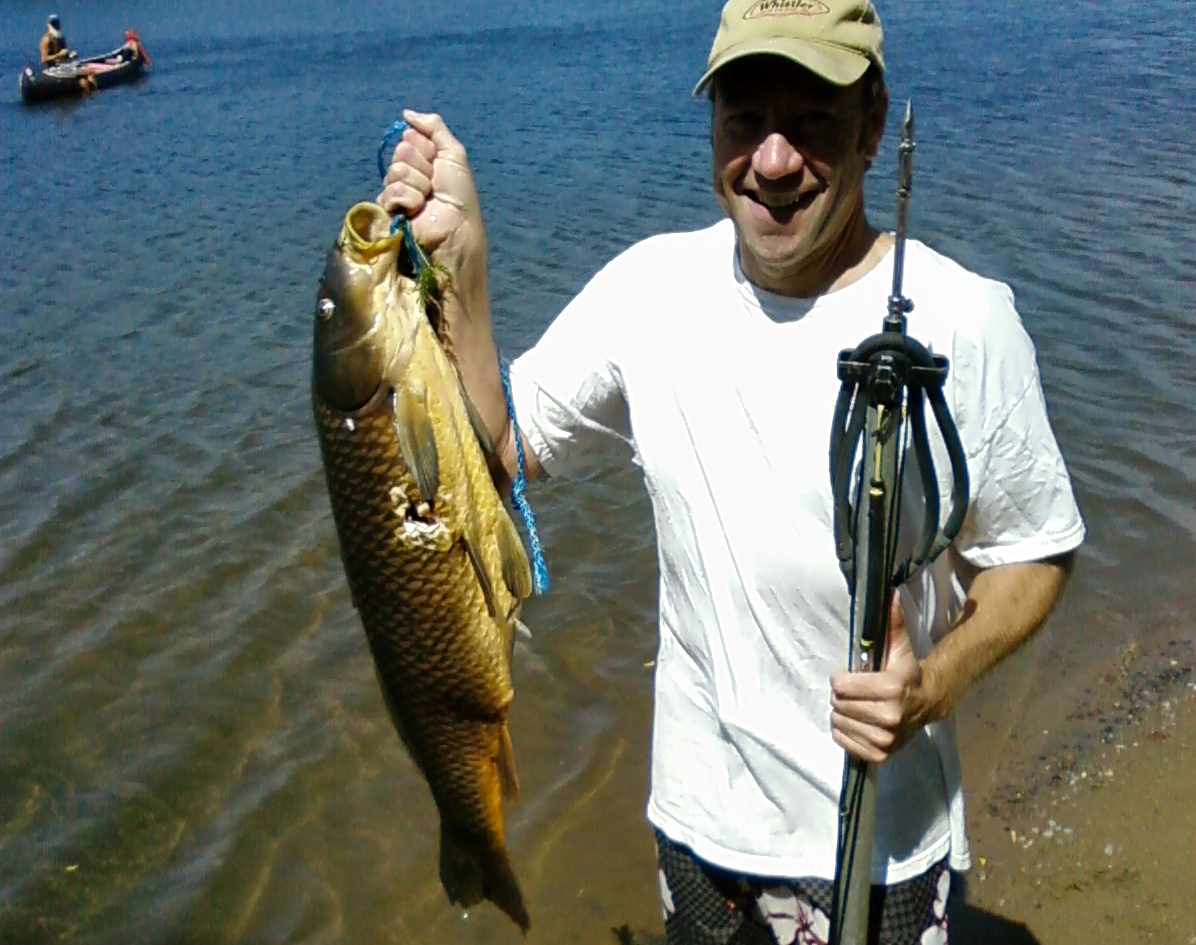
A common carp shot with a band-powered speargun by a diver using snorkelling gear, Minnesota, US

A speargun is an underwater fishing tool designed to launch a tethered short spear at a fish or other marine animal (e.g. a lobster). The most popular spearguns are elastically powered by natural latex rubber bands like a slingshot, while pneumatic powered spearguns are also used, but are less powerful.

=== Polespear ===
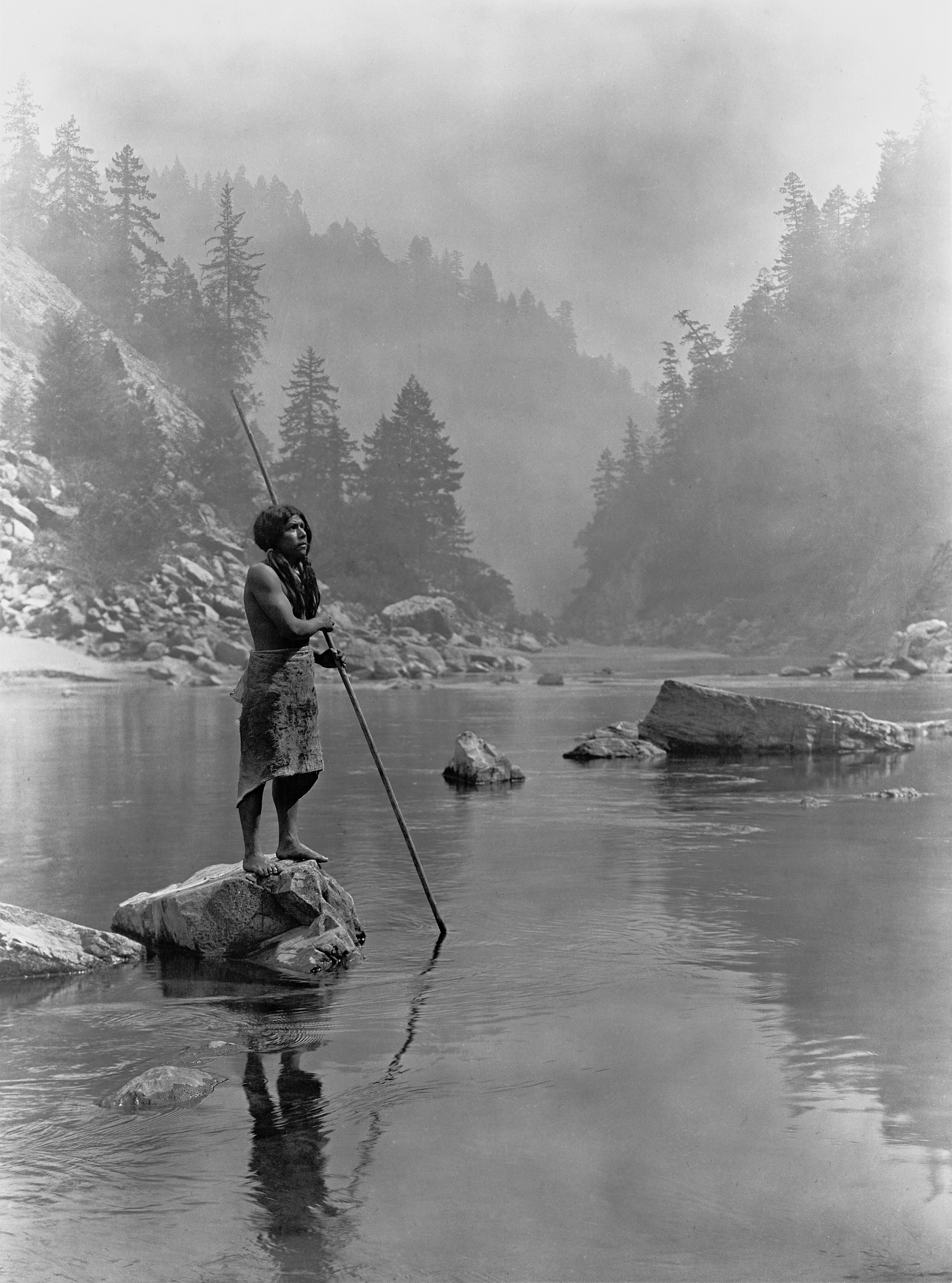
A Hupa man with his spear

Polespears or hand spears consist of a long shaft with point at one end and an elastic loop at the other for propulsion. They also come in a wide variety, from aluminum or titanium metal, to fiberglass or carbon fiber. Often they are screwed together from smaller pieces or able to be folded down for ease of transport. In 1951 Charlie Sturgill beat the competition (who were all using spearguns) with his own pole spear design.

=== Hawaiian slings ===
Hawaiian slings consist of an elastic band attached to a tube, through which a spear is launched.

=== Wetsuit ===
Wetsuits designed specifically for spearfishing are often two-piece (jacket and high waisted pants or 'long-john' style pants with shoulder straps) and are black or are fully or partially camouflage.

=== Weight belt or vest ===
Weight belt and vest are used to compensate for wetsuit buoyancy and help the diver descend to depth. Rubber belts which can be quickly released in an emergency have proven to be particularly popular for spearfishing worldwide. This is because the rubber stretches when fitted and retracts as the body and wetsuit compress underwater, keeping them in place more effectively than non-stretch webbing belts, which tend to slide around more underwater as they loosen with depth. Most spearfishing equipment manufacturers now offer rubber weight belts.

=== Fins ===
Longfins are the most common type of fins used by modern freedivers and spearfishermen. The length of the freediving longfin blade provides energy and oxygen consumption benefits during all phases of the dive. Longfin blades are constructed with a variety of materials, including plastic, fiberglass, and carbon fiber. Many hunters chose longfins with camouflage color patters. The foot pocket is closed and not adjustable. For many decades, women divers faced significant difficulty finding proper fitting foot pockets for freediving longfins, as the industry is vastly dominated by men. Only in recent years have more companies offered foot pockets that fit women and youth divers. The industry also offers more variety in fin blades that vary in thickness to offer different levels of kicking resistance for divers. Properly fitting foot pockets and appropriately matched fin blades are essential for freediving form.

The types of fins used by SCUBA divers are generally shorter, bulky, and not favored for freediving. SCUBA diving fins usually feature an open heel design with buckles and straps. The fin blades often have bright colors and may be split down the middle. Bodysurfing fins have also been used successfully by many spearfishermen.

=== Diving knife or cutters ===
A utility knife or side cutter (typically made of saltwater corrosion-resistant material such as stainless steel or titanium alloy) is carried as a safety precaution in case the diver becomes tangled in a spearline or floatline. It can also be used to deliver a coup de grâce and kill the fish quickly.

=== Kill spike ===
In lieu of a knife, a sharpened metal spike can be used to kill the fish quickly and humanely upon capture. Ikejime is a Japanese term for kill-spiking a fish, a method traditionally used by Japanese fishermen. Killing the fish quickly is believed to improve the flavor of the flesh by limiting the buildup of lactic acid in the fish's muscles. It also reduces chance of attracting opportunistic sharks by stopping the fish thrashing.

=== Buoy and floatline ===
A buoy is usually tethered to the spearfisher's speargun or directly to the spear. A buoy helps to subdue large fish. It can also assist in storing fish. But is more importantly used as a safety device to warn boat drivers there is diver in the area - usually by being large, brightly colored and flying a dive flag (the red flag with white diagonal stripe in the USA or the blue & white "alpha" flag elsewhere in the world). A typical spearo dive float will be torpedo-shaped, orange or red in colour with a volume of between 7 and 36 litres and display a dive flag on a short mast. However, other designs, such as inflatable mini-dinghy, planche (box), Tommy Botha (big game) and body-boards are also used.

A floatline connects the buoy to the speargun or to the weight-belt. Often made from braided polyester, they are also frequently made from mono-filament encased in an airtight plastic tube, or made from stretchable bungee cord.

=== Gloves ===
Cut-resistant gloves protect the hands when retrieving fish from coral or rock crevices, when loading the bands on rubber powered spearguns and from the teeth and spines of struggling fish. They are also used for thermal protection in colder water.

=== Stringer ===
Fish stringers are used to store speared fish while diving. Usually a length of cable, cord, string or monofilament terminated by a loop (and sometimes a swivel) at one end and a large stainless steel pin/spike at the other. The pin is typically 15–30 cm long, 4-8mm diameter, with a sharp point at one end, and with the cable threaded through a hole, usually in the middle, so the spike functions as a toggle once threaded. The pin can optionally be used as an iki jime spike, to dispatch speared fish. It can alternatively be a large, shaped loop of stainless steel. The stringer may be attached to the dive float, especially in areas of high shark activity, although some divers will use a clip to attach their stringer to their weight belt, or the base of their speargun.

=== Snorkel and diving mask ===
Spearfishing snorkels and diving masks are similar to those used for scuba diving, although spearfishing masks usually have two eye lenses and a lower internal volume.

=== Diver down flag ===
The "Diver Down" flag (also called a "dive flag") is a warning flag floating on the water to indicate to other boats, personal watercraft and aircraft that there is a diver below. When in use, it signals to other boats to keep clear, watch for divers in the water, and approach at a slow speed.

== Management ==
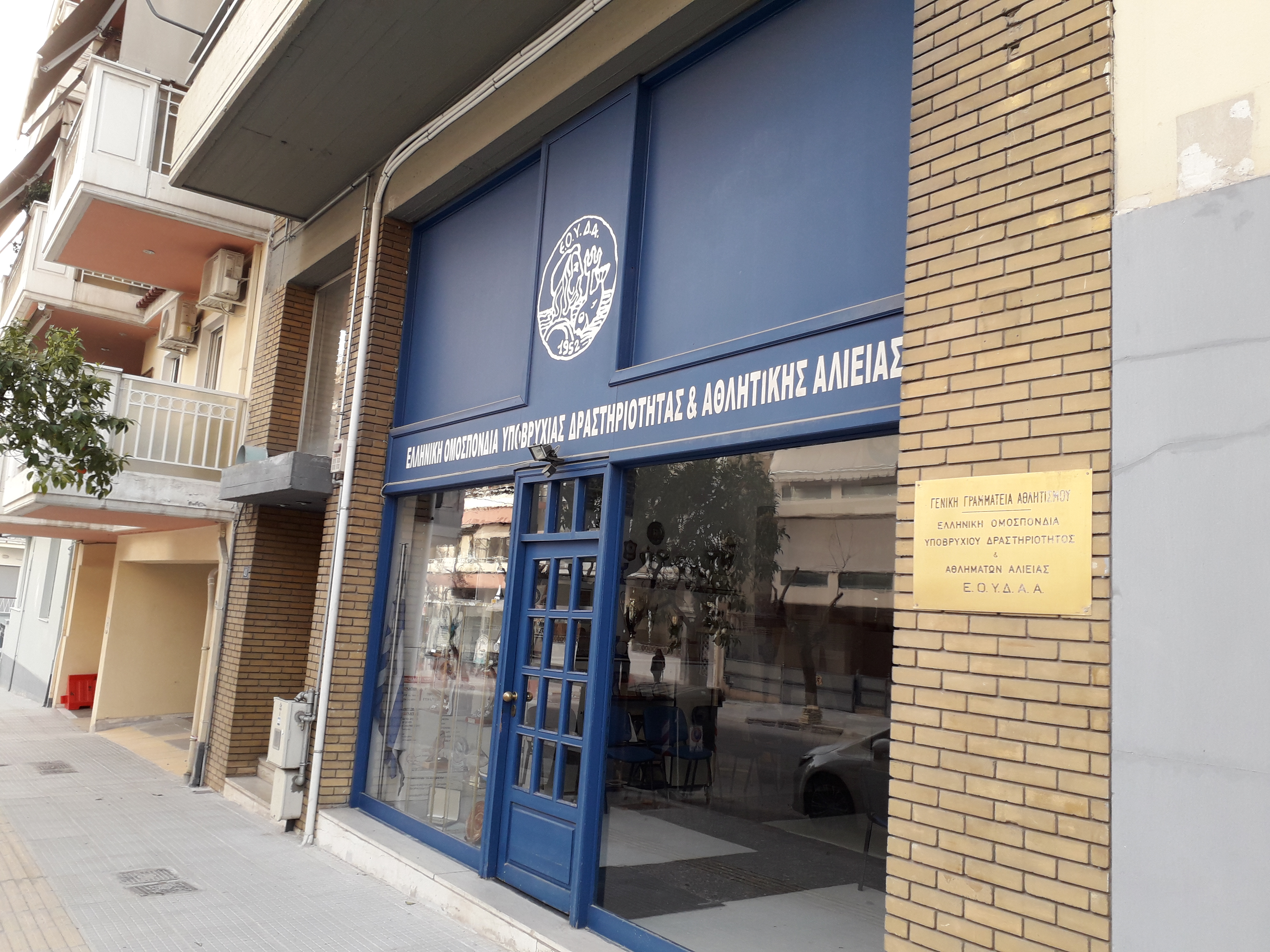
Office of the Hellenic Federation of Underwater Activity & Sport Fishing

Spearfishing is intensively managed throughout the world. Under recent EU guidelines, recreational spearfishing is now explicitly permitted in the EU's Atlantic waters. The use of SCUBA equipment for spearfishing is now illegal in many parts of the world, although it remains legal and popular within many parts of the United States. Within the EU, the use of SCUBA for spearfishing is now illegal, in addition to a ban on spearfishing at night. European countries that are not within EU law do not have this regulation. The use of SCUBA is banned from CMAS Spearfishing Competition events.

Australia allows only recreational spearfishing and generally only breath-hold free diving. State & territory governments impose numerous restrictions, demarcating Marine Protected Areas, Closed Areas, Protected Species, size/bag limits and equipment. Most of the authorities have different set of rules, recommendations, and regulations to be followed when it comes to spearfishing; for example; Dive Newcastle recommends spearfishing being accompanied by a friend. The body principally concerned with spearfishing is the Australian Underwater Federation, Australia's peak recreational diving body. The AUF's vision for spearfishing is "Safe, Sustainable, Selective, Spearfishing". The AUF provides membership, advocacy and organises competitions.

Regulations governing spearfishing in Tanzania have been the subject of controversy. Commercial spearfishing is illegal while spearfishing for sport is legal but requires that Tanzanian citizens hold a specific sport spearfishing license. Foreigners may spearfish for sport only if they are accompanied by a registered and authorized sport spearfishing charter operator.

Norway has a relatively large ratio of coastline to population, and has one of the most liberal spearfishing rules in the northern hemisphere. Spearfishing with scuba gear is widespread among recreational divers. Restrictions in Norway are limited to anadrome species, like Atlantic salmon, sea trout, and lobster.

In Mexico a regular fishing permit allows spearfishing, but not electro-mechanical spearguns. Spearfishing with scuba gear is illegal and the use of power heads as well. Penalties are severe and include fines, confiscation of gear and even imprisonment.

United States has different spearfishing regulations for each state. In Florida spearfishing is restricted to several hundred yards offshore in many areas and the usage of a powerhead is prohibited within state waters. Many types of fish are currently under heavy bag restrictions. In California only recreational spearfishing is allowed. California also imposes numerous restrictions, demarcating Marine protected areas, closed areas, protected species, size/bag limits and equipment.

Spearfishing in Puerto Rico has its own set of rules. Here you are allowed to freedive with a speargun in marine waters. Spearfishing with scuba gear or in freshwater is not allowed.

In the UK, while spearfishing is not explicitly regulated, it is instead subject to both local (typically bye-laws) and national-level legislation relating to permitted fish species and minimum size limits. For example, it is not permitted to spearfish in freshwater and the non-tidal reaches of rivers.

== Competitive spearfishing ==
Competitive spearfishing is defined by the world governing body CMAS as "the hunting and capture of fish underwater without the aid of artificial breathing devices, using gear that depends entirely on the physical strength of the competitor." They publish a set of competition rules that are used by affiliated organisations. Since 1994, spearfishing has been at the Micronesian Games, with modern spearfishing making its debut in 2006.

== Notable spearfishers ==
This is an alphabetic list of spearfishers who are confirmed by a reliable source or an existing Wikipedia article.

- Rob Allen - South Africa
- Olivier Bardoux - France
- James Borja - Guam
- Tommy Botha - South Africa
- Mike Cassidy - Guam
- Peter Crawford - England, 13 times UK champion
- Ben Cropp – Australian documentary filmmaker, conservationist and spearfisherman
- Ray Flores - Guam
- Michael Genereux - Guam
- Wally Gibbons
- Guy Gilpatric – American journalist
- James Grant - New Zealand
- David J. Hochman - World Record Holder, Men's Speargun, Striped Bass, 31.0 kg/68.4 lbs; Men's Polespear, Striped Bass, 23.8 kg/52.4 lbs
- Harold Holt – Prime Minister of Australia from 1966 to 1967 - Australian prime minister
- Vane Ivanović - Yugoslav-British athlete, diplomat and author of Modern Spearfishing
- Cameron Kirkconnell - 12x world record holder
- Mohammed Jassim Al-Kuwari - Qatar
- George "Doc" Lopez – Freediver and spearfisherman
- Terry Maas - USA
- Clint Madracheluib - Palau
- Barry Paxman - Australia
- Raymond Pulvénis - France; equipment inventor and manufacturer; author of first French book entirely dedicated to spearfishing (La chasse aux poissons, 1940)
- Felix Sasamoto - Northern Mariana Islands
- Gérard Ségura - France
- Moy Shmull - Palau
- Dr Adam Smith - Australian national champion, scientist, author of Underwater fishing in Australia and New Zealand
- Charlie Sturgill - USA; US National spearfishing champion 1951; innovator of modern spearfishing equipment
- Ron Taylor – Australian diver and shark cinematographer
- Valerie Taylor – Australian underwater photographer
- Valentine Thomas - former Lawyer and current spearfisher and sustainability advocate
- Daryl Wong - USA equipment maker

== See also ==
- Underwater target shooting – Underwater sport
- Gaffing – Hooked pole for pulling fish out of water
- Bowfishing – Fishing with archery equipment
