= 2010 Micronesian Games =

Multi-sport event

VII Micronesian Games
- Host city: Koror
- Country: Palau
- Motto: "Tia de Prerii" (We Will Make It Happen)
- Nations: 8
- Athletes: 1000
- Events: 15 sports
- Opening: August 1, 2010
- Closing: August 10, 2010
- Opened by: Johnson Toribiong
- Torch lighter: Elgin Loren Elwais
- Main venue: Palau National Track & Field

The 7th Micronesian Games was held August 1–10 in Palau.

Initially, the 7th Games were to be hosted in Majuro, Marshall Islands; however, in April 2008, the organisers announced that the Games could be "scaled down", with a number events cancelled due to a lack of facilities in Majuro. In May 2008, the Marshall Islands announced that it was withdrawing from hosting the competition. The hosting of the Games was subsequently awarded to Palau., which previously hosted the 1998 Games.

The Games were officially opened by the President of the Republic of Palau, Johnson Toribiong. He participated at the first Micronesian Games 1969 in baseball, but for the Mariana Islands (now Northern Mariana Islands) team. Before opening the Games, he also took part at this year's torch relay during the opening ceremony in the stadium. Torch lighter was wrestler Elgin Loren Elwais, who participated for Palau at the 2008 Summer Olympics.

== Participating countries ==
- Chuuk
- Guam
- Kosrae
- Marshall Islands
- Northern Mariana Islands
- Palau
- Pohnpei
- Yap

== Sports ==
Participants competed in fifteen sports:

Sport	Dates	Venue
Athletics	August 3–6	Palau National Track & Field
Baseball	August 1–10	Asahi Ball Field
Basketball (results)	August 1–10	Palau National Gymnasium
Canoe	August 6+7	Meyuns Seaplane Ramp
Fastpitch (softball)	August 1–10	Meyuns Ball Field
Micro All Around	August 4+5	Kayangel State
Spearfishing	August 7+8	Drop Off, Malakal
Swimming	August 2–5	Palau National Swimming Pool
Table Tennis	August 3–5	
Tennis	August 1–10	Airai Tennis Courts
Triathlon	August 9	Palau Pacific Resort
Beach Volleyball	August 1–10	Long Island Beach
Indoor Volleyball	August 1–10	Palau High School Gym
Weightlifting	August 7–9	Kalau Gym, Meyuns
Wrestling	August 3–5	

=== Spearfishing ===
Event	Gold	Silver	Bronze
Individual	Moy Shmull; Palau	Asailee Yamada; Palau	Michael Genereux; Guam
Team	Guam; Jay Sternadel; Michael Genereux	Pohnpei; Taylor Paul; Ioakim Mikel	Kosrae; Rodney M. Edmond; N. Mongkeya
