= 2018 Micronesian Games =

Regional multisport event

IX Micronesian Games
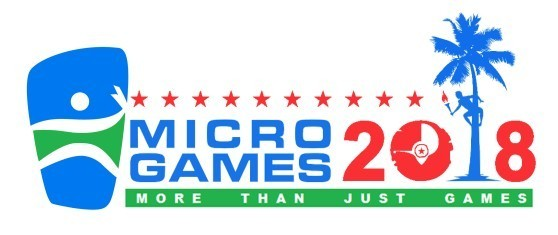
- Host city: Yap
- Country: Micronesia
- Motto: More than Just Games
- Nations: 9
- Events: 13 sports
- Opening: July 15, 2018
- Closing: July 27, 2018

The 9th Micronesian Games were held from July 15 to July 27, 2018, in Yap, Federated States of Micronesia. The venues included the Matson Sports Complex in Abay, and several locations around Colonia.

== Participating nations ==
Ordinarily, there are 10 participants at the games. However, Nauru was unable to fully compete in this edition due to travel costs. Of the fifty-five that were to be the Nauruan team to the Games, only one Nauruan athlete participated; in the end, Jonah Harris won a total of 5 medals, 2 of which were gold.

As such, the participants at the games were: the four constituent states of the Federated States of Micronesia (Chuuk, Kosrae, Pohnpei, Yap), three sovereign countries (Kiribati, Marshall Islands, Palau) and two insular areas of the United States (Northern Mariana Islands, Guam) all located within the Micronesia region.

== Sports ==
Athletes competed in 13 different sports at the games: athletics, baseball, basketball, beach volleyball, the "Micronesian all-around", open water swimming, soccer, spearfishing, va'a, table tennis, volleyball, weightlifting, and wrestling.

Previously at the 2014 games 14 sports were contested. However, this edition of the games saw the removal of softball and tennis and the inclusion of beach volleyball.

== Medal table ==
Despite Nauru's withdrawal from the games, individual athlete Jonah Harris was still able to win 5 medals. The final medal table is as follows:

* Host nation ( Yap)

Rank	Nation	Gold	Silver	Bronze	Total
1	Palau	32	18	20	70
2	Marshall Islands	29	17	6	52
3	Guam	29	12	12	53
4	(Pohnpei State) Pohnpei	18	33	19	70
5	Northern Mariana Islands	9	18	9	36
6	(Yap State) Yap*	5	12	14	31
7	(Chuuk State) Chuuk	5	1	3	9
8	Kiribati	2	2	2	6
9	Nauru	2	2	1	5
10	Kosrae	0	4	10	14
Totals (10 entries)		131	119	96	346

== Medalists ==
=== Athletics ===
Men

Event	Gold	Silver	Bronze
100 m	Jonah Harris; Nauru	Rodman Teltull; Palau	Scott Fiti; Chuuk
200 m	Rodman Teltull; Palau	Jonah Harris; Nauru	Scott Fiti; Chuuk
400 m	Kiudone David; Chuuk	Douglas Schmidt; Northern Mariana Islands	Joseph Aguon; Guam
800 m	Joshua Ilustre; Guam	Darin Pascua; Guam	IS Arongaw; Chuuk
1500 m	Joshua Ilustre; Guam	Cristian Etpison Nicolescu; Palau	Tyler Santos; Northern Mariana Islands
5000 m	Ryan Matienzo; Guam	Benjamin Middlebrooke; Guam	Cristian Etpison Nicolescu; Palau
10000 m	Ryan Matienzo; Guam	Benjamin Middlebrooke; Guam	Casey Henry; Pohnpei
15000 m	Benjamin Middlebrooke; Guam	MJ Ioanis; Pohnpei	not awarded
110 m hurdles	Elias Ryan; Pohnpei	Mighty-Jay Bernardo; Pohnpei	Skyler Mason; Pohnpei
400 m hurdles	Jeofry Limtiaco; Guam	Elias Ryan; Pohnpei	Casey Henry; Pohnpei
4 × 100 m relay	Palau; Adrian Ililau; Gwynn Uehara; Rodman Teltull; Ian Koshiba	Chuuk; Oneison McMahon; Benoni Kin; Nomar Jimenez; Scott Fiti	Kiribati; Kimwaua Makin; Tirioro Willie; Mobera Tonana; Biira Burennaira
4 × 400 m relay	Chuuk; Kuidone David; Scott Fiti; Francis Rikat; Benoni Kin	Palau; Rodman Teltull; Gwynn Uehara; Joab Kanai; Dusty Etpison	Guam; Darin Pascua; Paul John Dimalanta; Joseph Aguon; Jeofry Limtiaco
High jump	Lataisi Mwea; Kiribati	Jonah Harris; Nauru	Kius Pius You; Yap
Long jump	Jonah Harris; Nauru	Buraieta Yeeting; Kiribati	Devon Aquinas; Pohnpei
Triple jump	Biira Burennaira; Kiribati	Douglas Schmidt; Northern Mariana Islands	Jonah Harris; Nauru
Shot put	Florian Skilang Temengil; Palau	Sione Aho; Marshall Islands	Javez Mooteb; Yap
Discus throw	Florian Skilang Temengil; Palau	Sione Aho; Marshall Islands	Javez Mooteb; Yap
Javelin throw	Dougwin Franz; Palau	Iverson August; Palau	Nicholas Gross; Northern Mariana Islands
Octathlon	Mighty-Jay Bernardo; Pohnpei	Joab Kanai; Palau	Bradley Ponens; Pohnpei

Women

Event	Gold	Silver	Bronze
100 m	Regine Tugade; Guam	Zarinae Sapong; Northern Mariana Islands	Shania Bulala; Guam
200 m	Zarinae Sapong; Northern Mariana Islands	Shania Bulala; Guam	Celine Amparo; Guam
400 m	Regine Tugade; Guam	Madison Packbier; Guam	Emiko Leit; Pohnpei
800 m	Genina Criss; Guam	Madison Packbier; Guam	Elenna Santos; Northern Mariana Islands
1500 m	Genina Criss; Guam	Elenna Santos; Northern Mariana Islands	Madison Packbier; Guam
5000 m	Genina Criss; Guam	Reloliza Saimon; Pohnpei	not awarded
10000 m	Genina Criss; Guam	Reloliza Saimon; Pohnpei	Anaya Masang; Palau
15000 m	Reloliza Saimon; Pohnpei	not awarded	not awarded
100 m hurdles	Richelle Tugade; Guam	Rachel Abrams; Northern Mariana Islands	Aubry Ngirangesill; Palau
400 m hurdles	Richelle Tugade; Guam	Sydney Francisco; Palau	not awarded
4 × 100 m relay	Guam; Madison Packbier; Richelle Tugade; Celine Amparo; Shania Bulala	Pohnpei; Saya Shigeta; Emiko Leit; Meliza Bartolome; Darla Jonah	Northern Mariana Islands; Jamie Pangelinan; Zarinae Sapong; Elenna Santos; Rachel Abrams
4 × 400 m relay	Guam; Shania Bulala; Madison Packbier; Richelle Tugade; Celine Amparo	Pohnpei; Meliza Bartolome; Diana Shigeta; Darla Jonah; Emiko Leit	Northern Mariana Islands; Therize Millare; Jerlyn Castillo; Zarinae Sapong; Elenna Santos
High jump	Rachel Abrams; Northern Mariana Islands	Rosemaline Watley; Marshall Islands	Amaya Ngirkelau; Palau
Long jump	Regine Tugade; Guam	Shania Bulala; Guam	Richelle Tugade; Guam
Triple jump	Richelle Tugade; Guam	Rosemaline Watley; Marshall Islands	Jerlyn Castillo; Northern Mariana Islands
Shot put	Genie Gerardo; Guam	Sidra Triplett; Marshall Islands	Amanda Cruz; Guam
Discus throw	Sidra Triplett; Marshall Islands	Genie Gerardo; Guam	Amanda Cruz; Guam
Javelin throw	Genie Gerardo; Guam	Sandonia Likor; Pohnpei	Amaya Ngirkelau; Palau

=== Baseball ===
Event	Gold	Silver	Bronze
Men	Pohnpei	Northern Mariana Islands	Kosrae

=== Basketball ===
Event	Gold	Silver	Bronze
Men	Guam	Marshall Islands	Pohnpei
Women	Guam	Marshall Islands	Palau

=== Beach volleyball ===
Event	Gold	Silver	Bronze
Men	Palau; Sakiusa Naivana; Texxon Taro	Kiribati; Talaika Manuera; Uerei Touati	Guam; Ryan Eugenio; Shitaro Okada
Women	Palau; Holly Yamada; Hila Asanuma	Marshall Islands; Aliyah Brown; Sidra Triplett	Marshall Islands; Rutha Pedro; Darcyann Muller

=== Micronesian all-around ===
Event	Gold	Silver	Bronze
Men	Jasper Ponapart; Pohnpei	Joseph Roman; Palau	Talley Hairens; Pohnpei
Women	Roiolynn Jim; Pohnpei	Serleen Agrippa; Pohnpei	Julita Blibei; Palau

=== Open water swimming ===
Event	Gold	Silver	Bronze
Men's 2.5 km	Kento Akimaru; Northern Mariana Islands	Noel Keane; Palau	Jericho Maido; Palau
Men's 5 km	Noel Keane; Palau	Kento Akimaru; Northern Mariana Islands	Jericho Maido; Palau
Women's 2.5 km	Osisang Chilton; Palau	Sophia Klair Gauran; Northern Mariana Islands	Kestra Aileen Nihleng; Pohnpei
Women's 5 km	Osisang Chilton; Palau	Sophia Klair Gauran; Northern Mariana Islands	Roylin Akiwo; Palau
Mixed 5 km relay	Palau; Noel Keane; Osisang Chilton; Roylin Akiwo; Jericho Maido	Northern Mariana Islands; Kento Akimaru; Sophia Klair Gauran; Keanna Villagomez; Jinnosuke Suzuki	not awarded

=== Soccer ===
Event	Gold	Silver	Bronze
Men	Pohnpei	Yap	Palau

=== Spearfishing ===
Event	Gold	Silver	Bronze
Individual	Michael Genereux; Guam	Luis Ongalibang; Palau	Taylor Paul; Pohnpei
Team	Guam; Michael Genereux; Ray Flores; Mike Cassidy	Pohnpei; Taylor Paul; Benco Adolf; MacGrady Barnabas	Yap; Anthony Yanrin; Phillip Yangmal; Sylvester Yanruw

=== Table tennis ===
Event	Gold	Silver	Bronze
Men's singles	Ramon Gulla; Palau	Samuel Saunders; Palau	Nena George; Palau
Men's singles	Ramon Gulla; Palau	Samuel Saunders; Palau	John Thomsin; Pohnpei
Women's singles	Jeremai Watanabe; Palau	Portiana Franz; Palau	Aberlynn Ngiruos; Palau
Women's singles	Jeremai Watanabe; Palau	Portiana Franz; Palau	Meilin Chin; Palau
Men's doubles	Palau; Ramon Gulla; Samuel Saunders	Palau; Nena George; Shawnessy Soalablai	Marshall Islands; Kabuati Bob; Ricky Bokadrik
Men's doubles	Palau; Ramon Gulla; Samuel Saunders	Palau; Nena George; Shawnessy Soalablai	Pohnpei; Antonio Tom; John Thomsin
Women's doubles	Palau; Jeremai Watanabe; Jada Osiik	Palau; Aberlynn Ngiruos; Meilin Chin	Yap; Viviana Bamtin; Mandiala Gamagag
Women's doubles	Palau; Jeremai Watanabe; Jada Osiik	Palau; Aberlynn Ngiruos; Meilin Chin	Marshall Islands; Kitlan Paguiligan; Annalyn Laikidrik
Mixed doubles	Palau; Ramon Gulla; Jeremai Watanabe	Marshall Islands; Ricky Bokadrik; Annalyn Laikidrik	Palau; D'jud Tamtreng; Aberlynn Ngiruos
Mixed doubles	Palau; Ramon Gulla; Jeremai Watanabe	Marshall Islands; Ricky Bokadrik; Annalyn Laikidrik	Palau; Nena George; Portiana Franz
Men's team	Palau; Ramon Gulla; Shawnessy Soalablai; Samuel Saunders; Nena George; D'jud Tamtreng	Pohnpei; Leonard James; John Thomsin; Jeronimo Thomsin; Antonio Tom	Marshall Islands; Kabuati Bob; Ricky Bokadrik; Keno Kuma
Women's team	Palau; Jeremai Watanabe; Portiana Franz; Aberlynn Ngiruos; Meilin Chin; Jada Osiik	Yap; Viviana Bamtin; Marie E. Dabugfel; Mandiala Gamagag	not awarded

=== Va'a ===
Event	Gold	Silver	Bronze
Men's 500 m	Yap; Travis Bermino; Joseph Bradman; Bruce Chester; Patwin Ervin; Mino Jarguin	Guam; Shane Palomo; Kyle Palomo; Eric Reyes; Jesse Cabrera; Johnny Palomo; Ian Iriarte	Palau; Bill Tony; Majesty Sayad; Joseph Carlos; Jayvits Kiep; Randy Miran; Jimmy Jonas; Denjo Pedro; Cobi Jones; Tino Faatuuala; Jeric Borja
Men's 1500 m	Yap; Travis Bermino; Joseph Bradman; Bruce Chester; Patwin Ervin; Mino Jarguin	Palau; Bill Tony; Majesty Sayad; Joseph Carlos; Jayvits Kiep; Randy Miran; Jimmy Jonas; Denjo Pedro; Cobi Jones; Tino Faatuuala; Jeric Borja	Guam; Shane Palomo; Kyle Palomo; Eric Reyes; Jesse Cabrera; Johnny Palomo; Ian Iriarte
Men's 15 miles	Yap; Bernard Bruce; Joseph Patwin; Ervin Chester	Northern Mariana Islands; Josh Anlyucis; Jose Quian; Bobby Cruz; Maurice Itibus; Jack Kadimel; Diglo Mawhide	Pohnpei; Talley Hairens; Marston Ardos; Iakop Hairens; Mike Hairens; Dexy Hairens; Henry Ardos
Women's 500 m	Palau; Mariah Okada; Elilai Sugiyama; Samantha Rechelluu; Nikla Reddin; Ochebir Ngiraingas; Pkngey Ofobed; Elsei Tellei; Miel Sequeira-Holm; Hatayan Cooper; Nikki Vehara	Kosrae; Kenye Noda; Ann-Marie Killin; Sweetyona Tulensru; Suzie Benjamin; Evelyn Alik; Lorie Ann Alik; Regina Killin; Lolynn Tilfas	Guam; Bel Gutierrez Del Duenas; Jennifer Horeg; Misako Sablan; Taria Manglona; Chrissy Palomo
Women's 1500 m	Palau; Mariah Okada; Elilai Sugiyama; Samantha Rechelluu; Nikla Reddin; Ochebir Ngiraingas; Pkngey Ofobed; Elsei Tellei; Miel Sequeira-Holm; Hatayan Cooper; Nikki Vehara	Guam; Bel Gutierrez Del Duenas; Jennifer Horeg; Misako Sablan; Taria Manglona; Chrissy Palomo	Northern Mariana Islands; Arielle Buyum; Lorenza Aldan; Mayiah Duenas; Maria Ornes; Lei (Elizabeth) Tenorio; Krista Falig; Victoria Camama; Shelli Neal
Women's 10 miles	Palau; Mariah Okada; Elilai Sugiyama; Nikla Reddin; Ochebir Ngiraingas; Pkngey Ofobed; Elsei Tellei; Miel Sequeira-Holm; Hatayan Cooper	Pohnpei; Angie Penikinus; Emerika Loyola; Ariel Yamaguchi; Renselina Akwinas; Sielinda Henrick; Yakida Tudela	Guam; Tavia Manglona; Jennifer Horeg; Maribeth Bonavente; Misako Sablan; Chrissy Palomo; Michele Salas

=== Volleyball ===
Event	Gold	Silver	Bronze
Men	Chuuk	Palau	Kiribati
Women	Guam	Marshall Islands	Palau

=== Weightlifting ===
Men

Event	Gold	Silver	Bronze
56 kg snatch	Mike Riklon; Marshall Islands	Alselm Sumor; Palau	not awarded
56 kg clean & jerk	Mike Riklon; Marshall Islands	Alselm Sumor; Palau	not awarded
56 kg total	Mike Riklon; Marshall Islands	Alselm Sumor; Palau	not awarded
62 kg snatch	Gibbs Jack; Pohnpei	Joshua Ralpho; Marshall Islands	not awarded
62 kg clean & jerk	Joshua Ralpho; Marshall Islands	Gibbs Jack; Pohnpei	not awarded
62 kg total	Joshua Ralpho; Marshall Islands	Gibbs Jack; Pohnpei	not awarded
69 kg snatch	Patterson River; Marshall Islands	Joymar Ioanis; Pohnpei	not awarded
69 kg clean & jerk	Patterson River; Marshall Islands	Joymar Ioanis; Pohnpei	not awarded
69 kg total	Patterson River; Marshall Islands	Joymar Ioanis; Pohnpei	not awarded
77 kg snatch	Loir Tamare; Marshall Islands	Marly Jack; Pohnpei	Brandon Jesse; Kosrae
77 kg clean & jerk	Loir Tamare; Marshall Islands	Marly Jack; Pohnpei	Brandon Jesse; Kosrae
77 kg total	Loir Tamare; Marshall Islands	Marly Jack; Pohnpei	Brandon Jesse; Kosrae
85 kg snatch	Kabuati Sailas Bob; Marshall Islands	Adran Dolon; Pohnpei	Joseph Tudela; Northern Mariana Islands
85 kg clean & jerk	Kabuati Sailas Bob; Marshall Islands	Joseph Tudela; Northern Mariana Islands	Adran Dolon; Pohnpei
85 kg total	Kabuati Sailas Bob; Marshall Islands	Joseph Tudela; Northern Mariana Islands	Adran Dolon; Pohnpei
94 kg snatch	Sione Haho; Marshall Islands	Dorian Peter; Pohnpei	Rodrico Ada; Northern Mariana Islands
94 kg clean & jerk	Sione Haho; Marshall Islands	Rodrico Ada; Northern Mariana Islands	not awarded
94 kg total	Sione Haho; Marshall Islands	Rodrico Ada; Northern Mariana Islands	not awarded
105 kg snatch	Angel San Nicholas; Northern Mariana Islands	Alvin Reuuemau; Yap	not awarded
105 kg clean & jerk	Angel San Nicholas; Northern Mariana Islands	Alvin Reuuemau; Yap	not awarded
105 kg total	Angel San Nicholas; Northern Mariana Islands	Alvin Reuuemau; Yap	not awarded
+105 kg snatch	Burdon Charley; Pohnpei	Abraham Jinuna; Marshall Islands	not awarded
+105 kg clean & jerk	Burdon Charley; Pohnpei	Abraham Jinuna; Marshall Islands	not awarded
+105 kg total	Burdon Charley; Pohnpei	Abraham Jinuna; Marshall Islands	not awarded

Women

Event	Gold	Silver	Bronze
48 kg snatch	Martha Hanerc; Marshall Islands	not awarded	not awarded
48 kg clean & jerk	Martha Hanerc; Marshall Islands	not awarded	not awarded
48 kg total	Martha Hanerc; Marshall Islands	not awarded	not awarded
58 kg snatch	Marine Violet Burns; Marshall Islands	not awarded	not awarded
58 kg clean & jerk	Marine Violet Burns; Marshall Islands	not awarded	not awarded
58 kg total	Marine Violet Burns; Marshall Islands	not awarded	not awarded
69 kg snatch	Daisy Latdrik; Marshall Islands	not awarded	not awarded
69 kg clean & jerk	Daisy Latdrik; Marshall Islands	not awarded	not awarded
69 kg total	Daisy Latdrik; Marshall Islands	not awarded	not awarded
90 kg snatch	Antoinette Labausa; Northern Mariana Islands	Bonnie Cruz; Northern Mariana Islands	not awarded
90 kg clean & jerk	Antoinette Labausa; Northern Mariana Islands	Bonnie Cruz; Northern Mariana Islands	not awarded
90 kg total	Antoinette Labausa; Northern Mariana Islands	Bonnie Cruz; Northern Mariana Islands	not awarded

=== Wrestling ===
Event	Gold	Silver	Bronze
Men's Greco-Roman 55 kg	Joklur Bollong; Marshall Islands	Risky Pretrick; Pohnpei	Frank Sierah; Kosrae
Men's Greco-Roman 60 kg	Jaylen Racheimal; Yap	Mayson Ioannis; Pohnpei	Kaiser Muller; Marshall Islands
Men's Greco-Roman 63 kg	Junjun Asebias; Chuuk	Bercil Timothy; Kosrae	Kaylord Raechemai; Yap
Men's Greco-Roman 67 kg	Cristian Nicolescu; Palau	Mike Kenfield; Kosrae	Nicholas Hashigeitiw; Yap
Men's Greco-Roman 72 kg	Jarvis Tarkong; Palau	Richard Nakasone; Pohnpei	Jefner James; Kosrae
Men's Greco-Roman 77 kg	Guy Delamau; Palau	Thomas Wichilbuch; Yap	John Tulensru; Kosrae
Men's Greco-Roman 82 kg	Damian Myros; Pohnpei	Michael Shinohara; Guam	Mike Kenneth; Kosrae
Men's Greco-Roman 87 kg	Ryan Ifamilik; Pohnpei	Patrick Mike; Kosrae	Isaiah Kramer; Marshall Islands
Men's Greco-Roman 97 kg	Alex Dolon; Pohnpei	Rich Adiniwin; Marshall Islands	not awarded
Men's Greco-Roman 130 kg	Florian Skilang Temengil; Palau	Dukay Tairuwpiy; Yap	not awarded
Men's freestyle 57 kg	Risky Pretrick; Pohnpei	Joklur Bollong; Marshall Islands	Charwin Tawerilmul; Yap
Men's freestyle 61 kg	Junjun Asebias; Chuuk	Mayson Ioannis; Pohnpei	Jaylen Racheimal; Yap
Men's freestyle 65 kg	Cristian Nicolescu; Palau	RD Damian; Pohnpei	Kaylord Raechemai; Yap
Men's freestyle 70 kg	Jarvis Tarkong; Palau	Richard Nakasone; Pohnpei	Nicholas Hashigeitiw; Yap
Men's freestyle 74 kg	Guy Delamau; Palau	Paul Aguon; Guam	Jim McCain; Pohnpei
Men's freestyle 79 kg	John Rojas; Guam	Thomas Wichilbuch; Yap	Skarlee Renguul; Palau
Men's freestyle 86 kg	Michael Shinohara; Guam	Ryan Ifamilik; Pohnpei	Marcel Yatilman; Yap
Men's freestyle 92 kg	Waylon Muller; Marshall Islands	Baker Hairens; Pohnpei	Kenneth Mike; Kosrae
Men's freestyle 97 kg	Alex Dolon; Pohnpei	Rich Adiniwin; Marshall Islands	not awarded
Men's freestyle 125 kg	Florian Skilang Temengil; Palau	Dukay Tairuwpiy; Yap	not awarded
Women's freestyle 57 kg	Rckaela Aquino; Guam	Mayoleen Ioanis; Pohnpei	not awarded
Women's freestyle 59 kg	Mia-Lahnee Aquino; Guam	not awarded	not awarded
Women's freestyle 76 kg	Delvina Kerson; Pohnpei	Louisa Wagthuth; Yap	not awarded
Men's beach wrestling 65 kg	Cristian Nicolescu; Palau	Charwin Tawerilmul; Yap	Mayson Ioannis; Pohnpei
Men's beach wrestling 65 kg	Cristian Nicolescu; Palau	Charwin Tawerilmul; Yap	Kaylord Raechemai; Yap
Men's beach wrestling 80 kg	Guy Delamau; Palau	Thomas Wichilbuch; Yap	Jarvis Tarkong; Palau
Men's beach wrestling 80 kg	Guy Delamau; Palau	Thomas Wichilbuch; Yap	Orlando Barnabas; Pohnpei
Men's beach wrestling +80 kg	Florian Skilang Temengil; Palau	Alex Dolan; Pohnpei	Kenneth Mike; Kosrae
Men's beach wrestling +80 kg	Florian Skilang Temengil; Palau	Alex Dolan; Pohnpei	Dukay Tairuwpiy; Yap
Women's beach wrestling 60 kg	Mayoleen Ioanis; Pohnpei	not awarded	not awarded
Women's beach wrestling +60 kg	Louisa Wagthuth; Yap	Delvina Kerson; Pohnpei	not awarded
