= List of Northern Mariana Islands records in athletics =

The following are the national records in athletics in Northern Mariana Islands maintained by Northern Mariana Islands' national athletics federation: Northern Marianas Athletics (NMA).

== Outdoor ==
Key to tables: Awaiting ratification Record not kept by NMA

=== Men ===
Event	Record	Athlete	Date	Meet	Place	Ref.
100 m	10.99 (−0.2 m/s)	Tyrone Omar	September 4, 2007	Pacific Games	Apia, Samoa	
100 m	10.9 h	Tyrone Omar	March 31, 2007		Susupe, Saipan, Northern Mariana Islands	
200 m	22.40 (+1.6 m/s)	Tyrone Omar	September 6, 2007	Pacific Games	Apia, Samoa	
400 m	52.74	Beouch Ngirchongor	July 2014	Micronesian Games	Palikir, Pohnpei, Federation of Micronesia	
800 m	2:06.88	Ketson Kabiriel	7 August 1998	Micronesian Games	Koror, Palau	
800 m	2:05.70	Landen Taflinger	21 May 2026	Oceanian Championships	Darwin, Australia	
1000 m	2:57.2 h	Glen Núñez	May 3, 1995		Tereora, Cook Islands	
1500 m	4:25.1	Joseph Gildilak	April 1, 1994	Micronesian Games	Mangilao, Guam	
3000 m	10:24.3	Glen Núñez	May 4, 1995	Oceania Youth Championships	Avarua, Cook Islands	
5000 m	16:55.52	Stuart Smith	June 7, 1999	South Pacific Games	Santa Rita, Guam	
10,000 m	36:30.64	Victor Nash Santos	4 July 2025	Pacific Mini Games	Koror, Palau	
Half marathon	1:18:58	Jessy James	July 2014	Micronesian Games	Palikir, Pohnpei, Federation of Micronesia	
Marathon	2:55:31	Yong Choi	14 July 1990	Micronesian Games	San Antonio, Saipan, Northern Mariana Islands	
Marathon	2:44:44 dh (Note: Boston course downhill, but record still ratified.)	Eli Tiergeson	17 April 2006	Boston Marathon	Boston, United States	
Marathon	2:42:26 (Note: not recognised by World Athletics)	Mike Newman	26 March 1983		Mangilao, Guam	
110 m hurdles	17.31	Wayne Pua	July 23, 2002	Micronesian Games	Kolonia, Pohnpei, Federated States of Micronesia	
110 m hurdles	16.8 h	Dexter Dillay	June 25, 2006	Micronesian Games	Susupe, Saipan, Northern Mariana Islands	
400 m hurdles	59.70	Shane Ogumoro	July 22, 2002	Micronesian Games	Kolonia, Pohnpei, Federated States of Micronesia	
3000 m steeplechase	11:45.25	Michael Mancao	May 27, 2011	Saipan National Championship	Susupe, Saipan, Northern Mariana Islands	
High jump	1.95 m	Jeremy Winkfield	May 7, 2005		Susupe, Saipan, Northern Mariana Islands	
Pole vault						
Long jump	6.42 m	Dexter Dillay	December 12, 2006	Oceania Championships	Apia, Samoa	
Triple jump	12.28 m	Ketson Kabiriel	August 5, 1998	Micronesian Games	Koror, Palau	
Shot put	14.47 m	Faaea Talalemotu	November 29, 1996	Oceania Championships	Townsville, Australia	
Discus throw	40.03 m	Faaea Talalemotu	August 3, 1998	Micronesian Games	Koror, Palau	
Hammer throw	28.52 m	Joseph Saures	June 28, 2006	Micronesian Games	Susupe, Northern Mariana Islands	
Javelin throw	59.74 m^{†}	Nick Gross	May 13, 2002	DAC-10 championships	Valley City, North Dakota, United States	
Javelin throw	56.26 m	Nick Gross	December 14, 2005	Micronesian Sub-Regional Championships	Susupe, Saipan, Northern Mariana Islands	
Decathlon						
Decathlon	100m / Long jump / Shot put / High jump / 400m / 110m H / Discus / Pole vault / Javelin / 1500m					
20 km walk (road)						
50 km walk (road)						
4 × 100 m relay	44.78	Northern Mariana Islands; Darrel Roligat; Tyrone Omar; Dexter Dillay; Ben Jones	June 28, 2006	Micronesian Games	Susupe, Saipan, Northern Mariana Islands	
4 × 400 m relay	3:36.52	Northern Mariana Islands; Tony Ichiou; Ketson Kabiriel; John Ogumoro; Robin Eugenio	August 8, 1998	Micronesian Games	Koror, Palau	

^{†}: result obtained as US Citizen prior to arrival on Saipan, Northern Mariana Islands.

=== Women ===
Event	Record	Athlete	Date	Meet	Place	Ref.
100 m	12.37 A (+1.3 m/s)	Yvonne Bennett	April 23, 2011	Springfest Collegiate Shootout	Pocatello, United States	
200 m	24.82 (+1.2 m/s)	Yvonne Bennett	April 27, 2013	Idaho-Utah Border Clash	Nampa, United States	
400 m	56.24	Yvonne Bennett	April 13, 2013	Wildcat Outdoor Invitational	Ogden, United States	
800 m	2:29.70	Jennybree Tollestrup	July 3, 1999		Santa Rita, Guam	
800 m	2:29.24	Kaithlyn Chaves	24 June 2023	Oceania Cup	Saipan, Northern Mariana Islands	
1500 m	5:01.54	Noriko Jim-Nasuhara	June 28, 2006	Micronesian Games	Susupe, Northern Mariana Islands	
3000 m	10:58.76	Nathania Tan	19 March 2022		Stony Brook, United States	
3000 m	10:53.08	Tania Tan	24 June 2023	Oceania Cup	Saipan, Northern Mariana Islands	
5000 m	17:31.19	Nathania Tan	10 May 2025	Portland Twilight	Portland, United States	
10,000 m	39:41.03	Nathania Tan	April 9, 2022	Metropolitan Championships	New York City, United States	
10 km (road)	43:50.2	Noriko Jim	14 March 2020	OAA 10K Championships	Saipan, Northern Mariana Islands	
Half marathon	1:28:40	Nathania Tan	9 July 2025	Pacific Mini Games	Koror, Palau	
Marathon	3:15:19	Mamiko Oshima-Berger	April 16, 2016	Saipan Marathon	Saipan, Northern Mariana Islands	
100 m hurdles	17.50	Rachel Abrams	July 2014	Micronesian Games	Palikir, Pohnpei, Federation of Micronesia	
400 m hurdles	1:12.97	Jacqui Wonenberg	August 4, 2009	Oceania Sub-Regional Championships	Gold Coast, Australia	
3000 m steeplechase						
High jump	1.38 m	Rachel Abrams	July 2014	Micronesian Games	Palikir, Pohnpei, Federation of Micronesia	
Pole vault						
Long jump	4.97 m	Jacqui Wonenberg	May 11/12, 2007		Susupe, Saipan, Northern Mariana Islands	
Triple jump	10.10 m	Jacqui Wonenberg	August 5, 2010	Micronesian Games	Koror, Palau	
Shot put	10.61 m	Emiliana Quitugua	December 15, 1993	South Pacific Mini Games	Port Vila, Vanuatu	
Shot put	11.25 m #	Emiliana Quitugua	May 21, 1981		Mangilao, Guam	
Discus throw	34.98 m	Brenda Haddox	February 22, 1997		Tumon, Guam	
Hammer throw	27.57 m	Jenequa Benavente	June 27, 2008	Oceania Championships	Susupe, Saipan, Northern Mariana Islands	
Javelin throw	35.31 m	Liamwar Rangamar	June 27, 2012	Oceania U20 Championships	Cairns, Australia	
Heptathlon						
Heptathlon	100m H / High jump / Shot put / 200m / Long jump / Javelin / 800m					
20 km walk (road)						
4 × 100 m relay	52.96	Northern Mariana Islands; Reylynn Sapong; Jacqui Wonenberg; Yvette Bennett; Yvonne Bennett	August 6, 2010	Micronesian Games	Koror, Palau	
4 × 400 m relay	4:24.94	Northern Mariana Islands; Jacqui Wonenberg; Yvette Bennett; Liamwar Rangamar; Yvonne Bennett	August 6, 2010	Micronesian Games	Koror, Palau	

^{†}: 12:58.1 by another source.

=== Mixed ===
Event	Record	Athletes	Date	Meet	Place	Ref.
4 × 100 m relay	48.79	Northern Mariana Islands; Alexander Camacho; Theodore Rodgers; Erin Frink; Casey Cruz	24 June 2023	Oceania Cup	Saipan, Northern Mariana Islands	
4 × 400 m relay	4:08.30	Northern Mariana Islands; Cody Shimizu; Douglas Schmidt (Note: by official result and World Athletics sources; Theodore Rodgers by other sources, but unreferenced); Erin Frink; Kaithlyn Chavez	24 June 2023	Oceania Cup	Saipan, Northern Mariana Islands	

== Indoor ==
=== Men ===
Event	Record	Athlete	Date	Meet	Place	Ref.
60 m	7.17	Tyrone Omar	March 10, 2006	World Championships	Moscow, Russia	
200 m
200 m	24.37	Theodore Rodgers	6 December 2025	Mel Tjeerdsma Classic	Maryville, United States	
400 m
400 m	54.68	Simon Tang	6 December 2025	Spartan Holiday Classic	Cleveland, United States	
800 m						
1500 m						
3000 m						
60 m hurdles
60 m hurdles	8.97	Simon Tang	6 December 2025	Spartan Holiday Classic	Cleveland, United States	
High jump						
Pole vault						
Long jump						
Triple jump						
Shot put						
Heptathlon						
Heptathlon	60m / Long jump / Shot put / High jump / 60m H / Pole vault / 1000m					
5000 m walk						
4 × 400 m relay						

=== Women ===
Event	Record	Athlete	Date	Meet	Place	Ref.
60 m	7.88	Yvette Bennett	25 January 2013	Jackson's Invitational	Nampa, United States	
200 m	24.69 (Note: outdoor mark ratified as absolute record)	Yvette Bennett	8 February 2013	Mountain West Championships	Nampa, United States	
400 m	57.02	Yvette Bennett	2 February 2013	Bronco Classic	Nampa, United States	
800 m						
1500 m						
Mile	6:02.33	Nathania Tan	21 February 2020	Armory Last Chance	New York City, United States	
3000 m	10:18.81	Nathania Tan	10 February 2023	BU David Hemery Valentine Invitational	Boston, United States	
5000 m	18:52.21	Nathania Tan	4 February 2022	Metropolitan Championship	Staten Island, United States	
60 m hurdles						
High jump						
Pole vault						
Long jump						
Triple jump						
Shot put						
Pentathlon						
Pentathlon	60m H / High jump / Shot put / Long jump / 800m					
3000 m walk						
4 × 400 m relay						
