= Northern Mariana Islands at the 2023 World Athletics Championships =

- Flag of the Northern Mariana Islands
- WA code: NMI

in Budapest, Hungary 19 August 2023 – 27 August 2023
- Competitors: 1 (0 men and 1 woman)
- Medals: Gold 0 Silver 0 Bronze 0 Total 0

World Athletics Championships appearances
- 1991; 1993; 1995; 1997; 1999; 2001; 2003; 2005; 2007; 2009; 2011; 2013; 2015; 2017; 2019; 2022; 2023; 2025

The Northern Mariana Islands competed at the 2023 World Athletics Championships in Budapest, Hungary, which were held from 19 to 27 August 2023. The athlete delegation of the country was composed of one competitor, sprinter Zarinae Sapong who would compete in the women's 100 metres. She qualified upon being selected by the Aruba Athletic Federation. Sapong placed eighth in her heat out of the eight competitors that competed in her heat and did not advance to the semifinals.

== Background ==
The 2023 World Athletics Championships in Budapest, Hungary, were held from 19 to 27 August 2023. The Championships were held at the National Athletics Centre. To qualify for the World Championships, athletes had to reach an entry standard (e.g. time or distance), place in a specific position at select competitions, be a wild card entry, or qualify through their World Athletics Ranking at the end of the qualification period.

As the Northern Mariana Islands did not meet any of the four standards, they could send either one male or one female athlete in one event of the Championships who has not yet qualified. The Northern Marianas Athletics selected sprinter Zarinae Sapong who had already competed in three previous editions of the World Athletics Championships representing the territory.

== Results ==
Key

- Q = Qualified for the next round
- q = Qualified for the next round as a fastest loser or, in field events, by position without achieving the qualifying target
- NR = National record
- PB = Personal best
- SB = Season best
- N/A = Round not applicable for the event

=== Women ===
Sapong competed in the heats of the women's 100 metres on 20 August against seven other competitors. She raced in the first heat and recorded a time of 13.04 seconds for a new season's best. She would place last in her heat and would not advance further to the semifinals.

Track and road events

Athlete	Event	Heat		Semifinal		Final	
Athlete	Event	Result	Rank	Result	Rank	Result	Rank
Zarinae Sapong	100 metres	13.04 SB	8	Did not advance			
