= Northern Mariana Islands at the 2025 World Aquatics Championships =

- Flag of Northern Mariana Islands
- World Aquatics code: NMI
- National federation: Northern Mariana Islands Swimming Federation
- Website: nmiswimmingfederation.org

in Singapore
- Competitors: 4 in 1 sport
- Medals: Gold 0 Silver 0 Bronze 0 Total 0

World Aquatics Championships appearances
- 1973; 1975; 1978; 1982; 1986; 1991; 1994; 1998; 2001; 2003; 2005; 2007; 2009; 2011; 2013; 2015; 2017; 2019; 2022; 2023; 2024; 2025

Northern Mariana Islands is competing at the 2025 World Aquatics Championships in Singapore from 11 July to 3 August 2025.

== Competitors ==
The following is the list of competitors in the Championships.

Sport	Men	Women	Total
Swimming	2	2	4
Total	2	2	4

== Swimming ==
Men

Athlete	Event	Heat		Semifinal		Final	
Athlete	Event	Time	Rank	Time	Rank	Time	Rank
Michael Miller	50 m freestyle	25.28	88	Did not advance			
Michael Miller	50 m butterfly	27.64	86	Did not advance			
Kouki Watanabe	50 m breaststroke	31.36	70	Did not advance			
Kouki Watanabe	100 m breaststroke	1:08.90	68	Did not advance			

Women

Athlete	Event	Heat		Semifinal		Final	
Athlete	Event	Time	Rank	Time	Rank	Time	Rank
Maria Batallones	50 m breaststroke	34.53	45	Did not advance			
Maria Batallones	100 m breaststroke	1:17.38	54	Did not advance			
Piper Raho	50 m backstroke	31.76	52	Did not advance			
Piper Raho	200 m backstroke	2:38.43	42	Did not advance			

Mixed

Athlete	Event	Heat		Final	
Athlete	Event	Time	Rank	Time	Rank
Maria Batallones; Michael Miller; Piper Raho; Kouki Watanabe	4 × 100 m freestyle relay	4:01.29	30	Did not advance	
Maria Batallones; Michael Miller; Piper Raho; Kouki Watanabe	4 × 100 m medley relay	4:27.88	33	Did not advance	
