= Northern Mariana Islands at the 2022 World Athletics Championships =

- Flag of the Northern Mariana Islands
- WA code: NMI

in Eugene, United States 15 July 2022 – 24 July 2022
- Competitors: 1 (1 woman)
- Medals: Gold 0 Silver 0 Bronze 0 Total 0

World Athletics Championships appearances
- 1991; 1993; 1995; 1997; 1999; 2001; 2003; 2005; 2007; 2009; 2011; 2013; 2015; 2017; 2019; 2022; 2023; 2025

The Northern Mariana Islands competed at the 2022 World Athletics Championships in Eugene, Oregon, United States, which were held from 15 to 24 July 2022. The athlete delegation of the territory was composed of one competitor, sprinter Zarinae Sapong. She competed in the preliminary heats of the women's 100 metres and placed last in her heat with a time of 12.98 seconds, failing to advance further to the semifinals.

== Background ==
The 2022 World Athletics Championships in Eugene, Oregon, United States, were held from 15 to 24 July 2022. To qualify for the World Championships, athletes had to reach an entry standard (e.g. time and distance), place in a specific position at select competitions, be a wild card entry, or qualify through their World Athletics Ranking at the end of the qualification period.

As the Northern Mariana Islands did not meet any of the four standards, they could send either one male or one female athlete in one event of the Championships who has not yet qualified. Northern Marianas Athletics selected sprinter Zarinae Sapong, who would compete in the women's 100 metres. Previously, Sapong had competed for the territory in two previous editions of the World Championships. In the lead-up to the Championships, she had sustained an injury.

== Results ==
Key

- Q = Qualified for the next round
- q = Qualified for the next round as a fastest loser or, in field events, by position without achieving the qualifying target
- NR = National record
- PB = Personal best
- SB = Season best
- N/A = Round not applicable for the event

=== Women ===
Sapong competed in the sixth preliminary heat of the event on 16 July against six other sprinters. There, she recorded a time of 12.98 seconds and placed last, failing to advance further to the semifinals as only the top three of each heat and the three next fastest would only be able to do so. Despite this, Sapong recorded a new personal best in the distance.

Track and road events

Athlete	Event	Heat		Semi-final		Final	
Athlete	Event	Result	Rank	Result	Rank	Result	Rank
Zarinae Sapong	100 metres	12.98 PB	46	did not advance			
