= 2022 World Athletics Championships – Men's 1500 metres =

Men's 1500 metres at the 2022 World Championships
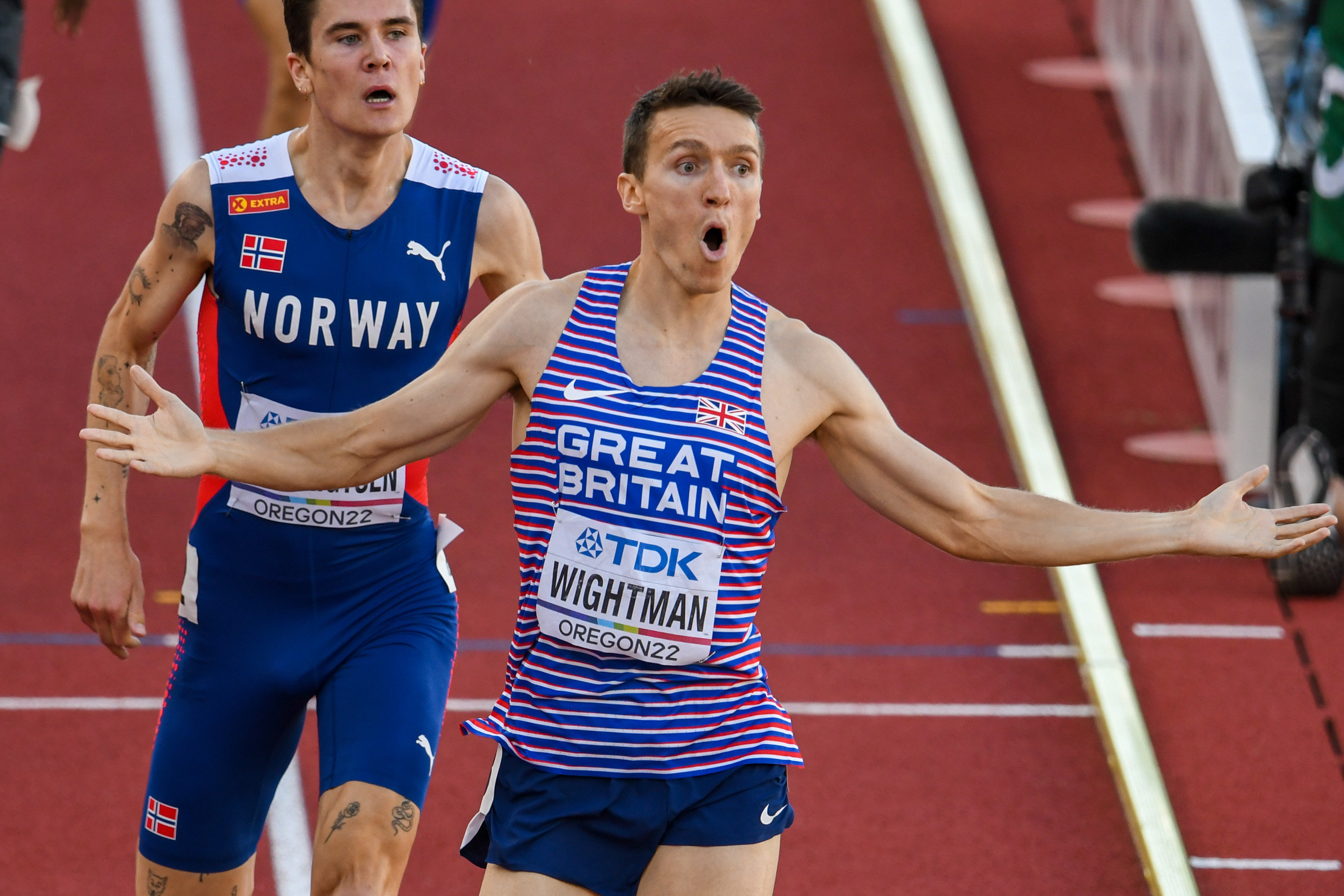
- Wightman after crossing the finish line
- Venue: Hayward Field
- Dates: 16 July (heats); 17 July (semi-finals); 19 July (final)
- Competitors: 46 from 25 nations
- Winning time: 3:29.23

Medalists
gold medal	Jake Wightman	Great Britain
silver medal	Jakob Ingebrigtsen	Norway
bronze medal	Mohamed Katir	Spain

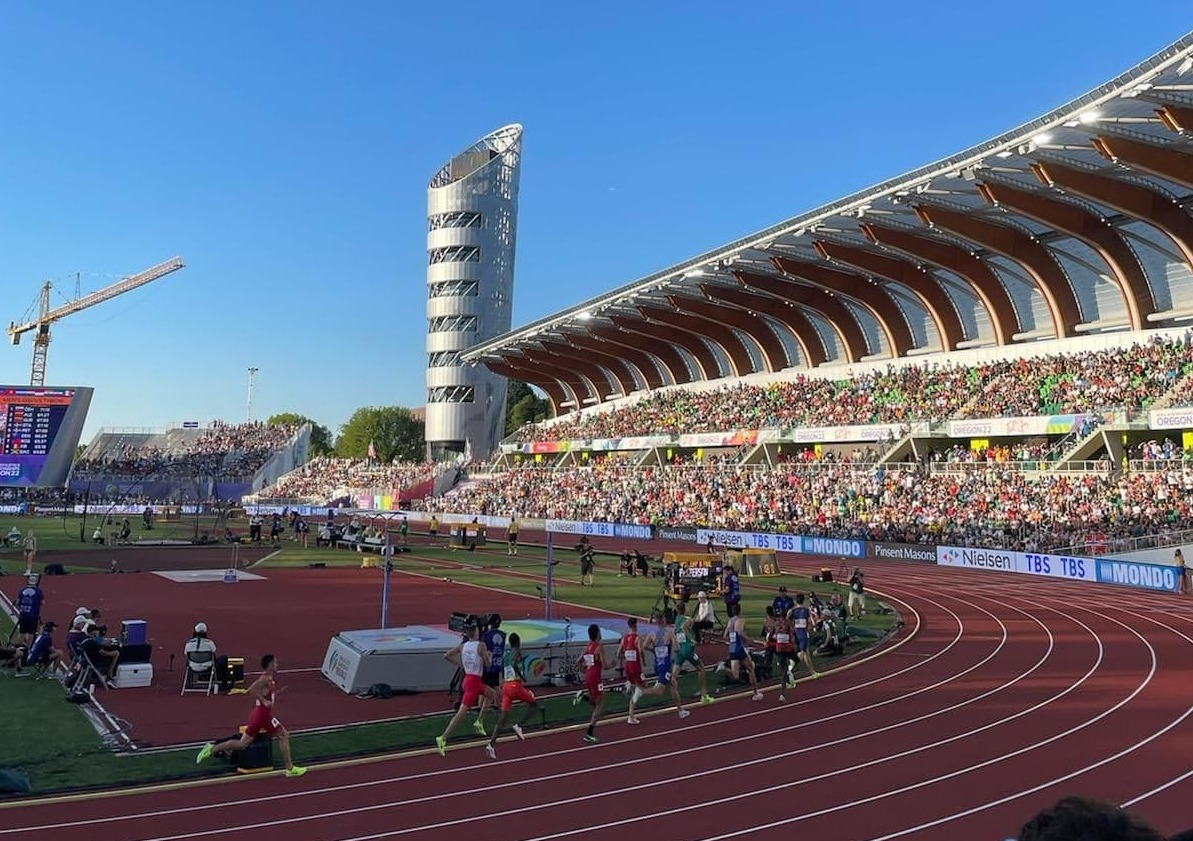
1500 meter men's final at the 2022 World Athletics Championships

The men's 1500 metres at the 2022 World Athletics Championships was held at the Hayward Field in Eugene from 16 to 19 July 2022. The winning margin was 0.24 seconds.

== Summary ==
Right from the start, Abel Kipsang went to the front to keep the pace honest. Josh Thompson moved in to follow until Stewart McSweyn took the second position. They completed the first lap in 55.5. When defending champion Timothy Cheruiyot moved up to join his Kenyan teammate, Olympic Champion Jakob Ingebrigtsen took that seriously and followed. The second time down the home stretch, Ingebrigtsen cruised past the Kenyans into the lead. Cheruiyot marked Ingebrigtsen, with British runners Jake Wightman and Josh Kerr moving toward the front. By the bell the two Spaniards Mohamed Katir and Mario García Romo had come up to behind the Brits. Three teams cued up behind Ingebrigtsen. On the rail, Wightman traded elbows with Kipsang boxing him to the outside. With 300 to go, Wightman accelerated past Cheruiyot to Ingebrigtsen's shoulder. With 200 to go, Wightman went for it, passing Ingebrigtsen at the start of the turn. It opened into little more than a metre gap, but all the way down the homestretch, Ingebrigtsen was unable to close it. Behind them, Katir came through on the rail, also trading elbows with Cheruiyot before breaking free, drifting to the outside. Wightman beat Ingebrigtsen to the line to complete the upset. Katir trailed them by 3 metres in for bronze.

Wightman's victory was called for the fans in attendance as usual by the stadium commentator. Uniquely, on this occasion that also happened to be the gold medalist's coach and father, Geoff Wightman.

== Records ==
Before the competition records were as follows:

Record	Athlete & Nat.	Perf.	Location	Date
World record	Hicham El Guerrouj (MAR)	3:26.00	Rome, Italy	14 July 1998
Championship record	Hicham El Guerrouj (MAR)	3:27.65	Seville, Spain	24 August 1999
World Leading	Abel Kipsang (KEN)	3:31.01	Nairobi, Kenya	7 May 2022
African Record	Hicham El Guerrouj (MAR)	3:26.00	Rome, Italy	14 July 1998
Asian Record	Rashid Ramzi (BHR)	3:29.14	Rome, Italy	14 July 2006
North, Central American and Caribbean record	Bernard Lagat (USA)	3:29.30	Rieti, Italy	28 August 2005
South American Record	Hudson Santos de Souza (BRA)	3:33.25	Rieti, Italy	28 August 2005
European Record	Jakob Ingebrigtsen (NOR)	3:28.32	Tokyo, Japan	6 August 2021
Oceanian record	Stewart McSweyn (AUS)	3:29.51	Monte Carlo, Monaco	9 July 2021

The following records were set at the competition:

Record	Perf.	Athlete	Nat.	Date
World Leading	3:29.23	Jake Wightman	GBR	19 Jul 2022

== Qualification standard ==
The standard to qualify automatically for entry was 3:35.00.

== Schedule ==
The event schedule, in local time (UTC−7), was as follows:

Date	Time	Round
16 July	18:30	Heats
17 July	19:00	Semi-finals
19 July	19:30	Final

== Results ==
The first six in each heat (Q) and the next six fastest (q) qualify for the semi-finals.

=== Heats ===
Rank	Heat	Name	Nationality	Time	Notes
1	2	Stewart McSweyn	Australia	3:34.91	Q, SB
2	2	Charles Philibert-Thiboutot	Canada	3:35.02	Q, SB
3	2	Jakob Ingebrigtsen	Norway	3:35.12	Q
4	2	Jake Wightman	Great Britain & N.I.	3:35.31	Q
5	2	Mario García Romo	Spain	3:35.43	Q, PB
6	2	John Gregorek Jr.	United States	3:35.65	Q
7	2	Santiago Catrofe	Uruguay	3:35.86	q, SB
8	1	Olli Hoare	Australia	3:36.17	Q
9	2	Teddese Lemi	Ethiopia	3:36.24	q
10	1	Samuel Tefera	Ethiopia	3:36.35	Q
11	1	Andrew Coscoran	Ireland	3:36.36	Q, SB
12	1	Timothy Cheruiyot	Kenya	3:36.41	Q
13	2	Kumari Taki	Kenya	3:36.47	q
14	1	Charles Grethen	Luxembourg	3:36.51	Q
15	1	Neil Gourley	Great Britain & N.I.	3:36.54	Q
16	1	Ignacio Fontes	Spain	3:36.69	q
17	1	Michał Rozmys	Poland	3:36.76	q
18	1	Cameron Proceviat	Canada	3:37.43	q
19	1	Christoph Kessler	Germany	3:37.57	
20	2	Charles Simotwo	Kenya	3:37.66	
21	1	Abdellatif Sadiki	Morocco	3:37.76	
22	2	Anass Essayi	Morocco	3:38.60	SB
23	3	Josh Kerr	Great Britain & N.I.	3:38.94	Q
24	3	Joshua Thompson	United States	3:39.10	Q
25	1	Ryan Mphahlele	South Africa	3:39.17	
26	3	Abel Kipsang	Kenya	3:39.21	Q
27	3	William Paulson	Canada	3:39.21	Q
28	3	Samuel Tanner	New Zealand	3:39.33	Q
29	3	Mohamed Katir	Spain	3:39.45	Q
30	3	Ruben Verheyden	Belgium	3:39.46	
31	3	Filip Sasínek	Czech Republic	3:39.47	
32	3	Matthew Ramsden	Australia	3:39.83	
33	3	Ferdinand Kvan Edman	Norway	3:39.92	
34	2	Ismael Debjani	Belgium	3:39.96	
35	3	Elhassane Moujahid	Morocco	3:39.98	
36	3	Samuel Zeleke	Ethiopia	3:40.77	
37	3	Ronald Musagala	Uganda	3:40.87	
38	1	Cooper Teare	United States	3:41.15	
39	3	Yervand Mkrtchyan	Armenia	3:42.37	
40	2	Isaac Nader	Portugal	3:42.81	
41	1	Abraham Guem	South Sudan	3:43.47	
	2	Thiago André	Brazil		DNS

=== Semi-finals ===
The first five in each heat (Q) and the next two fastest (q) qualify for the final.

Rank	Heat	Name	Nationality	Time	Notes
1	2	Abel Kipsang	Kenya	3:33.68	Q
2	2	Mohamed Katir	Spain	3:34.45	Q, SB
3	2	Jake Wightman	Great Britain & N.I.	3:34.48	Q
4	2	Teddese Lemi	Ethiopia	3:35.04	Q
5	2	Stewart McSweyn	Australia	3:35.07	Q
6	2	Michał Rozmys	Poland	3:35.27	q, SB
7	2	Joshua Thompson	United States	3:35.55	q, SB
8	2	Samuel Tanner	New Zealand	3:36.32	
9	1	Josh Kerr	Great Britain & N.I.	3:36.92	Q
10	1	Mario García Romo	Spain	3:37.01	Q
11	1	Jakob Ingebrigtsen	Norway	3:37.02	Q
12	1	Timothy Cheruiyot	Kenya	3:37.04	Q
13	1	Ignacio Fontes	Spain	3:37.21	Q
14	1	Neil Gourley	Great Britain & N.I.	3:37.22	
15	1	Charles Philibert-Thiboutot	Canada	3:37.29	
16	1	John Gregorek Jr.	United States	3:37.35	
17	1	Samuel Tefera	Ethiopia	3:37.71	
18	1	Ollie Hoare	Australia	3:38.36	
19	2	Cameron Proceviat	Canada	3:38.83	
20	2	Santiago Catrofe	Uruguay	3:40.16	
21	1	Charles Grethen	Luxembourg	3:40.41	
21	2	William Paulson	Canada	3:40.41	
23	1	Andrew Coscoran	Ireland	3:44.66	
24	2	Kumari Taki	Kenya	3:50.15	

=== Final ===
The final took place on 19 July at 19:30.

Rank	Name	Nationality	Time	Notes
1st place, gold medalist(s)	Jake Wightman	Great Britain & N.I.	3:29.23	
2nd place, silver medalist(s)	Jakob Ingebrigtsen	Norway	3:29.47	
3rd place, bronze medalist(s)	Mohamed Katir	Spain	3:29.90	
4	Mario García	Spain	3:30.20	
5	Josh Kerr	Great Britain & N.I.	3:30.60	
6	Timothy Cheruiyot	Kenya	3:30.69	
7	Abel Kipsang	Kenya	3:31.21	
8	Teddese Lemi	Ethiopia	3:32.98	
9	Stewart McSweyn	Australia	3:33.24	
10	Michał Rozmys	Poland	3:34.58	
11	Ignacio Fontes	Spain	3:34.71	
12	Joshua Thompson	United States	3:35.57	
