= Northern Mariana Islands at the 2022 World Aquatics Championships =

- Flag of the Northern Mariana Islands
- World Aquatics code: NMI
- National federation: Northern Mariana Islands Swimming Federation

in Budapest, Hungary
- Competitors: 4 in 1 sport
- Medals: Gold 0 Silver 0 Bronze 0 Total 0

World Aquatics Championships appearances
- 1973; 1975; 1978; 1982; 1986; 1991; 1994; 1998; 2001; 2003; 2005; 2007; 2009; 2011; 2013; 2015; 2017; 2019; 2022; 2023; 2024; 2025

The Northern Mariana Islands competed at the 2022 World Aquatics Championships in Budapest, Hungary from 17 June to 3 July.

== Swimming ==
Northern Mariana Islands entered four swimmers.

Men

Athlete	Event	Heat		Semifinal		Final	
Athlete	Event	Time	Rank	Time	Rank	Time	Rank
Taiyo Akimaru	50 m freestyle	26.02	76	did not advance			
Taiyo Akimaru	50 metre butterfly	27.85	64	did not advance			
Juhn Tenorio	50 m backstroke	28.18	41	did not advance			
Juhn Tenorio	100 m backstroke	1:00.93	41	did not advance			

Women

Athlete	Event	Heat		Semifinal		Final	
Athlete	Event	Time	Rank	Time	Rank	Time	Rank
Maria Batallones	50 m breaststroke	37.77	=50	did not advance			
Maria Batallones	100 m breaststroke	1:26.01	52	did not advance			
Jinie Thompson	50 m freestyle	31.36	74	did not advance			
Jinie Thompson	100 m freestyle	1:10.31	58	did not advance			

Mixed

Athlete	Event	Heat		Final	
Athlete	Event	Time	Rank	Time	Rank
Taiyo Akimaru; Maria Batallones; Juhn Tenorio; Jinie Thompson	4 × 100 m freestyle relay	4:12.95	25	did not advance	
Taiyo Akimaru; Maria Batallones; Juhn Tenorio; Jinie Thompson	4×100 m medley relay	4:37.91	26	did not advance	
