= Northern Mariana Islands at the 2013 World Aquatics Championships =

- Flag of the Northern Mariana Islands
- World Aquatics code: NMI
- National federation: Northern Mariana Islands Swimming Federation

in Barcelona, Spain
- Competitors: 4 in 1 sports
- Medals: Gold 0 Silver 0 Bronze 0 Total 0

World Aquatics Championships appearances
- 1973; 1975; 1978; 1982; 1986; 1991; 1994; 1998; 2001; 2003; 2005; 2007; 2009; 2011; 2013; 2015; 2017; 2019; 2022; 2023; 2024; 2025

Northern Mariana Islands competed at the 2013 World Aquatics Championships in Barcelona, Spain between 19 July and 4 August 2013.

== Swimming ==
Swimmers from the Northern Mariana Islands achieved qualifying standards in the following events (up to a maximum of 2 swimmers in each event at the A-standard entry time, and 1 at the B-standard):

Men

Athlete	Event	Heat		Semifinal		Final	
Athlete	Event	Time	Rank	Time	Rank	Time	Rank
Kensuke Kimura	50 m butterfly	28.01	69	did not advance			
Kensuke Kimura	100 m butterfly	1:02.79	55	did not advance			
Eli Ebenezer Wong	200 m breaststroke	2:23.75	41	did not advance			
Eli Ebenezer Wong	200 m individual medley	2:09.59	48	did not advance			

Women

Athlete	Event	Heat		Semifinal		Final	
Athlete	Event	Time	Rank	Time	Rank	Time	Rank
Victoria Chentsova	400 m freestyle	4:59.78	37	—N/a		did not advance	
Victoria Chentsova	800 m freestyle	10:14.63	38	—N/a		did not advance	
Angel de Jesus	50 m freestyle	31.01	73	did not advance			
Angel de Jesus	50 m butterfly	34.82	59	did not advance			
