= Northern Mariana Islands at the 2017 World Aquatics Championships =

- Flag of the Northern Mariana Islands
- World Aquatics code: NMI
- National federation: Northern Mariana Islands Swimming Federation

in Budapest, Hungary
- Competitors: 4 in 1 sport
- Medals: Gold 0 Silver 0 Bronze 0 Total 0

World Aquatics Championships appearances
- 1973; 1975; 1978; 1982; 1986; 1991; 1994; 1998; 2001; 2003; 2005; 2007; 2009; 2011; 2013; 2015; 2017; 2019; 2022; 2023; 2024; 2025

The Northern Mariana Islands competed at the 2017 World Aquatics Championships in Budapest, Hungary from 14 July to 30 July.

== Swimming ==
Northern Mariana Islands has received a Universality invitation from FINA to send a maximum of four swimmers (two men and two women) to the World Championships.

Athlete	Event	Heat		Semifinal		Final	
Athlete	Event	Time	Rank	Time	Rank	Time	Rank
David Roberto	Men's 100 m freestyle	1:01.18	108	did not advance			
David Roberto	Men's 100 m butterfly	1:06.80	71	did not advance			
Christian Villacrusis	Men's 50 m freestyle	26.61	107	did not advance			
Christian Villacrusis	Men's 100 m breaststroke	1:16.70	72	did not advance			
Victoria Chentsova	Women's 400 m freestyle	4:47.15	36	—N/a		did not advance	
Victoria Chentsova	Women's 100 m backstroke	1:14.32	55	did not advance			
Jin Ju Thompson	Women's 100 m freestyle	1:12.07	76	did not advance			
Jin Ju Thompson	Women's 200 m freestyle	2:36.47	52	did not advance			
