= Canada at the 2022 World Athletics Championships =

Canada at the 2022 World Championships in Athletics
- WA code: CAN
- National federation: Athletics Canada
- Website: www.athletics.ca

in Eugene, Oregon, United States
- Competitors: 59 (25 men and 34 women)
- Medals Ranked 9th: Gold 1 Silver 2 Bronze 1 Total 4

World Championships in Athletics appearances (overview)
- 1976; 1980; 1983; 1987; 1991; 1993; 1995; 1997; 1999; 2001; 2003; 2005; 2007; 2009; 2011; 2013; 2015; 2017; 2019; 2022; 2023; 2025

Canada is scheduled to compete at the 2022 World Championships in Athletics in Eugene, Oregon, United States, from July 15−24, 2022.

The Canadian team of 54 athletes (24 men and 30 women) was named on June 30, 2022. In July, five more athletes were named to the team (Cameron Proceviat, Catherine Léger, Gracelyn Larkin, Grace Fetherstonhaugh and Anicka Newell) after invitations from World Athletics. This meant the final team size was 59 athletes (25 men and 34 women).

Canada finished the event with four medals (one gold, two silver and one bronze), including a new national record and gold medal win in the 4x100 relay for men, 25 years after the last major win for the team at the 1996 Summer Olympics in Atlanta. The Canadian team also finished seventh overall in the placement table, with a total of 63 points, bettering its performance from 2019 (55 points and ninth overall).

== Medallists ==
Medal	Athlete	Event	Date
Gold	Jerome Blake; Aaron Brown; Andre De Grasse; Brendon Rodney	Men's 4 × 100 m relay	24 July
Silver	Camryn Rogers	Women's hammer throw	17 July
Silver	Pierce LePage	Men's decathlon	24 July
Bronze	Marco Arop	Men's 800 metres	24 July

== Results ==
Key

- Note–Ranks given for track events are within the athlete's heat only
- Q = Qualified for the next round
- q = Qualified for the next round as a fastest loser or, in field events, by position without achieving the qualifying target
- NR = National record
- PB = Personal best
- N/A = Round not applicable for the event
- Bye = Athlete not required to compete in round

=== Men ===
Malachi Murray and Benjamin Williams did not compete (both were named to the 4x100 relay team).

Track and road events

Athlete	Event	Heat		Semifinal		Final	
Athlete	Event	Result	Rank	Result	Rank	Result	Rank
Aaron Brown	100 metres	10.06 SB	3 Q	10.06	3 q	10.07	8
Jerome Blake	100 metres	10.16	4	did not advance			
Andre De Grasse	100 metres	10.12	2 Q	10.21	5	did not advance	
Jerome Blake	200 metres	20.30	3 Q	20.29	3	did not advance	
Aaron Brown	200 metres	20.60	2 Q	20.10	2 Q	20.18	7
Andre De Grasse	200 metres	DNS		did not advance			
Marco Arop	800 metres	1:44.56	1 Q	1:45.12	2 Q	1:44.28	3rd place, bronze medalist(s)
Brandon McBride	800 metres	1:57.43	8	did not advance			
William Paulson	1500 metres	3:39.21	4 Q	3:40.41	11	did not advance	
Charles Philibert-Thiboutot	1500 metres	3:35.02	2 Q	3:37.29	7	did not advance	
Cameron Proceviat	1500 metres	3:37.43	9 q	3:38.83	9	did not advance	
Mohammed Ahmed	5000 metres	13:15.17	5 Q	—N/a		13:10.46	6
Charles Philibert-Thiboutot	5000 metres	13:38.80	15	—N/a		did not advance	
Mohammed Ahmed	10,000 metres	—N/a				27:30.27	6
Cameron Levins	Marathon	—N/a				2:07.9 NR	4
Rory Linkletter	Marathon	—N/a				2:10.24	20
Ben Preisner	Marathon	—N/a				2:11.47	28
Malik Metivier	400 metres hurdles	did not start					
Jean-Simon Desgagnés	3000 metres steeplechase	8:40.90	12	—N/a		did not advance	
John Gay	3000 metres steeplechase	8:27.02	8	—N/a		did not advance	
Ryan Smeeton	3000 metres steeplechase	8:33.51	12	—N/a		did not advance	
Evan Dunfee	35 kilometres walk	—N/a				2:25:02 AR	6
Jerome Blake; Aaron Brown; Andre De Grasse; Brendon Rodney	4 × 100 m relay	38.10	2 Q	—N/a		37.48 WL, NR	1st place, gold medalist(s)

Field events

Athlete	Event	Qualification		Final	
Athlete	Event	Distance	Position	Distance	Position
Django Lovett	High jump	2.28 =SB	=1 q	2.27	6
Rowan Hamilton	Hammer throw	74.02	17	did not advance	
Adam Keenan	Hammer throw	74.44	13	did not advance	

Combined events – Decathlon

Athlete	Event	100 m	LJ	SP	HJ	400 m	110H	DT	PV	JT	1500 m	Final	Rank
Damian Warner	Result	10.27	7.87	14.99 SB	2.05 SB	DNF	DNF					DNF	DNF
Damian Warner	Points	1030	1027	789	850	0	DNF					DNF	DNF
Pierce Lepage	Result	10.39	7.54 SB	14.83	1.99 SB	46.84 PB	13.78 PB	53.26 PB	5.00 SB	57.52 SB	4:42.77 SB	8701	2nd place, silver medalist(s)
Pierce Lepage	Points	1001	945	779	794	966	1003	939	910	701	663	8701	2nd place, silver medalist(s)

=== Women ===
Sade McCreath and Makenzy Pierre-Webster did not compete.

Track and road events

Athlete	Event	Heat		Semifinal		Final	
Athlete	Event	Result	Rank	Result	Rank	Result	Rank
Khamica Bingham	100 metres	11.30	4	did not advance			
Crystal Emmanuel	100 metres	11.48	6	did not advance			
Lauren Gale	200 metres	23.08	4	did not advance			
Catherine Léger	200 metres	23.35	5	did not advance			
Lauren Gale	400 metres	52.46	5	did not advance			
Natassha McDonald	400 metres	52.41	5	did not advance			
Aiyanna Stiverne	400 metres	53.07	6	did not advance			
Lindsey Butterworth	800 metres	2:00.81	4 q	2:01.39	7	did not advance	
Madeleine Kelly	800 metres	2:02.71	6	did not advance			
Addy Townsend	800 metres	2:03.79	7	did not advance			
Natalia Hawthorn	1500 metres	4:07.37	13	did not advance			
Lucia Stafford	1500 metres	4:09.67	10	did not advance			
Gracelyn Larkin	5000 metres	16:48.78	19	—N/a		did not advance	
Elissa Legault	Marathon	—N/a				2:37:35	27
Kinsey Middleton	Marathon	—N/a				2:32:56	26
Leslie Sexton	Marathon	—N/a				2:28:52 SB	13
Michelle Harrison	100 metres hurdles	12.95	2 Q	12.74	4	did not advance	
Grace Fetherstonhaugh	3000 metres steeplechase	9:49.85	13	—N/a		did not advance	
Ceili McCabe	3000 metres steeplechase	9:32.73	10	—N/a		did not advance	
Regan Yee	3000 metres steeplechase	9:36.22	9	—N/a		did not advance	
Khamica Bingham; Leya Buchanan; Crystal Emmanuel; Jacqueline Madogo	4 × 100 m relay	43.09	5	—N/a		did not advance	
Kyra Constantine; Natassha McDonald; Zoe Sherar; Aiyanna Stiverne; Micha Powell*	4 × 400 m relay	3:28.49 SB	3 Q	—N/a		3:25.18 SB	4

- Ran in heat only

Field events

Athlete	Event	Qualification		Final	
Athlete	Event	Distance	Position	Distance	Position
Anicka Newell	Pole vault	4.50 SB	=10 q	4.45	9
Alysha Newman	Pole vault	4.35	=16	did not advance	
Christabel Nettey	Long jump	6.50	17	did not advance	
Sarah Mitton	Shot put	19.38	2 Q	19.77	4
Trinity Tutti	Discus throw	54.36	15	did not advance	
Camryn Rogers	Hammer throw	73.67	4 Q	75.52	2nd place, silver medalist(s)
Jillian Weir	Hammer throw	72.00	9 q	72.41	5
Liz Gleadle	Javelin throw	60.38	3 q	59.59	9

== See also ==
- Canada at the 2022 World Aquatics Championships
- Canada at the 2022 Commonwealth Games
