= Northern Mariana Islands at the 2019 World Aquatics Championships =

- Flag of the Northern Mariana Islands
- World Aquatics code: NMI
- National federation: Northern Mariana Islands Swimming Federation

in Gwangju, South Korea
- Competitors: 4 in 1 sport
- Medals: Gold 0 Silver 0 Bronze 0 Total 0

World Aquatics Championships appearances
- 1973; 1975; 1978; 1982; 1986; 1991; 1994; 1998; 2001; 2003; 2005; 2007; 2009; 2011; 2013; 2015; 2017; 2019; 2022; 2023; 2024; 2025

The Northern Mariana Islands competed at the 2019 World Aquatics Championships in Gwangju, South Korea from 12 to 28 July.

== Swimming ==
Northern Mariana Islands entered four swimmers.

Men

Athlete	Event	Heat		Semifinal		Final	
Athlete	Event	Time	Rank	Time	Rank	Time	Rank
Lennosuke Suzuki	100 m freestyle	57.83	107	did not advance			
Lennosuke Suzuki	100 m breaststroke	1:20.97	86	did not advance			
Juhn Tenorio	50 m backstroke	29.42	63	did not advance			
Juhn Tenorio	100 m backstroke	1:04.91	61	did not advance			

Women

Athlete	Event	Heat		Semifinal		Final	
Athlete	Event	Time	Rank	Time	Rank	Time	Rank
Jin Ju Thompson	100 m freestyle	1:10.31	87	did not advance			
Jin Ju Thompson	200 m freestyle	2:32.35	60	did not advance			
Aika Watanabe	50 m backstroke	35.04	42	did not advance			
Aika Watanabe	50 m butterfly	33.43	59	did not advance			

Mixed

Athlete	Event	Heat		Final	
Athlete	Event	Time	Rank	Time	Rank
Juhn Tenorio; Lennosuke Suzuki; Aika Watanabe; Jin Ju Thompson	4×100 m medley relay	4:56.20	35	did not advance	
