= Northern Mariana Islands at the 2023 World Aquatics Championships =

- Flag of the Northern Mariana Islands
- World Aquatics code: NMI
- National federation: Northern Mariana Islands Swimming Federation
- Website: nmiswimmingfederation.org

in Fukuoka, Japan
- Competitors: 4 in 1 sport
- Medals: Gold 0 Silver 0 Bronze 0 Total 0

World Aquatics Championships appearances
- 1973; 1975; 1978; 1982; 1986; 1991; 1994; 1998; 2001; 2003; 2005; 2007; 2009; 2011; 2013; 2015; 2017; 2019; 2022; 2023; 2024; 2025

Northern Mariana Islands is set to compete at the 2023 World Aquatics Championships in Fukuoka, Japan from 14 to 30 July.

== Swimming ==
Northern Mariana Islands entered 4 swimmers.

Men

Athlete	Event	Heat		Semifinal		Final	
Athlete	Event	Time	Rank	Time	Rank	Time	Rank
Isaiah Aleksenko	50 metre backstroke	26.94	47	Did not advance			
Isaiah Aleksenko	100 metre butterfly	54.46 NR	48	Did not advance			
Anthony Deleon Guerrero	50 metre breaststroke	33.05	55	Did not advance			
Anthony Deleon Guerrero	100 metre breaststroke	1:12.66	67	Did not advance			

Women

Athlete	Event	Heat		Semifinal		Final	
Athlete	Event	Time	Rank	Time	Rank	Time	Rank
Maria Batallones	50 metre breaststroke	35.96	42	Did not advance			
Maria Batallones	50 metre butterfly	33.49	59	Did not advance			
Shoko Litulumar	50 metre freestyle	30.55	83	Did not advance			
Shoko Litulumar	50 metre backstroke	34.25	54	Did not advance			

Mixed

Athlete	Event	Heat		Final	
Athlete	Event	Time	Rank	Time	Rank
Isaiah Aleksenko; Anthony Deleon; Shoko Litulumar; Maria Batallones	4 × 100 m freestyle relay	4:05.62	39	Did not advance	
Isaiah Aleksenko; Maria Batallones; Anthony Deleon; Shoko Litulumar	4 × 100 m medley relay	4:31.93	35	Did not advance	
