= Northern Mariana Islands at the 2015 World Aquatics Championships =

- Flag of the Northern Mariana Islands
- World Aquatics code: NMI
- National federation: Northern Mariana Islands Swimming Federation

in Kazan, Russia
- Competitors: 4 in 1 sport
- Medals: Gold 0 Silver 0 Bronze 0 Total 0

World Aquatics Championships appearances
- 1973; 1975; 1978; 1982; 1986; 1991; 1994; 1998; 2001; 2003; 2005; 2007; 2009; 2011; 2013; 2015; 2017; 2019; 2022; 2023; 2024; 2025

Northern Mariana Islands competed at the 2015 World Aquatics Championships in Kazan, Russia from 24 July to 9 August 2015.

== Swimming ==
Swimmers from the Northern Mariana Islands have achieved qualifying standards in the following events (up to a maximum of 2 swimmers in each event at the A-standard entry time, and 1 at the B-standard):

Men

Athlete	Event	Heat		Semifinal		Final	
Athlete	Event	Time	Rank	Time	Rank	Time	Rank
Takumi Sugie	50 m freestyle	27.26	96	did not advance			
Takumi Sugie	100 m freestyle	1:00.23	108	did not advance			
Kaito Yanai	50 m breaststroke	31.46	62	did not advance			
Kaito Yanai	100 m breaststroke	1:09.59	71	did not advance			

Women

Athlete	Event	Heat		Semifinal		Final	
Athlete	Event	Time	Rank	Time	Rank	Time	Rank
Victoria Chentsova	400 m freestyle	4:44.15	48	—N/a		did not advance	
Victoria Chentsova	800 m freestyle	9:48.87	43	—N/a		did not advance	
Angel de Jesus	50 m freestyle	30.57	94	did not advance			
Angel de Jesus	50 m butterfly	33.86	61	did not advance			
