= 2025 Oceania Athletics Cup =

5th Oceania Cup
- Dates: 30–31 October, 2025
- Host city: Nuku'alofa, Tonga
- Venue: Teufaiva Sport Stadium
- Level: Senior
- Events: 32

The 2025 Oceania Cup was an international track and field sporting event that was held in Nuku'alofa, Tonga, on 29–30 October, 2025. It was the fifth edition of the Oceania Cup.

== Format ==
The competition will follow a team-based format administered by the Oceania Athletics Association (OAA) with eight teams scheduled to take part. The competition comprises a programme of 15 track and field events for men and women as well as 2 mixed relay events, giving a total of 32 events.

Teams may enter as many athletes as they like in every event (with the exception of the high jump), but only one male and one female athlete may compete and score. Teams are only allowed to have a maximum of two athletes of each gender in the high jump. Every team is allowed to enter no more than of just one team in the relay event(s).

Only those athletes from each team with the highest ranking will be eligible to score. However, in order to receive a score, athletes must register a performance. The top-eight athletes receive individual events score distributions of 10-8-6-5-4-3-2-1 based on their finishes. The eight winning teams each receive 20-16-12-10-8-6-4-2 points for the relays. The team with the most points at the conclusion of the competition will be named the Oceania Athletics champions and awarded a trophy.

== Medal summary ==
=== Men ===
Event	Gold		Silver		Bronze	
100 metres Details	Jai Gordon (AUS); Australia	10.46	Pais Wisil (PNG); Melanesia	10.60	Joseph Randolph (HAW); Hawaii	10.80
200 metres Details	Joseph Randolph (HAW); Hawaii	21.14	Liam Granato (AUS); Australia	21.61 (21.603)	Johnny Malua (SAM); Polynesia	21.61 (21.606)
400 metres Details	Josh Fabiani (AUS); Australia	48.06	Daniel Baul (PNG); Melanesia	48.79	Blake Wood (NZL); New Zealand	48.88
800 metres Details	Jag Willers (NZL); New Zealand	1:53.09	William Dyball (AUS); Australia	1:54.12	Stephen Rahuasi (SOL); Melanesia	1:56.05
1500 metres Details	Dezmond Cutter (AUS); Australia	3:57.59	Jag Willers (NZL); New Zealand	3:59.12	Jiuteis Robinson (PNG); Melanesia	4:00.53
3000 metres Details	Dezmond Cutter (AUS); Australia	8:49.32	Jiuteis Robinson (PNG); Melanesia	8:59.85	Felice Civillon (PYF); Polynesia	9:26.87
110 metres hurdles Details	Errol Qaqa (FIJ); Melanesia	14.86	Maika Pedro (SAM); Polynesia	15.47	Luke Moffit (NZL); New Zealand	15.60
400 metres hurdles Details	Daniel Baul (PNG); Melanesia	54.65	Luke Moffit (NZL); New Zealand	55.98	Pol-Elie Raoult (PYF); Polynesia	56.13
High jump Details	Zane Paterson (AUS); Australia	2.10 m	Not awarded		Samasoni Hewitt (COK); Polynesia	1.90 m
High jump Details	Connor Larsen (AUS); Australia	2.10 m	Not awarded		Samasoni Hewitt (COK); Polynesia	1.90 m
Long jump Details	Samuela Vunivalu (FIJ); Melanesia	7.05 m	Piritau Nga (COK); Polynesia	6.71 m	Zane Paterson (AUS); Australia	6.69 m
Triple jump Details	Zhan Bowden (NZL)	14.44 m	Pol-Elie Raoult (PYF)	13.70 m	Samuela Vunivalu (FIJ)	13.21
Shot put Details	Nathaniel Sulupo (SAM); Polynesia	16.68 m	Jackson Mellor (AUS); Australia	13.65 m	David Mora (NZL); New Zealand	13.58 m
Discus throw Details	Nathaniel Sulupo (SAM); Polynesia	48.02 m	Penisimani Ta'e'iloa (TGA); Tonga	46.92 m	Tom Stunden (AUS); Australia	45.99 m
Hammer throw Details	Jackson Mellor (AUS); Australia	56.29 m	Nathaniel Sulupo (SAM); Polynesia	40.62 m	Shyson Cachuela (HAW); Hawaii	33.05 m
Javelin throw Details	Lakona Gerega (PNG); Melanesia	68.91 m NR	Lucas Osida (PNG); Melanesia	64.22 m	Sione Vakata (TGA); Tonga	58.49 m

=== Women ===
Event	Gold		Silver		Bronze	
100 metres Details	Ebony Newton (AUS); Australia	12.09	Jorja Gibbons (NZL); New Zealand	12.14	Aviva Damjanovic (AUS); Regional Australia	12.29
200 metres Details	Mia de Jager (NZL); New Zealand	24.19	Charlize Sivyer (AUS); Australia	24.51	Aviva Damjanovic (AUS); Regional Australia	25.39
400 metres Details	Jasmine Guthrie (AUS); Australia	54.96	Ashley Pernecker (AUS); Australia	55.58	Charlize Sivyer (AUS); Australia	55.64
800 metres Details	Ashley Pernecker (AUS); Australia	2:12.47	Ella Matthiesson (AUS); Australia	2:17.76	Hannah McManus (NZL); New Zealand	2:21.52
1500 metres Details	Hannah McManus (NZL); New Zealand	4:45.07	Ella Matthiesson (AUS); Australia	4:46.12	Zara Pomfret (NZL); New Zealand	4:48.32
3000 metres Details	Audrey Hall (AUS); Australia	10:12.00	Nathania Tan (NMI); Micronesia	10:29.42	Ella Matthiesson (AUS); Australia	10:32.65
100 metres hurdles Details	[[ ]] (AUS); Australia	13.49	[[ ]] (AUS); Australia	14.55	[[ ]] (NZL); New Zealand	15.61
400 metres hurdles Details	[[ ]] (25x17px)		[[ ]] (25x17px)		[[ ]] (25x17px)	
High jump Details	[[ ]] (25x17px)		[[ ]] (25x17px)		[[ ]] (25x17px)	
Long jump Details	[[ ]] (25x17px)		[[ ]] (25x17px)		[[ ]] (25x17px)	
Triple jump Details	[[ ]] (25x17px)		[[ ]] (25x17px)		[[ ]] (25x17px)	
Shot put Details	[[ ]] (25x17px)		[[ ]] (25x17px)		[[ ]] (25x17px)	
Discus throw Details	[[ ]] (25x17px)		[[ ]] (25x17px)		[[ ]] (25x17px)	
Hammer throw Details	[[ ]] (25x17px)		[[ ]] (25x17px)		[[ ]] (25x17px)	
Javelin throw Details	[[ ]] (25x17px)		[[ ]] (25x17px)		[[ ]] (25x17px)	

=== Mixed ===
Event	Gold	Silver	Bronze
4 × 100 m relay Details	[[ ]] (25x17px) [[ ]] (25x17px) [[ ]] (25x17px) [[ ]] (25x17px)	[[ ]] (25x17px) [[ ]] (25x17px) [[ ]] (25x17px) [[ ]] (25x17px)	[[ ]] (25x17px) [[ ]] (25x17px) [[ ]] (25x17px) [[ ]] (25x17px)
4 × 400 m relay Details	[[ ]] (25x17px) [[ ]] (25x17px) [[ ]] (25x17px) [[ ]] (25x17px)	[[ ]] (25x17px) [[ ]] (25x17px) [[ ]] (25x17px) [[ ]] (25x17px)	[[ ]] (25x17px) [[ ]] (25x17px) [[ ]] (25x17px) [[ ]] (25x17px)

== Participating nations ==
Eight teams are scheduled to compete — the three sub-regions of Oceania (Melanesia, Micronesia, and Polynesia); the host federation Tonga, along with Australia and New Zealand, will field separate teams. Hawaii, a non-member federation, will make its debut after being officially invited by the OAA. Regional Australia, a team comprising athletes from rural communities in Australia, will form the eighth team.

Athletes are nominated by their national federations in accordance with OAA eligibility rules. The three regional composite teams — Melanesia, Micronesia, and Polynesia — will be formed through nominations from OAA member federations. A selection working group appointed by the OAA will oversee the athlete selection process. For the Australian team, athletes born between 2003 and 2005 who have not represented Australia at a World Championships, Commonwealth Games, or Olympic Games are eligible for selection. The New Zealand team will comprise under-23 athletes.
