= Northern Mariana Islands at the 2024 World Aquatics Championships =

- Flag of the Northern Mariana Islands
- FINA code: NMI
- National federation: Northern Mariana Islands Swimming Federation
- Website: nmiswimmingfederation.org

in Doha, Qatar
- Competitors: 2 in 1 sport
- Medals: Gold 0 Silver 0 Bronze 0 Total 0

World Aquatics Championships appearances
- 1973; 1975; 1978; 1982; 1986; 1991; 1994; 1998; 2001; 2003; 2005; 2007; 2009; 2011; 2013; 2015; 2017; 2019; 2022; 2023; 2024

Northern Mariana Islands competed at the 2024 World Aquatics Championships in Doha, Qatar from 2 to 18 February.

== Swimming ==
Northern Mariana Islands entered 2 swimmers.

Men

Athlete	Event	Heat		Semifinal		Final	
Athlete	Event	Time	Rank	Time	Rank	Time	Rank
Isaiah Aleksenko	200 metre butterfly	2:10.17	36	Did not advance			
Isaiah Aleksenko	200 metre individual medley	Disqualified		Did not advance			

Women

Athlete	Event	Heat		Semifinal		Final	
Athlete	Event	Time	Rank	Time	Rank	Time	Rank
Maria Batallones	100 metre breaststroke	1:19.79	48	Did not advance			
Maria Batallones	200 metre breaststroke	2:54.73	29	Did not advance			
