= Athletics at the 2014 Micronesian Games =

Athletics at the VIII Micronesian Games
- Dates: July 21–24
- Host city: Palikir, Pohnpei (Pohnpei State)
- Venue: Pohnpei Track and Field
- Level: Senior
- Events: 38 (19 men, 19 women)
- Participation: 142 athletes from 8 nations
- Records set: 3

Athletics competitions at the 2014 Micronesian Games were held at the Pohnpei Track and Field in Palikir, Pohnpei, from July 21–24, 2014.

A total of 38 events were contested, 19 each by men and women.

== Medal summary ==
Medal winners and their results were published on the OAA webpage.

=== Men ===
Event	Gold		Silver		Bronze	
100 metres (wind: NWI)	Kitson Kapiriel; Pohnpei	11.20	Shaquille Teltull; Palau	11.21	Scott Fiti; Chuuk	11.53
200 metres (wind: NWI)	Shaquille Teltull; Palau	22.73	Roman Cress; Marshall Islands	22.95	Scott Fiti; Chuuk	23.04
400 metres	Beouch Ngirchongor; Northern Mariana Islands	52.74	Tarrell Smith; Chuuk	52.77	Gwynn Uehara; Palau	53.25
800 metres	Casey Henry; Pohnpei	2:09.95	Carson Mongkeya; Kosrae	2:11.65	John-Rico Togogae; Nauru	2:12.35
1500 metres	Jay Gallen; Pohnpei	4:41.13	Jessy James; Northern Mariana Islands	4:41.30	Rexter Muritok; Chuuk	4:42.34
5000 metres	Casey Henry; Pohnpei	18:51.91	Magdano Marquez; Pohnpei	18:53.08	Rexter Muritok; Chuuk	19:06.89
10000 metres	Magdano Marquez; Pohnpei	39:33.34	Rexter Muritok; Chuuk	39:37.18	Joynal Mize; Palau	41:17.04
Half marathon	Magdano Marquez; Pohnpei	1:17:36 GR	Jessy James; Northern Mariana Islands	1:18.58	Rexter Muritok; Chuuk	1:20:20
110 metres hurdles (wind: NWI)	Savier Edwin; Pohnpei	17.31	Francis Asher; Kosrae	18.73	Brian Kapriel; Pohnpei	19.94
400 metres hurdles	Beouch Ngirchongor; Northern Mariana Islands	1:00.89	Savier Edwin; Pohnpei	1:02.13	McCaffrey Gilmete; Pohnpei	1:02.47
High jump	Adolph Speng Demei Jr. Palau	1.50m	Jaynard White; Northern Mariana Islands	1.50m	Jacques Stills; Palau	1.45m
Long jump	Kius You; Yap	5.86m (wind: NWI)	Roger Nakasone; Pohnpei	5.77m (wind: NWI)	Junior Dagiaro Tau; Nauru	5.63m (wind: NWI)
Triple jump	Francis Tkel; Palau	11.83m (wind: NWI)	Roger Nakasone; Pohnpei	11.43m (wind: NWI)	Ned Hiroshi; Kosrae	11.22m (wind: NWI)
Shot put	Joseph Dabana; Nauru	13.46m	Florian Temengil; Palau	12.59m	Daniel G. Ramngen; Yap	11.18m
Discus throw	Florian Temengil; Palau	38.90m	Joseph Dabana; Nauru	36.00m	Clayton Maluwelgiye; Pohnpei	34.07m
Javelin throw	Herney Ringlen; Pohnpei	49.71m	Fedelis Falmed; Yap	47.44m	Clayton Maluwelgiye; Pohnpei	47.06m
Octathlon	Francis Tkel; Palau	3643pts	Orrin Pharmin; Northern Mariana Islands	3403pts	Jesse Jack; Pohnpei	3341pts
4 x 100 metres relay	Pohnpei; X-Ler Rodriguez; Pahnrasko Ardos; Benter Pluhs; Kitson Kapiriel	43.83	Chuuk; Yonder Namelo; Scott Fiti; Tarrell Smith; Yondan Namelo	44.30	Palau; Ian Koshiba; Gwynn Uehara; Adolph Speng Demei Jr. Shaquille Teltull	44.38
4 x 400 metres relay	Palau; Gwynn Uehara; Joab Kanai; Francis Tkel; Shaquille Teltull	3:25.52	Pohnpei; Johnathan Laurdine; Savier Edwin; McCaffrey Gilmete; Pahnrasko Ardos	3:38.02	Chuuk; Tarrell Smith; Miurha Kapier; Doone Nomar; Scott Fiti	3:38.82

=== Women ===
Event	Gold		Silver		Bronze	
100 metres (wind: NWI)	Lanja Fritz; Nauru	12.80	Rachel Abrams; Northern Mariana Islands	13.03	Mariana Cress; Marshall Islands	13.32
200 metres (wind: NWI)	Rachel Abrams; Northern Mariana Islands	26.29 GR	Lanja Fritz; Nauru	26.75	Mariana Cress; Marshall Islands	26.99
400 metres	Merisen Mariano; Chuuk	1:05.41	Geraldine Poll; Pohnpei	1:07.45	Anitra Ligorio; Pohnpei	1:08.03
800 metres	Christina Wicker; Palau	2:28.01	Mary Linda Alexander; Pohnpei	2:44.47	Carolynn Wicker; Palau	2:48.70
1500 metres	Christina Wicker; Palau	5:23.50	Carolynn Wicker; Palau	5:39.14	Mary Linda Alexander; Pohnpei	5:39.18
5000 metres	Christina Wicker; Palau	18:51.75 GR	Reloliza Saimon; Pohnpei	21:53.37	Carolynn Wicker; Palau	22:47.21
10000 metres	Reloliza Saimon; Pohnpei	49:25.58				
Half marathon	Reloliza Saimon; Pohnpei	1:34:48 GR	Christina Wicker; Palau	1:39:08		
100 metres hurdles (wind: NWI)	Rachel Abrams; Northern Mariana Islands	17.50	Ashley Apiner; Pohnpei	17.84	Aleina Thomsin; Pohnpei	20.79
400 metres hurdles	Ruby Joy Gabriel; Palau	1:15.51	Ashley Apiner; Pohnpei	1:20.35	Aleina Thomsin; Pohnpei	1:21.86
High jump	Rachel Abrams; Northern Mariana Islands	1.38m	Friendly Joy Pena; Northern Mariana Islands	1.25m		
Long jump	Mihter Wendolin; Pohnpei	4.62m (wind: NWI)	Juanita Marie Mungwaath; Yap	4.51m (wind: NWI)	Natalie Sewralur; Palau	4.15m (wind: NWI)
Triple jump	Mihter Wendolin; Pohnpei	9.32m (wind: NWI)				
Shot put	Lucinda Kamloy; Yap	10.61m	Nina Grundler; Nauru	10.42m	Sweetyona Tulensru; Kosrae	9.54m
Discus throw	Dolores Rangamar; Northern Mariana Islands	26.42m	Lia'mwar Rangamar; Northern Mariana Islands	26.40m	Nina Grundler; Nauru	25.81m
Javelin throw	Lia'mwar Rangamar; Northern Mariana Islands	34.63m	Ashley Apiner; Pohnpei	32.13m	Tracy Ardos; Pohnpei	29.06m
Pentathlon	Dilluna Rivera; Palau	1183pts	Marianne Lomongo; Palau	796pts		
4 x 100 metres relay	Pohnpei; Anitra Ligorio; Geraldine Poll; Ashley Apiner; Mihter Wendolin	52.22 GR	Northern Mariana Islands; Friendly Joy Pena; Rachel Abrams; Zarinae Sapong; Lia'mwar Rangamar	53.87	Marshall Islands; Hemrita Debrum; Mattie Sasser; Mariana Cress; Lani Keju	53.88
4 x 400 metres relay	Pohnpei; Anitra Ligorio; Geraldine Poll; Ashley Apiner; Mihter Wendolin	4:32.50	Palau; Rema Joy Maido; Carolynn Wicker; Eliana Koshiba-Panuelo; Christina Wicker	4:36.66	Kosrae; Filona L. Wesley; Lihen Jonas; Stacy Ann Albert; Selina Palik	5:07.71

== Medal table (unofficial) ==
* Host nation (Pohnpei)

Rank	Nation	Gold	Silver	Bronze	Total
1	Pohnpei*	15	11	10	36
2	Palau	11	6	7	24
3	Northern Mariana Islands	7	8	0	15
4	Nauru	2	3	3	8
5	Yap	2	2	1	5
6	Chuuk	1	3	6	10
7	Kosrae	0	2	3	5
8	Marshall Islands	0	1	3	4
Totals (8 entries)		38	36	33	107

== Participation ==
According to an unofficial count, 142 athletes from 8 countries participated.

- Chuuk (14)
- Kosrae (18)
- Marshall Islands (13)
- Nauru (5)
- Northern Mariana Islands (18)
- Palau (25)
- Pohnpei (38)
- Yap (11)
