= Nathania Tan =

Northern Mariana Islands athlete

Personal information
- Nationality: Northern Mariana Island
- Born: Nathania Chung Yee Tan; 1 July 2001 (age 25)

Sport
- Sport: Athletics
- Event: Long distance running

Achievements and titles
- Personal best(s): 1,500 m: 5:07.30 (Saipan, 2023); 3,000 m: 10:18.81 (Boston, 2023); 5,000 m: 18:02.04 (Kingston, 2023); 10,000 m: 36:48.49 (Azusa, 2024)
Medal record
Women's athletics
Representing Northern Mariana Islands
Oceania Championships
Gold medal – first place	2022 Mackay	10,000 m
Silver medal – second place	2022 Mackay	5,000 m
Pacific Games
Gold medal – first place	2023 Honiara	5,000 m
Gold medal – first place	2023 Honiara	10,000 m

Nathania Chung Yee Tan (born 1 July 2001) is a track and field athlete from the Northern Mariana Islands who specialises in long-distance running. She is the national 3,000 m, 5,000 m and 10,000m record-holder.

== Early life ==
Tan grew up in Saipan, Northern Mariana Islands with a Malaysian mother and Chinese father. She attended Saipan International School and Fordham University. After gaining an undergraduate degree in 2023, she joined the University of Hawaiʻi at Mānoa.

== Career ==
She is the 3,000 m, 5,000 m and 10,000m national record-holder for the Northern Mariana Islands.

In 2019, aged 18, Tan competed at the 2019 Pacific Games in Apia, Samoa. She completed the course in a time of one hour 51 minutes 52 seconds and finished fourth of the four runners in the half marathon.

At the 2022 Oceania Athletics Championships in Mackay, Queensland, Australia, Tan won gold in the 10,000 m and silver in the 5,000 m, the Northern Mariana Islands only medals at the event.

In 2023, she competed at the World Cross Country Championships in Bathurst, New South Wales, Australia.

At the 2023 Pacific Games in Honiara, Solomon Islands, Tan won gold medal in both the 5,000 m and the 10,000 m. These were the first-ever Pacific titles won by the Northern Mariana Islands. Tan set a new games record in 5,000 m 18 minutes 8.69 seconds. She also competed in the half marathon at the games, finishing fourth.

In 2024, she competed at the World Cross Country Championships in Belgrade, Serbia.

In October 2025, Tan was a silver medalist over 3000 metres at the 2025 Oceania Athletics Cup in Tonga, finishing runner-up to Australian runner Audrey Hall. On 10 January 2026, she placed 80th overall at the 2026 World Athletics Cross Country Championships. In May, Tab placed seventh over 1500 metres at the 2026 Oceania Athletics Championships in Darwin, Australia, later finishing fourth over 5000 m later at the championships.

== Personal life ==
Her father, Jerry Tan, is the president of the Northern Mariana Islands Football Association.
