= Lakara Stallan =

Australian sprinter (born 2003)

Personal information
- Born: 29 November 2003 (age 22)

Sport
- Sport: Athletics
- Event: Sprint

Achievements and titles
- Personal best(s): 60m: 7.35 (2025); 100m: 11.51 (2023); 200m: 22.86 (2025)
Medal record
Women's athletics
Representing Australia
Oceania Championships
Silver medal – second place	2026 Darwin	200 m

Lakara Stallan (born 29 November 2003) is an Australian sprinter. She won the Australian Athletics Championships in 2026 over 200 metres.

== Biography ==
Stallan won the Perth Track Classic in 22.97 seconds for the 200 metres on 1 March 2025. That month, she placed third over 200 metres at the 2025 Maurie Plant Meet, running 23.39 seconds. She ran as part of an Australian women's 4 x 100 metres relay team which placed fifth at the 2025 London Athletics Meet.

Stallan won the 200 metres at the 2026 Australian Athletics Championships running in 23.25 seconds. She was selected for the Australian team to compete at the 2026 World Athletics Relays in Gaborone, Botswana. She was selected for the 200 metres as part of the Australian team to compete at the 2026 Oceania Athletics Championships in Darwin, Northern Territory. She was named to the mixed 4 x 100 metres relay alongside Chloe Mannix-Power, Jai Gordon and Calab Law with the team running 40.78 seconds on the opening day. The following day, the quartet won their heat to successfully qualify for the 2027 World Championships. She was selected as part of the Australian team to compete at the 2026 Oceania Athletics Championships, winning the silver medal behind Mia Gross in the 200 metres in Darwin, Northern Territory on 21 May.

== Personal life ==
From Adelaide, Stallan is an indigenous Australian. She later joined the New South Wales Institute of Sport, coached by Andrew Murphy, and was a recipient of the Neville Sillitoe Foundation Scholarship.
