= Athletics at the 2019 Pan American Games – Men's 1500 metres =

Men's 1500 metres at the 2019 Pan American Games
- Venue: Athletics Stadium
- Dates: August 8
- Competitors: 13 from 10 nations
- Winning time: 3:39.93

Medalists
| Gold medal | José Carlos Villarreal; Mexico |
| Silver medal | John Gregorek Jr. United States |
| Bronze medal | William Paulson; Canada |

The men's 1500 metres competition of the athletics events at the 2019 Pan American Games took place on the 8 August at the 2019 Pan American Games Athletics Stadium. The defending Pan American Games champion was Andrew Wheating from United States. The event was won by José Carlos Villareal of Mexico.

== Summary ==
Assuming the lead 50 metres into the race, John Gregorek Jr. strung out the field with William Paulson next in line. Gregorek took them through a 43.7 first 300, while José Carlos Villarreal worked his way into the third position in line. They remained in that position through the next lap at 1:44.2. Through the penultimate lap, Federico Bruno moved forward, poking into the lead at the bell in 2:45.1. Through the turn, Gregorek held him to the outside, a little jostling, then Bruno accelerated into the lead. Paulson followed Bruno and accelerated into a 3-metre lead down the backstretch as Bruno strained and Gregorek moved back into second place. Gregorek slowly gained to be in position to sprint past Paulson coming off the turn, executing his move and pulling away from Paulson. However, halfway through the turn, Villarreal launched into a sprint to get around Bruno. He kept his sprint going after the leaders. By the time he caught them, he was in a different gear and was no match, going on to take the win by 4 metres. This kind of kick is not a surprise to YouTubers. Running as Carlos Villarreal from the University of Arizona, he executed the same kick in a viral Video on YouTube.

== Records ==
Prior to this competition, the existing world and Pan American Games records were as follows:

| World record | Hicham El Guerrouj (MAR) | 3:26.00 | Rome, Italy | July 14, 1998 |
| Pan American Games record | Hudson de Souza (BRA) | 3:36.32 | Rio de Janeiro, Brazil | July 25, 2007 |

== Schedule ==
| Date | Time | Round |
|---|---|---|
| August 8, 2019 | 16:55 | Final |

== Results ==
All times shown are in seconds.

| KEY: | q | Fastest non-qualifiers | Q | Qualified | NR | National record | PB | Personal best | SB | Seasonal best | DQ | Disqualified |

=== Final ===
The results were as follows:

| Rank | Name | Nationality | Time | Notes |
|---|---|---|---|---|
| 1st place, gold medalist(s) | José Carlos Villarreal | Mexico | 3:39.93 | |
| 2nd place, silver medalist(s) | John Gregorek Jr. | United States | 3:40.42 | |
| 3rd place, bronze medalist(s) | William Paulson | Canada | 3:41.15 | |
| 4 | Santiago Catrofe | Uruguay | 3:43.17 | |
| 5 | Federico Bruno | Argentina | 3:43.17 | SB |
| 6 | Carlos Santos | Brazil | 3:44.47 | SB |
| 7 | Fernando Daniel Martínez | Mexico | 3:45.13 | |
| 8 | Carlos Hernández | Colombia | 3:45.35 | PB |
| 9 | Diego Lacamoire | Argentina | 3:45.36 | |
| 10 | Andrés Arroyo | Puerto Rico | 3:47.42 | |
| 11 | Dage Minors | Bermuda | 3:48.85 | |
| 12 | Carlos Díaz | Chile | 3:49.33 | |
| 13 | Eduardo Gregorio | Uruguay | 3:49.66 | |
