= Luxembourg at the 2022 World Athletics Championships =

- Flag of Luxembourg
- WA code: LUX
- National federation: Luxembourg Athletics Federation
- Website: www.fla.lu

in Eugene, United States 15–24 July 2022
- Competitors: 2 (1 man and 1 woman) in 2 events
- Medals: Gold 0 Silver 0 Bronze 0 Total 0

World Athletics Championships appearances
- 1976; 1980; 1983; 1987; 1991; 1993; 1995; 1997; 1999; 2001; 2003; 2005; 2007; 2009; 2011; 2013; 2015; 2017; 2019; 2022; 2023; 2025

Luxembourg competed at the 2022 World Athletics Championships in Eugene, Oregon from 15 to 24 July 2022. Luxembourg had entered 2 athletes.

== Results ==
Key

- Q = Qualified for the next round
- q = Not qualified for the next round as a fastest loser or, in field events, by position without achieving the qualifying target
- NR = National record
- PB = Personal best
- SB = Season best
- N/A = Round not applicable for the event

=== Men ===
Track and road events

Athlete	Event	Heat		Semi-final		Final	
Athlete	Event	Result	Rank	Result	Rank	Result	Rank
Charles Grethen	1500 metres	3:36.51	14 Q	3:40.41	=21	Did not advance	

=== Women ===
Track and road events

Athlete	Event	Heat		Semi-final		Final	
Athlete	Event	Result	Rank	Result	Rank	Result	Rank
Patrizia van der Weken	100 metres	11.34	36	Did not advance			
