= Flag of the Trust Territory of the Pacific Islands =

Flag of the Trust Territory of the Pacific Islands, 1965 – early 1980s

The flag of the United Nations was used in the TTPI from 1947 to 1965

The flag of the United States was used in the TTPI from 1944 to the early 1980s (50-star version since 1960)

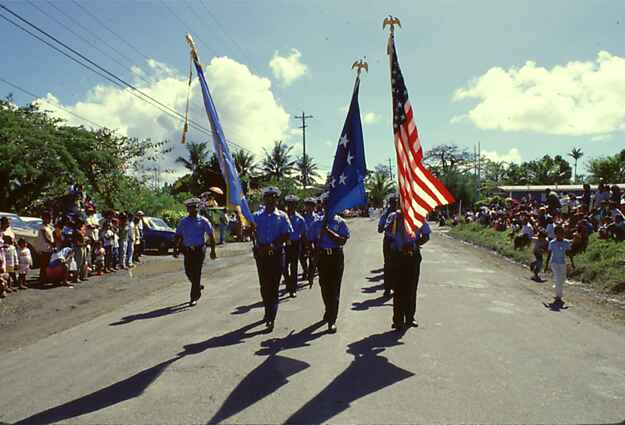
Palau District Constabulary in a parade; the TTPI flag is being carried at the center.

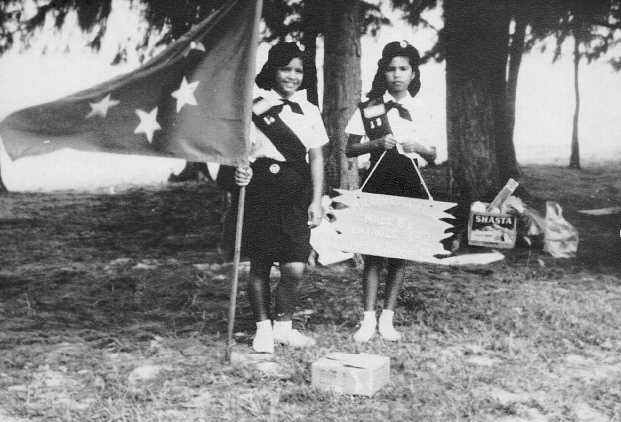
Girl Scouts with handmade TTPI flag

The flag of the Trust Territory of the Pacific Islands (TTPI) consisted of a light blue field that contained six white stars centered in a circle pattern. The stars symbolized the six districts of the Trust Territory of the Pacific Islands: the Marianas, the Marshall Islands, Yap, Chuuk, Pohnpei (including Kosrae), and Palau. The blue field symbolized freedom and loyalty.

The flag was the end product of a contest that was won by Gonzalo Santos, a government employee who lived in the Yap district. For his efforts, he won US$250. The Santos design was approved by the Council of Micronesia (an unofficial body) on October 3, 1962, and was first used on October 24. The flag was reapproved by the TTPI High Commissioner and the Congress of Micronesia in July 1965. The flag became official on August 19, 1965.

Before this time, the United States and United Nations flags were used in the trusteeship.

The flag was used until the 1970s and early 1980s. By this time, each district of the TTPI had adopted its own unique flag.

== See also ==
- Flag of the Northern Mariana Islands
- Flag of the Marshall Islands
- Flag of the Federated States of Micronesia
- Flag of Palau
