= José Carlos Villarreal =

Mexican middle-distance runner

Carlos Villarreal
Personal information
- Full name: José Carlos Villarreal Peinado
- Born: May 10, 1997 (age 29) Puerto Peñasco, Sonora, Mexico
- Height: 175 cm (5 ft 9 in)

Sport
- Country: Mexico
- Sport: Track and Field
- Events: 800 metres; 1500 metres; Mile; 3000 metres
- University team: Arizona Wildcats
- Club: On Athletics Club
- Turned pro: 2020
- Coached by: Dathan Ritzenhein
- Retired: May 2022
Medal record
Representing Mexico
Pan American Games
Gold medal – first place	2019 Lima	1500 m
- Updated on August 9, 2019

José Carlos Villarreal Peinado (born 10 May 1997) is a Mexican middle-distance runner. He is the 2019 Pan American Games champion at 1500 meters.

== Prep ==
He moved to the United States with his family at age 6, graduating from Rio Rico High School in Rio Rico, Arizona. He converted to middle-distance running from the 400 meters. On his 17th birthday, he led his high school team to the AIA Division 3 Track & Field state championship, winning the 800 meters and 1600 meters (in record time). He was also state champion in cross country.

== NCAA ==
Next, Victor Ortiz-Rivera, James Smith, Camron Herron, Carlos Villarreal won 2020 Mountain Pacific Sports Federation Distance Medley Relay title representing the University of Arizona. Villarreal is an NCAA Division I All-American in 1500 m earning it at 2019 NCAA Division I Outdoor Track and Field Championships in Austin, Texas and placed 4th in the mile at 2019 NCAA Division I Indoor Track and Field Championships.

== Professional ==
José Carlos Villarreal Peinado won 2021 Antelope Invitational 800 meters.

== Personal bests ==
Outdoor

- 800 metres – 1:46.70 (Tucson 2018)
- 1500 metres – 3:37.22 (Azusa 2019)
- Mile – 3:58.64 (Los Angeles 2020)
- 3000 metres – 8:42.84 (Tucson 2018)
- 5000 metres – 14:07.05 (Palo Alto 2019)

Indoor

- 1500 metres – 3:41.48 (New York 2020)
- Mile – 3:56.77 (New York 2020)
