= Jai Gordon =

Australian sprinter

Personal information
- Born: 18 May 2003 (age 23)

Sport
- Sport: Athletics
- Event: Sprint

Achievements and titles
- Personal bests: 60m: 6.59 (2025); 100m: 10.17 (2026); 200m: 21.32 (2022)

Jai Gordon (born 18 May 2003) is an Australian sprinter. He became Australian champion over 60 metres in 2026.

== Biography ==
From Toowoomba, Queensland, Gordon is a member of Darling Downs Athletics Club. In 2022, Gordon lowered his personal best for the 100 metres to 10.34 seconds (+1.8 m/s) at the Melbourne Track Classic. He then lowered it at the 2022 Australian Track and Field Championships in March, to win the 2022 under-20 100m final in 10.28 seconds. Gordon subsequently represented Australia at the 2022 World Athletics Championships in Cali, Colombia.

In October 2025, he was the gold medalist over 100 metres at the 2025 Oceania Athletics Cup in Tonga, finishing ahead of Pais Wisil. In January 2026, he ran a wind-assisted 6.54 seconds (+2.2 m/s) for the 60 metres in Canberra. In February 2026, he became Australian national champion at the Australian Short Track Championships over 60 metres. On 11 April 2026, he was a finalist over 100 metres at the 2026 Australian Athletics Championships. He was selected for the Australian team to compete at the 2026 World Athletics Relays in Gaborone, Botswana. He was named to the mixed 4 x 100 metres relay alongside Lakara Stallan, Chloe Mannix-Power and Calab Law with the team running 40.78 seconds on the opening day. The following day, the quartet won their heat to successfully qualify for the 2027 World Championships.
