= Beouch Ngirchongor =

Northern Mariana Islands sprinter

Personal information
- Born: 1994 (age 31–32)

Sport
- Country: Northern Mariana Islands
- Sport: Track and field
- Event: sprinter
- Updated on 29 August 2015

Beouch Ngirchongor (born 1994) is a male Northern Mariana Islands sprinter. At the Micronesian Games he won the gold medal in the 400m in a new Northern Mariana Islands record of 52.74. He also won the 400 m hurdles. He competed in the 200 metres event at the 2015 World Championships in Athletics in Beijing, China.

== See also ==
- Northern Mariana Islands at the 2015 World Championships in Athletics
