= 2022 World Athletics Championships – Women's 100 metres =

Athletics event

Women's 100 metres at the 2022 World Championships
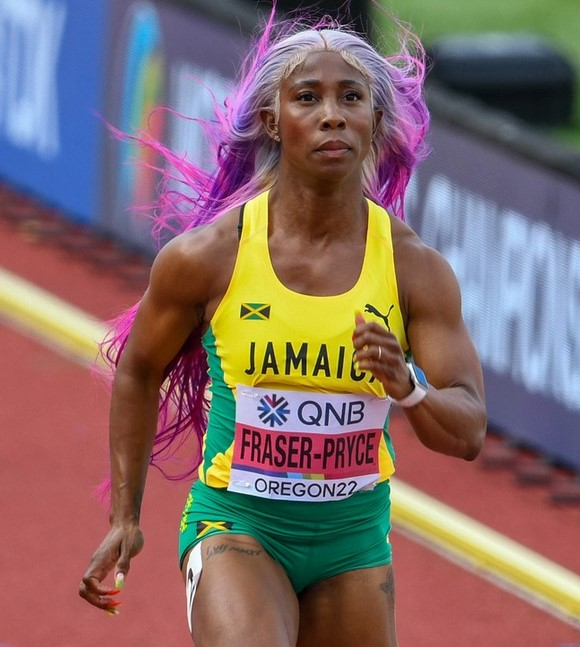
- Shelly-Ann Fraser-Pryce during the heat of the women's 100 metres.
- Venue: Hayward Field
- Dates: 16 July (heats); 17 July (semi-final & final)
- Competitors: 54 from 36 nations
- Winning time: 10.67 s CR

Medalists
gold medal	Shelly-Ann Fraser-Pryce	Jamaica
silver medal	Shericka Jackson	Jamaica
bronze medal	Elaine Thompson-Herah	Jamaica

Video on YouTube Official Video

The women's 100 metres at the 2022 World Athletics Championships was held at the Hayward Field in Eugene, Oregon, U.S. on 16 and 17 July 2022.

== Summary ==
As she has done for most of the previous 13 years Shelly-Ann Fraser-Pryce was off to a fast start, with Marie-Josée Ta Lou also out fast. By 30 metres, only Shericka Jackson was still close, Ta Lou fading to join a line across the track made up of Dina Asher-Smith, Mujinga Kambundji and two time Olympic Champion Elaine Thompson-Herah. Fraser-Pryce continued to open up space until about 20 metres out when Jackson was able to make a little headway on the sizable lead, but it was too little, too late. Thompson-Herah edged ahead of Asher-Smith to take bronze. With seven women going sub-11 seconds, this was the fastest 100m final in the World Championships history.

Just as in the Olympics, the same three athletes from Jamaica swept the medals, but in a different order. Now 35 years, 202 days old, Fraser-Pryce equalled her own Masters World Record with a 10.67, while claiming an unprecedented fifth World Championship in the same event.

Fraser-Pryce also became the first woman to win the 100m in 3 different decades, 2000s (2009), 2010s (2013/15/19), and 2020s (2022).

== Records ==
Before the competition records were as follows:

Record	Athlete & Nat.	Perf.	Location	Date
World record	Florence Griffith-Joyner (USA)	10.49	Indianapolis, United States	16 July 1988
Championship record	Marion Jones (USA)	10.70	Seville, Spain	22 August 1999
World Leading	Shelly-Ann Fraser-Pryce (JAM)	10.67	Nairobi, Kenya	7 May 2022
World Leading	Shelly-Ann Fraser-Pryce (JAM)	10.67	Paris, France	18 June 2022
African Record	Murielle Ahouré (CIV)	10.78	Montverde, United States	11 June 2016
African Record	Marie-Josée Ta Lou (CIV)	10.78	Tokyo, Japan	30 July 2021
Asian Record	Li Xuemei (CHN)	10.79	Shanghai, China	18 October 1997
North, Central American and Caribbean record	Florence Griffith-Joyner (USA)	10.49	Indianapolis, United States	16 July 1988
South American Record	Rosângela Santos (BRA)	10.91	London, Great Britain	6 August 2017
European Record	Christine Arron (FRA)	10.73	Budapest, Hungary	19 August 1998
Oceanian record	Zoe Hobbs (NZL)	11.09	Mackay, Australia	7 June 2022

The following records were set at the competition:

Record	Perf.	Athlete	Nat.	Date
Championship record	10.67	Shelly-Ann Fraser-Pryce	JAM	17 Jul 2022
World Leading	10.67	Shelly-Ann Fraser-Pryce	JAM	17 Jul 2022
Oceanian record	11.08	Zoe Hobbs	NZL	16 Jul 2022

== Qualification standard ==
The standard to qualify automatically for entry was 11.15.

== Schedule ==
The event schedule, in local time (UTC−7), was as follows:

Date	Time	Round
16 July	17:10	Heats
17 July	17:33	Semi-finals
17 July	19:50	Final

== Results ==
=== Heats ===
The first 3 athletes in each heat (Q) and the next 3 fastest (q) qualify to the semi-finals.

Wind:
Heat 1: +0.7 m/s, Heat 2: -0.2 m/s, Heat 3: +0.2 m/s, Heat 4: +0.8 m/s, Heat 5: +1.2 m/s, Heat 6: +0.1 m/s, Heat 7: -0.1 m/s

Rank	Heat	Name	Nationality	Time	Notes
1	5	Dina Asher-Smith	Great Britain & N.I.	10.84	Q, SB
2	2	Shelly-Ann Fraser-Pryce	Jamaica	10.87	Q
3	4	Marie-Josée Ta Lou	Ivory Coast	10.92	Q, SB
4	2	Daryll Neita	Great Britain & N.I.	10.95	Q, SB
4	4	Twanisha Terry	United States	10.95	Q
6	7	Mujinga Kambundji	Switzerland	10.97	Q
7	1	Shericka Jackson	Jamaica	11.02	Q
8	7	Melissa Jefferson	United States	11.03	Q
9	6	Aleia Hobbs	United States	11.04	Q
10	5	Julien Alfred	Saint Lucia	11.05	Q
11	7	Ewa Swoboda	Poland	11.07	Q
12	1	Zoe Hobbs	New Zealand	11.08	Q, AR
13	1	Anthonique Strachan	Bahamas	11.08	Q
14	5	Aminatou Seyni	Niger	11.09	Q
14	2	Gina Lückenkemper	Germany	11.09	Q
16	4	Kemba Nelson	Jamaica	11.10	Q
17	3	Elaine Thompson-Herah	Jamaica	11.15	Q
18	2	Tynia Gaither	Bahamas	11.16	q
19	3	Nzubechi Grace Nwokocha	Nigeria	11.16	Q
19	5	Murielle Ahouré	Ivory Coast	11.16	q
21	2	Ge Manqi	China	11.17	q
22	6	Michelle-Lee Ahye	Trinidad and Tobago	11.18	Q
23	5	Vitoria Cristina Rosa	Brazil	11.20	
24	1	Imani Lansiquot	Great Britain & N.I.	11.24	
25	1	Liang Xiaojing	China	11.25	
26	3	Zaynab Dosso	Italy	11.26	Q
27	3	Joella Lloyd	Antigua and Barbuda	11.27	
28	6	Edidiong Odiong	Bahrain	11.28	Q
29	3	Diana Vaisman	Israel	11.29	
30	7	Bree Masters	Australia	11.29	PB
31	5	Alexandra Burghardt	Germany	11.29	SB
32	4	Carina Horn	South Africa	11.29	
33	7	Maria Isabel Pérez	Spain	11.30	
34	6	Khamica Bingham	Canada	11.30	
34	4	Géraldine Frey	Switzerland	11.30	
36	4	Patrizia van der Weken	Luxembourg	11.34	
37	6	Ajla del Ponte	Switzerland	11.41	
38	7	Lorène Dorcas Bazolo	Portugal	11.44	
39	3	Crystal Emmanuel	Canada	11.48	
40	6	Jasmine Abrams	Guyana	11.55	
41	1	Olga Safronova	Kazakhstan	11.65	
42	2	Fatmata Awolo	Sierra Leone	11.77	
43	1	Mudhawi Alshammari	Kuwait	11.91	
44	2	Amya Clarke	Saint Kitts and Nevis	11.98	
45	5	Hereiti Bernardino	French Polynesia	12.90	
46	6	Zarinae Sapong	Northern Mariana Islands	12.98	
47	7	Jovita Arunia	Solomon Islands	13.15	
48	3	Yasmeen Aldabbagh	Saudi Arabia	13.21	
49	4	Ka'alieena Bien	Marshall Islands	14.71	

=== Semi-finals ===
The semi-finals started on 17 July at 17:33.

Wind:
Heat 1: -0.2 m/s, Heat 2: -0.2 m/s, Heat 3: +0.4 m/s

Rank	Heat	Name	Nationality	Time	Notes
1	2	Elaine Thompson-Herah	Jamaica	10.82	Q
2	1	Shericka Jackson	Jamaica	10.84	Q
3	2	Marie-Josée Ta Lou	Ivory Coast	10.87	Q, SB
4	1	Dina Asher-Smith	Great Britain & N.I.	10.89	Q
5	2	Melissa Jefferson	United States	10.92	q
6	3	Shelly-Ann Fraser-Pryce	Jamaica	10.93	Q
7	3	Aleia Hobbs	United States	10.95	Q
8	2	Mujinga Kambundji	Switzerland	10.96	q
9	3	Daryll Neita	Great Britain & N.I.	10.97	
10	2	Anthonique Strachan	Bahamas	10.98	PB
11	1	Twanisha Terry	United States	11.04	
12	2	Ewa Swoboda	Poland	11.08	
13	3	Gina Lückenkemper	Germany	11.08	
14	3	Zoe Hobbs	New Zealand	11.13	
15	2	Ge Manqi	China	11.13	
16	1	Nzubechi Grace Nwokocha	Nigeria	11.16	
17	1	Aminatou Seyni	Niger	11.21	
18	3	Michelle-Lee Ahye	Trinidad and Tobago	11.24	
19	1	Kemba Nelson	Jamaica	11.25	
20	1	Murielle Ahouré	Ivory Coast	11.25	
21	3	Zaynab Dosso	Italy	11.28	
22	2	Edidiong Odiong	Bahrain	11.56	
	1	Julien Alfred	Saint Lucia	DQ	
	3	Tynia Gaither	Bahamas	DQ	

=== Final ===
The final started on 17 July at 19:50.

Wind: +0.8 m/s

Rank	Name	Nationality	Time	Notes
1st place, gold medalist(s)	Shelly-Ann Fraser-Pryce	Jamaica	10.67	CR,=WL
2nd place, silver medalist(s)	Shericka Jackson	Jamaica	10.73	PB
3rd place, bronze medalist(s)	Elaine Thompson-Herah	Jamaica	10.81	
4	Dina Asher-Smith	Great Britain & N.I.	10.83	=NR
5	Mujinga Kambundji	Switzerland	10.91	
6	Aleia Hobbs	United States	10.92	
7	Marie-Josée Ta Lou	Ivory Coast	10.93	
8	Melissa Jefferson	United States	11.03	
