= Lanja Fritz =

Nauruan sprinter

Trienssa Lanja Fritz
Personal information
- Nationality: Nauru
- Born: 1995 (age 30–31)

Sport
- Sport: Athletics
- Events: 100m, 200m
Medal record
Women's athletics
Representing Nauru
Micronesian Games
Gold medal – first place	2014 Palikir	100 m
Silver medal – second place	2014 Palikir	200 m

Trienssa Lanja Fritz (born 1995), also known professionally as Lanja Fritz is a sprinter from Nauru.

== Career ==
Fritz has competed as a sprinter within Nauru and internationally. She began competing as a teenager and in 2008 represented Nauru in the Pacific School Games in Canberra.

In the 2009 Nauru National Games, she won gold in the 60 metres.

She has competed in several Oceania Championships including in 2009 (Gold Coast, 200 metres, placing 11th and 100 metres, placing 27th), 2014 (Rarotonga, in 200 metres, placing 10th), and 2015 (Cairns, 100 metres, placing 14th).

In the 2014 Micronesian Games, in Palikir, Federated States of Micronesia, she won gold medal in the 100 metres sprint and silver medal in the 200 metres sprint. Following these wins, she was recognised by the government of Nauru for her achievements in athletics.

At the 2014 Coral Coast Track & Field Carnival in Cairns she won the silver medal in the 100 metres.

In July 2015, Frizt moved to Cairns and joined the Cairns Athletics Club where she regularly trained.

Fritz has qualified as a coaches lecturer and since 2016 she has worked as a development officer with Nauru Athletics Association.

== Personal life ==
In 2016, she had a son, and continued her dreams in Sports Development and Management
