= Oceania Athletics Cup =

International athletics competition

Oceania Cup
- Status: active
- Genre: sports event
- Frequency: biennial
- Location: various
- Inaugurated: 2001
- Most recent: 2025
- Next event: 2027
- Organiser: Oceania Athletics Association
- Website: athletics-oceania.com

The Oceania Athletics Cup (simply Oceania Cup), is an international track and field competition organised by Oceania Athletics, between different teams of Oceania.

The first edition was held in 2001 in Port Vila. After the second edition in 2003, the event was subsequently cancelled due to the sub-regional championships of Melanesia, Micronesia and Polynesia. However, the competition was revived in 2021 resulting from the impacts of the COVID-19 pandemic due to numerous athletics competitions in the region being postponed/cancelled altogether.

Unlike most international competitions, medals are not awarded to individuals in individual events but to the overall winning team on a points system.

== Editions ==
The Australian teams for the first two editions recruited athletes from the winning team of the Australian Clubs Championships, which, in both years, was the University of Queensland Athletic Club.

	Year	City	Country	Date	Venue	No. of Events	No. of Athletes
1	2001	Port Vila	Vanuatu	July 14			
2	2003	Apia	Samoa	June 26–27	Apia Park		
3	2021	Runaway Bay, Gold Coast	Australia	5 June	Gold Coast Performance Centre		
4	2023	Saipan	Northern Mariana Islands	23–24 June	Oleai Sports Complex	32	+100
5	2025	Nuku'alofa	Tonga	29–30 October	Teufaiva Sport Stadium	32	TBA

== See also ==
- Oceania Athletics Championships
