= Chloe Mannix-Power =

Australian sprinter (born 2000)

Personal information
- Born: 29 November 2000 (age 25)

Sport
- Sport: Athletics
- Event: Sprint

Achievements and titles
- Personal bests: 60m: 7.23 (Sydney, 2025); 100m: 11.41 (Sydney, 2025); 200: 23.28 (Brisbane, 2024)

Chloe Mannix-Power (born 29 November 2000) is an Australian sprinter.

== Biography ==
From Queensland, she is a member of Viking Athletics. A beach sprinter, Mannix-Power is a Northcliffe Surf Club lifesaver and became a three-time Australian Female Open beach sprint champion, successfully defending her title in 2023. In April 2024, Mannix-Power won Stawell Gift in 13.42 ahead of Chloe Kinnersley and Jemma Pollard.

Mannix-Power was suspended between April and August 2025 following a drug test completed at the Surf Life Saving Australia (SLSA) National Championships, which returned an Adverse Analytical Finding for Benzoylecgonine, a metabolite of Cocaine.

In March 2026, she won the 100 m at the Adelaide Invitational. At the event, she was also part of a women's 4 x 100 metres relay team which set a meeting record at the Adelaide Invitational, alongside Ebony Lane, Olivia Rose Inkster and Monique Hanlon. She placed second to Ebony Lane over 100 m at the Maurie Plant Meet later that month. On 11 April 2026, she was runner-up to Georgia Harris in the final of 100 metres at the 2026 Australian Athletics Championships, running 11.52 seconds. She was selected for the Australian team to compete at the 2026 World Athletics Relays in Gaborone, Botswana. She was selected to run the mixed 4 x 100 metres relay alongside Lakara Stallan, Jai Gordon and Calab Law with the team running 40.78 seconds on the opening day. The following day, the quartet won their heat to successfully qualify for the 2027 World Championships. She was selected as part of the Australian team for the 2026 Commonwealth Games in Glasgow, Scotland, Later at the Games, and competed in the women's 4 × 100 m relay.
