= Luxembourg at the 2009 World Championships in Athletics =

- WA code: LUX

in Berlin
- Competitors: 1
- Medals: Gold 0 Silver 0 Bronze 0 Total 0

World Championships in Athletics appearances
- 1976; 1980; 1983; 1987; 1991; 1993; 1995; 1997; 1999; 2001; 2003; 2005; 2007; 2009; 2011; 2013; 2015; 2017; 2019; 2022; 2023

Luxembourg competed at the 2009 World Championships in Athletics from 15–23 August in Berlin, entering only one athlete into the competition: 800 metres runner Mike Schumacher.

== Team selection ==
Track and road events

Event	Athletes	
Event	Men	Women
800 metres	Mike Schumacher	

== Results ==
Event	Athletes	Heat Round 1		Semifinal		Final	
Event	Athletes	Result	Rank	Result	Rank	Result	Rank
800 m	Mike Schumacher	1:48.18 PB	30	did not advance			
