= Rachel Abrams (athlete) =

Northern Mariana Islands sprinter

Personal information
- Nationality: Northern Mariana Islands
- Born: 13 July 1995 (age 30)

Sport
- Sport: Athletics
- Event(s): 60 m, 100 m

Achievements and titles
- Personal best(s): 8.30 s (60 m); 13.05 s (100 m)
Medal record
Women's athletics
Representing Northern Mariana Islands
Micronesian Games
Gold medal – first place	2014 Palikir	200 m
Gold medal – first place	2014 Palikir	100 m hurdles
Gold medal – first place	2014 Palikir	High jump
Silver medal – second place	2014 Palikir	100 m
Silver medal – second place	2014 Palikir	4×100 m relay

Rachel Abrams (born 13 July 1995) is a sprinter from the Northern Mariana Islands.

She first competed internationally in the 60 metres at the 2012 IAAF World Indoor Championships in Istanbul where set a personal best time of 8.31 seconds. Four months later she competed in the 100 metres at the 2012 World Junior Championships in Athletics in Barcelona. Racing three days before her 17th birthday, Abrams set a new personal best of 13.05 seconds.

In 2014, she raced in the 60 metres at the World Indoor Championships when shaved 0.01 seconds off her personal best and in July she won five medals at the Micronesian Games in Palikir, Federated States of Micronesia. She won the 200 metre event in new Games record time of 26.29 seconds, the 100 m hurdles in 17.50 seconds and the high jump in 1.38 metres. Her two silver medals were won in the 100 metres and the 4 × 100 m relay. She also finished 8th in the shot put.
