= McCaffrey Gilmete =

Sprinter

Personal information
- Nationality: Federated States of Micronesia
- Born: 3 August 1990 (age 35)

Sport
- Sport: Track and field
- Event: 100m

McCaffrey Gilmete (born 3 August 1990) is a sprinter representing the Federated States of Micronesia. He competed in the 100 metres event at the 2013 World Championships in Athletics.
