= John Gregorek Jr. =

American middle-distance runner

Johnny Gregorek Jr.
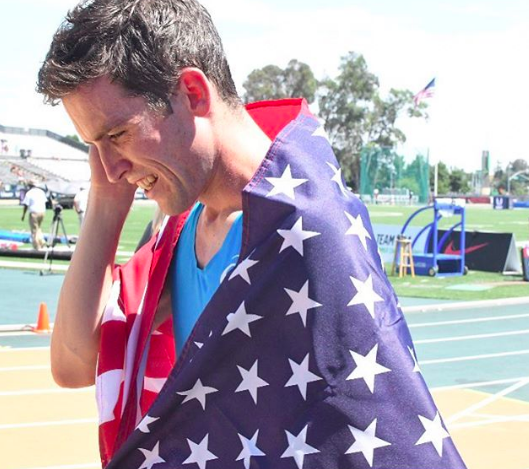
- Johnny Gregorek

Personal information
- Born: December 7, 1991 (age 34) Seekonk, Massachusetts, U.S.
- Height: 6 ft (183 cm)
- Weight: 149 lb (68 kg)

Sport
- Sport: Track
- Events: 1500 meters, Mile, 800 meters
- College team: Columbia University, Oregon Ducks
- Club: Asics/New Jersey-New York TC
- Turned pro: 2015

Achievements and titles
- World finals: 10th, London 2017
- Personal best: 1500m-3:35.00 1 Mile-3:49.98
Medal record
Pan American Games
Silver medal – second place	2019 Lima	1500 m
- Updated on 8/11/2019

Johnny Gregorek Jr. (born December 7, 1991) is an American middle-distance runner. He competed in the 2017 World Championships in the 1500, where he placed 10th in a time of 3:37.56. As of May 2020, Gregorek holds the world record for the fastest Blue Jean Mile, ran in a time of 4:06.25.

== Running career ==
Gregorek was raised in Seekonk, Massachusetts, where he helped Seekonk High School win the state cross country title. He earned a degree from Columbia University in 2014, then, taking advantage of an NCAA rule which allows athletes to transfer to another school for a fifth year of competition, joined the Oregon Ducks.

Gregorek finished in 6th place at the 2016 US Olympic Trials. In 2017, he qualified for the World Championships in London for 1500m, where he finished 10th, following his 3rd-place finish at the US Championships. In 2019, he ran 3:49.98 for 1 mile at Boston University, making his time second on the All-Time American Indoor Mile list. He and his father share the record for the fastest father-son mile duo in world history.

== Personal Bests ==
Surface	Event	Time	Date	Venue	Notes
Outdoor track	800m	1:46.81	June 11, 2021	Coatesville, PA	
Outdoor track	1500m	3:34.49	July 25, 2021	Azusa, CA	
Outdoor track	One mile	3:52.94	June 13, 2019	Bislett Stadium	
Outdoor track	One Mile Road	3:46.7	July 23, 2022	Cleveland, OH	Not Legal
Indoor track	1000m	2:19.78	January 26, 2019	The Armory	
Indoor track	One mile	3:49.98	March 3, 2019	Boston University	
Indoor track	3000m	7:49.93	January 28, 2017	New York, NY	

== Blue Jeans Mile ==
On May 30, 2020, Gregorek ran what is believed to be the fastest mile ever run by someone wearing blue jeans in 4 minutes and 6.25 seconds, beating the previous world record by five seconds. Gregorek ran the Blue Jean Mile wearing 100% cotton Levi's, while raising over $37,500 for the National Alliance on Mental Illness (NAMI). He ran the mile in memory of his younger brother Patrick, who died suddenly in March 2019 after struggling with mental health.

== Personal ==
Gregorek's father John Gregorek competed in steeplechase for the 1980 and 1984 Olympic teams. His mother, Christine Mullen, was an Olympic trials finalist and competed in the 1980s for Athletics West in Eugene, Oregon.

In January 2019, Gregorek married Amy Nunes.
