= Cameron Proceviat =

Canadian middle-distance runner

Personal information
- Full name: Cameron Proceviat
- Born: 20 September 1993 (age 32)

Sport
- Country: Canada
- Sport: Track and field
- Event: 1500 m

Achievements and titles
- Personal bests: Outdoor; 800 m: 1:48.23 (Edmonton 2022); 1500 m: 3:36.09 (Portland 2022); Mile: 3:56.13 (Los Angeles 2022); Indoor; 1500 m: 3:36.85 (Boston 2022); Mile: 3:52.54 (Boston 2022) NR; 3000 m: 7:47.03 (Boston 2022)

Cameron Proceviat (born 20 September 1993) is a Canadian middle-distance runner.

Proceviat was selected to compete for Canada at the 2022 World Athletics Championships in Oregon in the 1500m event. Proceviat is also the Canadian record holder in the indoor mile event, recording a 3:52.54 in 2022. He holds a 1500m personal best of 3:36.09, set in 2022.

Proceviat also serves as a part-time coach with Simon Fraser University.
