= William Paulson (runner) =

Canadian middle-distance runner

Personal information
- Born: 17 November 1994 (age 31) Tetbury, Gloucestershire, England
- Education: Pate's Grammar School; Princeton University; Arizona State University

Sport
- Sport: Track and field
- Event: 1500 m
- College team: Arizona State Sun Devils
- Club: Oregon Track Club
- Turned pro: 2020

Achievements and titles
- Personal bests: Outdoor; 1500 m: 3:33.97 (Azusa 2022); Mile: 3:52.42 (Eugene 2022); 5000 metres: 13:40.32 (San Juan Capistrano 2020)
Medal record
Representing Canada
Pan American Games
| Bronze medal – third place | 2019 Lima | 1500 m |

William Paulson (born 17 November 1994) is a middle-distance runner who competed for Great Britain and Canada.

== Biography ==
Paulson has dual Canadian-British citizenship, thanks to his French-Canadian mother and British father. Paulson was born in the UK and grew up in Tetbury, Gloucestershire and attended Leighterton Primary School and Pate's Grammar School, before going to Princeton for an undergraduate degree in biology. Paulson signed on to a one-year master's program at Arizona State University in Phoenix.

Paulson finished runner-up behind Charlie Grice at the 2014 British Athletics Championships.

After competing in the NCAA he finished fifth in the indoor mile and fifth in the outdoor 1,500m in 2019. Paulson holds the Arizona State University record for fastest mile, running a time of 3:58.07 indoors in February 2019. Paulson won the Canadian 1,500m title in 2019 and also won a bronze medal at the 2019 Pan American Games. In 2020, he turned professional with the Oregon Track Club.

In 2022, Paulson competed in the 1500m track event at the Commonwealth Games, placing tenth out of twelve.
