= Northern Marianas Athletics =

- Sport: Athletics
- Abbreviation: NMA
- Founded: 1980
- Affiliation: IAAF
- Affiliation date: 1989
- Regional affiliation: OAA
- Headquarters: Susupe, Saipan
- President: Ray Tebuteb
- Vice president: Lia Rangamar
- Secretary: Robin Sapong-Eugenio
- (Northern Mariana Islands)

Northern Marianas Athletics (NMA), also known as the Northern Marianas Athletics Association or Northern Mariana Islands Track and Field Federation, is the governing body for the sport of athletics in the Northern Mariana Islands.

== History ==
Athletes from the Northern Marianas participated already at the 1969 Micronesian Games, (the Northern Marianas then still being part of the Trust Territory of the Pacific Islands,) and at the 1975 South Pacific Games as part of a combined Micronesia team.

The foundation of NMA is reported for 1980, as well as its affiliation to the IAAF in the year 1989.

Kurt Barnes served as president of NMA until he stepped down in 2009.

Current president is former congressman Ray Tebuteb.

== Affiliations ==
- International Association of Athletics Federations (IAAF)
- Oceania Athletics Association (OAA)

Moreover, it is part of the following national organisations:

- Northern Marianas Sports Association (NMSA)

== National records ==
NMA maintains the Northern Mariana Islands records in athletics.
