= Oceania Athletics Association =

Oceania athletics governing body

- Jurisdiction: Oceania
- Membership: 20 member + 3 associate member federations
- Abbreviation: Oceania Athletics
- Founded: 1969
- Affiliation: World Athletics
- Headquarters: Varsity Lakes, Gold Coast, Queensland, Australia
- President: Robin Sapong-Eugenio

Official website
- athletics-oceania.com

The Oceania Athletics Association (OAA; more commonly known as Oceania Athletics) is the governing body for athletics in Oceania. It is one of the six Area Associations of the world's athletics governing body World Athletics. Oceania Athletics has 23 members (including 3 associate members) and is headquartered in the Gold Coast.

== History ==
The OAA was founded as Oceania Amateur Athletic Organization (OAAA) on August 21, 1969, during a "Congress of the delegates of Member Countries of the Australasian Area" held in Port Moresby, then Territory of Papua and New Guinea, at the time of the 3rd South Pacific Games. Six out of the nine Member Federations attended (Australia, Nauru, Papua New Guinea, Tonga, New Hebrides, now called Vanuatu, and Western Samoa, now Samoa). Fiji and New Zealand sent letters of support, while the Cook Islands were not represented. Observers from American Samoa, Solomon Islands, French Polynesia, Guam and New Caledonia also attended.

From this Congress a Committee of four members (non-elected) was formed to set up a draft of rules for the new Association, whose name today is Oceania Athletics Association. These members were: Arthur Hodsdon (Australia) as Chairman, Clive Lee (Australia), James Dunn (Papua New Guinea) and an unnamed New Zealander. From that year onwards the Association has been elected by Member Federations. The name was changed to Oceania Athletics Association (OAA) in February 2007.

== Members and governance ==
Oceania Athletics' governance is split between the main bodies:

- The Congress, which is the general assembly of the Members and the supreme authority of the Oceanian Athletic Association;
- The Council, with the Executive Board and its President; and
- The Commissions.

=== Membership ===
Oceania Athletics now has 20 members and 3 associate members. Each member gets one vote at the Congress.

Nation	Federation	Link
Full members
American Samoa	American Samoa Track & Field Association	
Australia	Athletics Australia	
Cook Islands	Athletics Cook Islands Inc.	
Fiji	Athletics Fiji	
French Polynesia	Fédération d'athlétisme de Polynésie française	
Guam	Guam Track and Field Association	
Kiribati	Kiribati Athletics Association	
Marshall Islands	Marshall Islands Athletics	
Micronesia	Federated States of Micronesia Athletic Association	
Nauru	Athletics Nauru	
New Zealand	Athletics New Zealand	
Norfolk Island	Athletics Norfolk Island	
Northern Mariana Islands	Northern Marianas Athletics	
Palau	Palau Track and Field Association	
Papua New Guinea	Athletics Papua New Guinea	
Samoa	Athletics Samoa	
Solomon Islands	Athletic Solomons	
Tonga	Tonga Athletic Association	
Tuvalu	Tuvalu Athletics Association	
Vanuatu	Vanuatu Athletics Federation	
Associate members
New Caledonia	Ligue de la Nouvelle-Calédonie d'athlétisme	
Niue	Niue Athletics Association	
Wallis and Futuna	Comité territorial d'athlétisme de Wallis et Futuna	

==== Associate member associations ====
A modification of Article 4.2 of World Athletics constitution set new rules limiting its membership as follows: "The national governing body for Athletics in any Country or Territory shall be eligible for Membership. Members that represented Territories on 31 December 2005 shall continue to be Members. No new Territories shall be admitted to the Membership."

As a consequence, the OAA made constitutional amendments to its Article 2.5, introducing an associate membership to allow territories like New Caledonia, Niue, and Wallis and Futuna to participate officially "in OAA activities, including area and regional competitions". This also applies for Tokelau, where the first athletics event ever took place recently.

In 2008, New Caledonia became the first associate member, Niue followed in 2009.

=== Presidents ===
The current president of the association, Robin Sapong Eugenios (Northern Marianas) was firstly elected in December 2019 at the OAA Special Congress.

Name	Country	Presidency
Arthur Hodsdon	Australia	1969–1978
Lee Morrison	Australia	1978–1985
Clive Lee	Australia	1985–1991
Peter Anderson	Papua New Guinea	1991–1995
Viliame S Tunidau	Fiji	1995–1999
Anne Tierney	Cook Islands	1999–2007
Geoff Gardner	Norfolk Island	2007–2019
Robin Sapong-Eugenio	Northern Mariana Islands	2019–present

== Competitions ==
There are four broad categories under which competitions are held:

- Senior : all athletes minimum 16 years old;
- Para : all athletes with a disability minimum 16 years old;
- U20 : athletes aged 16 to 19 years on 31 December of the year of the competition;
- U18 : athletes aged 16 to 17 years on 31 December of the year of the competition.

The OAA organizes several official competitions at the Oceanian level:

- Oceania Athletics Championships
- Oceania U20 Athletics Championships
- Oceania U18 Athletics Championships
- Oceania Combined Events Championships
- Oceania Cross Country Championships
- Oceania Marathon and Half Marathon Championships
- Oceania Race Walking Championships
- Oceania Para Athletics Championships
- Oceania Athletics Cup

Moreover, the following sub-regional championships are/were organized:

- Melanesian Championships
- Micronesian Championships
- Polynesian Championships

In 2011, a new regional concept was introduced, and the three regional championships and the Oceania Championships were unified to the Oceania Regional (or Area) Championships, or simply again Oceania Championships. Two regions "East" and "West" were classified. Athletes from the two regions may compete together at the championships, but results will be separated for rankings purposes, and medals are awarded separately.

== See also ==
- Oceania Masters Athletics
