= Yvonne Bennett =

Sprinter

Personal information
- Nationality: Northern Mariana Islander
- Born: 29 July 1990 (age 35)

Sport
- Sport: Track and field
- Event: 100m

Yvonne Bennett (born 29 July 1990) is a Northern Mariana Islander sprinter. She competed in the 100 metres event at the 2011 World Championships in Athletics.
