= Zarinae Sapong =

Northern Mariana Islands sprinter

Personal information
- Born: 27 January 1998 (age 27)

Sport
- Sport: Athletics
- Event(s): 60 m, 100 m

Zarinae Sapong (born 27 January 1998) is a sprinter from the Northern Mariana Islands. She represented her country at three outdoor and two indoor World Championships.

Sapong competed at the 2022 World Athletics Championships in Eugene, Oregon. She ran a sub 13-second personal best but did not progress to the next round.

== International competitions ==
Year	Competition	Venue	Position	Event	Notes
Representing Northern Mariana Islands
2014	Micronesian Games	Palikir, Federated States of Micronesia	15th (h)	100 m	13.96
2014	Micronesian Games	Palikir, Federated States of Micronesia	5th	200 m	28.55
2014	Micronesian Games	Palikir, Federated States of Micronesia	4th	400 m	68.49
2014	Micronesian Games	Palikir, Federated States of Micronesia	2nd	4 × 100 m relay	53.87
2014	Micronesian Games	Palikir, Federated States of Micronesia	7th	Long jump	3.77 m
2015	World Youth Championships	Cali, Colombia	58th (h)	100 m	13.62
2016	World Indoor Championships	Portland, United States	43rd (h)	60 m	8.70
2016	Micronesian Championships	Kolonia, Federated States of Micronesia	1st	100 m	13.35
2016	Micronesian Championships	Kolonia, Federated States of Micronesia	1st	200 m	27.87
2016	Micronesian Championships	Kolonia, Federated States of Micronesia	2nd	400 m	68.80
2016	World U20 Championships	Bydgoszcz, Poland	44th (h)	100 m	13.36 (w)
2017	World Championships	London, United Kingdom	45th (h)	100 m	13.29
2018	World Indoor Championships	Birmingham, United Kingdom	47th (h)	60 m	8.54
2019	World Championships	Doha, Qatar	47th (h)	100 m	13.14
2022	World Championships	Eugene, Oregon	46th (h)	100 m	12.98
2023	World Championships	Budapest, Hungary	51st (h)	100 m	13.04
2024	World Indoor Championships	Glasgow, United Kingdom	52nd (h)	60 m	8.44

== Personal bests ==
Outdoor

- 100 metres – 12.98 (+0.1 m/s, Eugene 2022)
- 200 metres – 27.40 (-0.7 m/s, Apia 2019)

Indoor

- 60 metres – 8.33 (Glasgow 2024)
