= Northern Mariana Islands at the 2011 World Aquatics Championships =

Sporting event delegation

Flag of Northern Mariana Islands

Northern Mariana Islands competed at the 2011 World Aquatics Championships in Shanghai, China between July 16 and 31, 2011.

== Swimming ==
Northern Mariana Islands qualified 3 swimmers.

Men

Athlete	Event	Heats		Semifinals		Final	
Athlete	Event	Time	Rank	Time	Rank	Time	Rank
Eli Ebenezer Wong	Men's 200m Breaststroke	2:23.35	46	did not advance			
Eli Ebenezer Wong	Men's 200m IM	2:10.18	43	did not advance			

Women

Athlete	Event	Heats		Semifinals		Final	
Athlete	Event	Time	Rank	Time	Rank	Time	Rank
Grace Kimball	Women's 50m Freestyle	30.94	65	did not advance			
Grace Kimball	Women's 100m Freestyle	1:09.70	72	did not advance			
Victoria Chentsova	Women's 200m Freestyle	2:27.86	47	did not advance			
Victoria Chentsova	Women's 400m Freestyle	5:18.67	36			did not advance	
