= Flag of the Northern Mariana Islands =

Northern Mariana Islands
- Use: National flag and ensign
- Design: A blue field with a white five-pointed star superimposed on a gray latte stone encircled by a multicolored lei

The national flag of the United States commonwealth of the Northern Mariana Islands is a blue field, with a white five-pointed star superimposed on a gray latte stone encircled by a multicolored lei. It was originally adopted in 1972 without the lei. The current version of the flag was first flown July 4, 1976, with slight changes made to the flag in 1991 and 1995. The blue field represents the Pacific Ocean, the white star represents the commonwealth, and the latte stone and lei represent Chamorro and Carolinian culture, endemic to the island chain.

== Design and symbolism ==
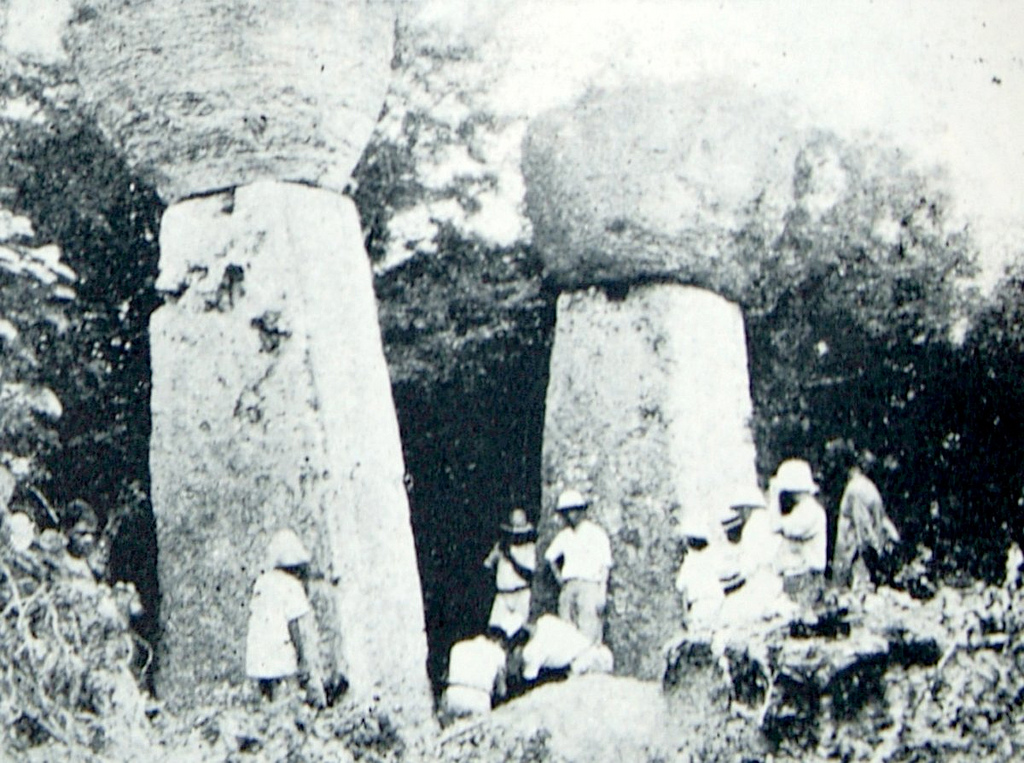
Latte stones at the House of Taga

It consists of a blue field, with a white five-pointed star superimposed on a gray latte stone, which is a kind of traditional building support used by the Chamorro people. The latte stone and star are encircled by a traditional floral lei (head wreath) called the mwáár. The lei is white, entwined with multicolored ylang-ylang, plumeria, angagha, and teibwo flowers, as well as shells. The flag's proportions are officially 20:39, often rendered as 2:3 or 3:5.

The flag of the Northern Mariana Islands is defined by Article XXII (22) of the Constitution of the Commonwealth of the Northern Mariana Islands, which states:

The official flag of the Commonwealth shall consist, on both sides of a rectangular field of blue, a white star in the center, superimposed on a gray latte stone, surrounded by the traditional Carolinian mwáár. The dimensions of the flag, the mwáár, the star and latte stone shall be provided by law.

The flag's symbolism draws from the islands' political geography and native culture. The blue field represents the Pacific Ocean, and the star represents the commonwealth, together, representing the island chain. The latte stone and lei are pieces of Chamorro culture, with the stone honoring Chief Taga, and the lei being a symbol of the Chamorro and Carolinian people, who are both native to the islands. The flowers and shells in the lei and the stone used in the latte represent the natural resources of the islands.

== History ==
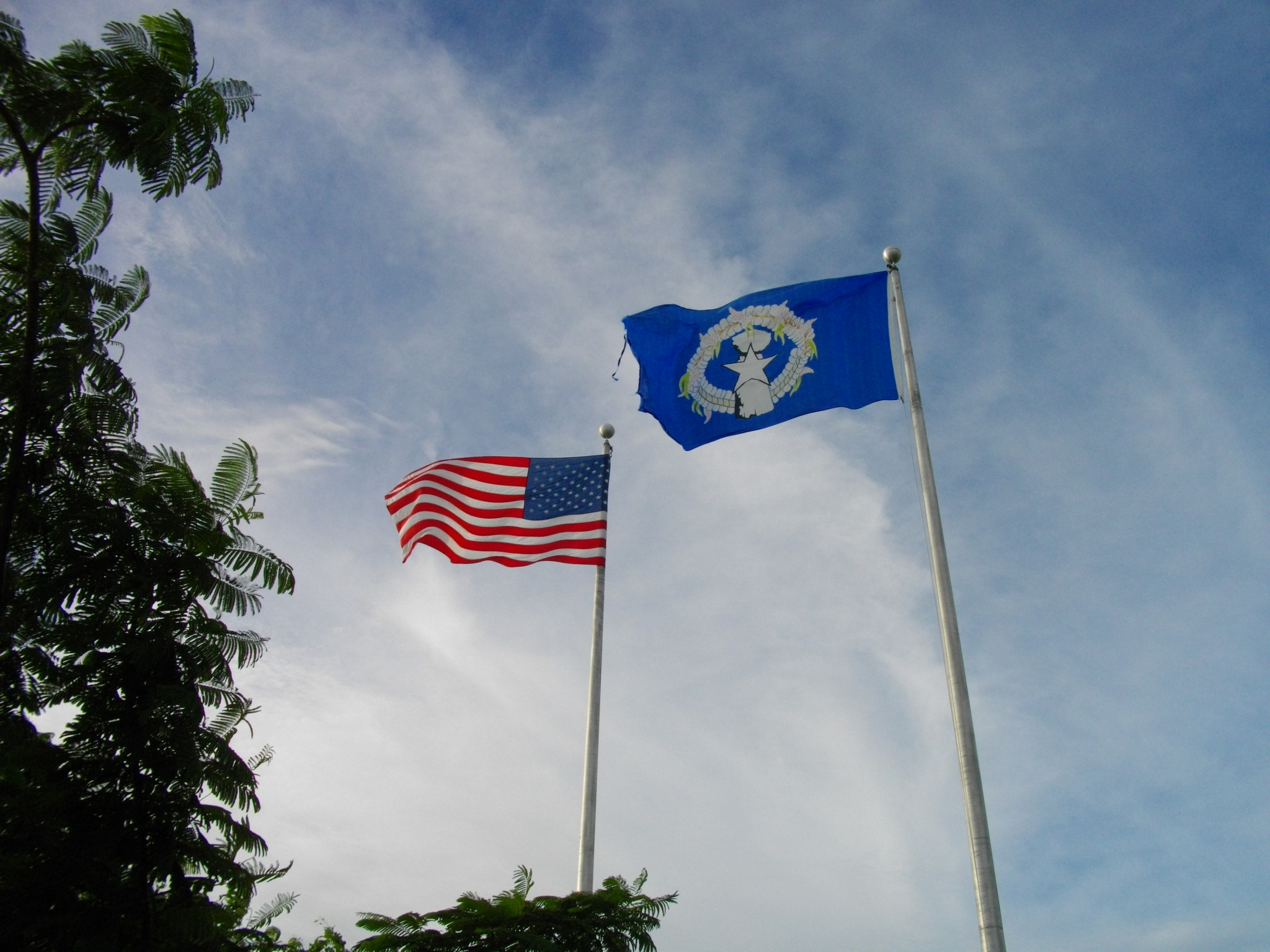
The U.S. and Northern Mariana Islands flags flying side-by-side

The territory's first flag was designed in March 1972 and adopted the same year. It consisted of a blue field with a white star on a latte stone, without the lei. This flag was first flown July 4, 1976. During this time, the Northern Mariana Islands were part of the United Nations Trust Territory of the Pacific Islands, reflected in the use of the color blue.

The version with the lei was adopted on July 1, 1989. The islands had become a United States commonwealth a few years earlier, and the new design was part of the territory's identity shift. It was exhibited at the North American Vexillological Association's 13th International Congress of Vexillology in Melbourne, Australia in 1989. Slight changes were made to the flag in 1991 and 1995.

== See also ==
- Seal of the Northern Mariana Islands
- Flag of the Trust Territory of the Pacific Islands
- Flags of the U.S. states
