= List of flag bearers for Palau at the Olympics =

Palau at the Olympics
- IOC code: PLW
- NOC: Palau National Olympic Committee
- Website: www.oceaniasport.com/palau
- Medals: Gold 0 Silver 0 Bronze 0 Total 0

Summer appearances
- 2000; 2004; 2008; 2012; 2016; 2020; 2024

This is a list of flag bearers who have represented Palau at the Olympics. Flag bearers carry the national flag of their country at the opening ceremony of the Olympic Games.

#	Event year	Season	Flag bearer	Sport
1	2000	Summer	Valerie Pedro	Weightlifting
2	2004	Summer	John Tarkong Jr.	Wrestling
3	2008	Summer	Elgin Loren Elwais	Wrestling
4	2012	Summer	Rodman Teltull	Athletics
5	2016	Summer	Florian Skilang Temengil	Wrestling
6	2020	Summer	Osisang Chilton	Swimming
6	2020	Summer	Adrian Ililau	Athletics
7	2024	Summer	Jion Hosei	Swimming
7	2024	Summer	Sydney Francisco	Athletics

== See also ==
- Palau at the Olympics
