= Palau at the Olympics =

- IOC code: PLW
- NOC: Palau National Olympic Committee
- Website: www.oceaniasport.com/palau
- Medals: Gold 0 Silver 0 Bronze 0 Total 0

Summer appearances
- 2000; 2004; 2008; 2012; 2016; 2020; 2024; 2028

Palau made its debut at the Summer Olympic Games in 2000 in Sydney. From 2000 to 2024, 30 Palauans have competed in the Summer Olympics, 15 men and 15 women. None have as yet participated in the Winter Olympic Games. As one of the least-populated competing nations, it is one of over 50 that have never won an Olympic medal.

== Olympians ==
=== 2000 ===
Christopher Adolf was a member of the first Palauan Olympic team, finishing 8th in his heat in the men's 100 metres. Peoria Koshiba ran the women's 100 metres in both 2000 and 2008.

Nicole Hayes competed in the women's 100 metre freestyle. Anlloyd Samuel swam the men's 50 metre freestyle.

Valerie Pedro finished 14th in the women's weightlifting competition in the 69 kg class.

=== 2004 ===
Ngerak Florencio competed in the women's 100 metres Russell Roman ran in the men's 200 metres.

Evelyn Otto swam in the women's 50 metre freestyle and was Palau's flagbearer at the closing ceremony.

John Tarkong Jr. wrestled in the men's Greco-Roman competition in the 96 kg class.

=== 2008 ===
As noted above, this was Peoria Koshiba's second competition in the women's 100 metres. Jesse Tamangrow ran the men's 100 metres.

Amber Yobech swam in the women's 50 metre freestyle.

In wrestling, Elgin Elwais fought in the men's Greco-Roman 55 kg class, while Florian Temengil contested the men's freestyle at 120 kg.

=== 2012 ===
Ruby Joy Gabriel ran in the women's 100 metres, while Rodman Teltull contested the same distance for the men.

Jennifer Anson was tied for 17th in judo in the women's 63 kg class.

Keesha Keane swam the women's 50 metre freestyle.

Stevick Patris placed 13th in the men's 62 kg weightlifting event.

=== 2016 ===
Shawn Dingilius-Wallace competed in the men's 50 metre freestyle, finishing 72nd. Dirngulbai Misech swam in the women's 50 metre freestyle.

Rodman Tultill again competed in the 100 metres.

Marina Toribiong raced in two individual K-1 kayaking events, at 200 and 500 metres, finishing 24th and 27th, respectively.

Florian Temengil competed once again in the men's freestyle, this time at 125 kg.

=== 2020 ===
Adrian Ililau ran in the men's 100 metres.

Shawn Dingilius-Wallace swam again in the men's 50 metre freestyle, improving slightly to 67th. Osisang Chilton competed in the women's 50 metre freestyle.

=== 2024 ===
Sydney Francisco ran in the women's 100 metres.

Jion Hosei swam in the men's 50 metre freestyle and was the flagbearer at both the opening and closing ceremony. Yuri Hosei, Jion's sister, competed in the women's 50 metre freestyle.

== Medal tables ==
=== Medals by Summer Games ===
| Games | Athletes | Gold | Silver | Bronze | Total | Rank |
| (Australia) 2000 Sydney | 5 | 0 | 0 | 0 | 0 | – |
| (Greece) 2004 Athens | 4 | 0 | 0 | 0 | 0 | – |
| (China) 2008 Beijing | 5 | 0 | 0 | 0 | 0 | – |
| (United Kingdom) 2012 London | 5 | 0 | 0 | 0 | 0 | – |
| (Brazil) 2016 Rio de Janeiro | 5 | 0 | 0 | 0 | 0 | – |
| (Japan) 2020 Tokyo | 3 | 0 | 0 | 0 | 0 | – |
| (France) 2024 Paris | 3 | 0 | 0 | 0 | 0 | – |
| (United States) 2028 Los Angeles | future event | | | | | |
| (Australia) 2032 Brisbane | future event | | | | | |
| Total | | 0 | 0 | 0 | 0 | – |

== See also ==
- List of flag bearers for Palau at the Olympics
