= Palau at the 2022 World Aquatics Championships =

- Flag of Palau
- World Aquatics code: PLW
- National federation: Palau Swimming Association

in Budapest, Hungary
- Competitors: 3 in 1 sport
- Medals: Gold 0 Silver 0 Bronze 0 Total 0

World Aquatics Championships appearances
- 1973; 1975; 1978; 1982; 1986; 1991; 1994; 1998; 2001; 2003; 2005; 2007; 2009; 2011; 2013; 2015; 2017; 2019; 2022; 2023; 2024; 2025

Palau competed at the 2022 World Aquatics Championships in Budapest, Hungary from 18 June to 3 July.

== Swimming ==
Palauan swimmers have achieved qualifying standards in the following events.

Athlete	Event	Heat		Semifinal		Final	
Athlete	Event	Time	Rank	Time	Rank	Time	Rank
Jion Hosei	Men's 50 m breaststroke	34.92	54	did not advance			
Jion Hosei	Men's 100 m breaststroke	1:18.51	60	did not advance			
Travis Dui Sakurai	Men's 50 m freestyle	26.57	80	did not advance			
Travis Dui Sakurai	Men's 100 m freestyle	59.63	93	did not advance			
Yuri Hosei	Women's 50 m freestyle	32.05	77	did not advance			
Yuri Hosei	Women's 100 m freestyle	1:11.34	59	did not advance			
