= Palau at the 2017 World Aquatics Championships =

- Flag of Palau
- FINA code: PLW
- National federation: Palau Swimming Association

in Budapest, Hungary
- Competitors: 3 in 1 sport
- Medals: Gold 0 Silver 0 Bronze 0 Total 0

World Aquatics Championships appearances
- 1973; 1975; 1978; 1982; 1986; 1991; 1994; 1998; 2001; 2003; 2005; 2007; 2009; 2011; 2013; 2015; 2017; 2019; 2022; 2023; 2024

Palau competed at the 2017 World Aquatics Championships in Budapest, Hungary from 14 July to 30 July.

== Swimming ==
Palau has received a Universality invitation from FINA to send three swimmers (two men and one woman) to the World Championships.

Athlete	Event	Heat		Semifinal		Final	
Athlete	Event	Time	Rank	Time	Rank	Time	Rank
Shawn Dingilius-Wallace	Men's 50 m freestyle	26.95	111	did not advance			
Shawn Dingilius-Wallace	Men's 100 m freestyle	58.81	105	did not advance			
Noel Keane	Men's 200 m freestyle	2:06.03	71	did not advance			
Noel Keane	Men's 200 m individual medley	2:18.66	42	did not advance			
Osisang Chilton	Women's 200 m freestyle	2:25.83	50	did not advance			
Osisang Chilton	Women's 200 m backstroke	2:46.60	32	did not advance			
