= Palau at the 2024 World Aquatics Championships =

- Flag of Palau
- FINA code: PLW
- National federation: Palau Swimming Association

in Doha, Qatar
- Competitors: 4 in 1 sport
- Medals: Gold 0 Silver 0 Bronze 0 Total 0

World Aquatics Championships appearances
- 1973; 1975; 1978; 1982; 1986; 1991; 1994; 1998; 2001; 2003; 2005; 2007; 2009; 2011; 2013; 2015; 2017; 2019; 2022; 2023; 2024

Palau competed at the 2024 World Aquatics Championships in Doha, Qatar from 2 to 18 February.

== Swimming ==
Palau entered 4 swimmers.

Men

Athlete	Event	Heat		Semifinal		Final	
Athlete	Event	Time	Rank	Time	Rank	Time	Rank
Jion Hosei	50 metre breaststroke	33.61	53	Did not advance			
Jion Hosei	100 metre breaststroke	1:16.30	74	Did not advance			
Travis Dui Sakurai	50 metre freestyle	25.83	88	Did not advance			
Travis Dui Sakurai	50 metre butterfly	28.02	54	Did not advance			

Women

Athlete	Event	Heat		Semifinal		Final	
Athlete	Event	Time	Rank	Time	Rank	Time	Rank
Yuri Hosei	50 metre freestyle	31.41	95	Did not advance			
Yuri Hosei	100 metre freestyle	1:09.06	78	Did not advance			
Galyah Mikel	200 metre freestyle	2:37.22	50	Did not advance			
Galyah Mikel	50 metre butterfly	35.60	52	Did not advance			
