= Palau at the 2023 World Aquatics Championships =

- Flag of Palau
- FINA code: PLW
- National federation: Palau Swimming Association

in Fukuoka, Japan
- Competitors: 4 in 1 sport
- Medals: Gold 0 Silver 0 Bronze 0 Total 0

World Aquatics Championships appearances
- 1973; 1975; 1978; 1982; 1986; 1991; 1994; 1998; 2001; 2003; 2005; 2007; 2009; 2011; 2013; 2015; 2017; 2019; 2022; 2023; 2024

Palau is set to compete at the 2023 World Aquatics Championships in Fukuoka, Japan from 14 to 30 July.

== Swimming ==
Palau entered 4 swimmers.

Men

Athlete	Event	Heat		Semifinal		Final	
Athlete	Event	Time	Rank	Time	Rank	Time	Rank
Jion Hosei	50 metre breaststroke	35.01	57	Did not advance			
Jion Hosei	100 metre breaststroke	1:17.05	68	Did not advance			
Travis Dui Sakurai	50 metre freestyle	26.22	96	Did not advance			
Travis Dui Sakurai	100 metre freestyle	57.86	105	Did not advance			

Women

Athlete	Event	Heat		Semifinal		Final	
Athlete	Event	Time	Rank	Time	Rank	Time	Rank
Yuri Hosei	50 metre freestyle	32.14	92	Did not advance			
Yuri Hosei	100 metre freestyle	1:10.20	74	Did not advance			
Galyah Mikel	200 metre freestyle	2:43.01	64	Did not advance			
Galyah Mikel	50 metre butterfly	38.22	62	Did not advance			

Mixed

Athlete	Event	Heat		Final	
Athlete	Event	Time	Rank	Time	Rank
Jion Hosei; Travis Dui Sakurai; Galyah Mikel; Yuri Hosei	4 × 100 m freestyle relay	4:17.91	43	Did not advance	
