= Palau at the 2013 World Aquatics Championships =

- Flag of Palau
- FINA code: PLW
- National federation: Palau Swimming Association

in Barcelona, Spain
- Competitors: 3 in 1 sports
- Medals: Gold 0 Silver 0 Bronze 0 Total 0

World Aquatics Championships appearances
- 1973; 1975; 1978; 1982; 1986; 1991; 1994; 1998; 2001; 2003; 2005; 2007; 2009; 2011; 2013; 2015; 2017; 2019; 2022; 2023; 2024

Palau competed at the 2013 World Aquatics Championships in Barcelona, Spain between 19 July and 4 August 2013.

== Swimming ==
Palauan swimmers achieved qualifying standards in the following events (up to a maximum of 2 swimmers in each event at the A-standard entry time, and 1 at the B-standard):

Men

Athlete	Event	Heat		Semifinal		Final	
Athlete	Event	Time	Rank	Time	Rank	Time	Rank
Shawn Dingilius	50 m freestyle	28.38	92	did not advance			
Shawn Dingilius	100 m freestyle	1:02.27	82	did not advance			

Women

Athlete	Event	Heat		Semifinal		Final	
Athlete	Event	Time	Rank	Time	Rank	Time	Rank
Osisang Chilton	50 m backstroke	34.60	50	did not advance			
Osisang Chilton	50 m butterfly	33.92	57	did not advance			
Dirngulbai Misech	50 m freestyle	30.22	71	did not advance			
Dirngulbai Misech	100 m freestyle	1:09.46	68	did not advance			
