= Palau at the 2023 World Athletics Championships =

- Flag of Palau
- WA code: PLW

in Budapest, Hungary 19 August 2023 – 27 August 2023
- Competitors: 1 (0 men and 1 woman)
- Medals: Gold 0 Silver 0 Bronze 0 Total 0

World Athletics Championships appearances
- 1997; 1999; 2001; 2003; 2005; 2007; 2009; 2011; 2013; 2015; 2017; 2019; 2022; 2023; 2025

Palau competed at the 2023 World Athletics Championships in Budapest, Hungary, which were held from 19 to 27 August 2023. The athlete delegation of the country was composed of one competitor, sprinter Sydney Francisco, who competed in the women's 100 metres. She qualified for the Championships upon being selected by the Palau Track and Field Association. In the preliminary heats, she placed seventh in her heat and set a new personal best, failing to advance further.

== Background ==
The 2023 World Athletics Championships in Budapest, Hungary, were held from 19 to 27 August 2023. The Championships were held at the National Athletics Centre. To qualify for the World Championships, athletes had to reach an entry standard (e.g. time or distance), place in a specific position at select competitions, be a wild card entry, or qualify through their World Athletics Ranking at the end of the qualification period.

As Palau did not meet any of the four standards, they could send either one male or one female athlete in one event of the Championships who has not yet qualified. The Palau Track and Field Association selected sprinter Sydney Francisco, who would compete in the women's 100 metres. At the time of her selection, she held a personal best of 13.80 seconds set in the U18 division of the 2022 Oceania Athletics Championships held in Mackay, Australia.

== Results ==
Key

- Q = Qualified for the next round
- q = Qualified for the next round as a fastest loser or, in field events, by position without achieving the qualifying target
- NR = National record
- PB = Personal best
- SB = Season best
- N/A = Round not applicable for the event

=== Women ===
Francisco competed in the fifth preliminary heat of the women's 100 metres on 20 August against seven other sprinters, including eventual world champion Sha'Carri Richardson of the United States. There, Francisco recorded a time of 13.48 seconds for a new personal best and placed seventh, failing to advance further as only the top three of each heat and the three next fastest would be able to do so. After the race, she continued training with other athletes from Oceania and watched the finals of the event. She returned to Palau on 30 August.

Track and road events

Athlete	Event	Heat		Semifinal		Final	
Athlete	Event	Result	Rank	Result	Rank	Result	Rank
Sydney Francisco	100 metres	13.48 PB	7	Did not advance			
