= Palau at the 2020 Summer Olympics =

- IOC code: PLW
- NOC: Palau National Olympic Committee
- Website: www.oceaniasport.com/palau

in Tokyo, Japan July 23, 2021 – August 8, 2021
- Competitors: 3 in 2 sports
- Flag bearers (opening): Osisang Chilton; Adrian Ililau
- Flag bearer (closing): N/A
- Medals: Gold 0 Silver 0 Bronze 0 Total 0

Summer Olympics appearances (overview)
- 2000; 2004; 2008; 2012; 2016; 2020; 2024

Palau competed at the 2020 Summer Olympics in Tokyo. Originally scheduled to take place from 24 July to 9 August 2020, the Games have been postponed to 23 July to 8 August 2021, due to the COVID-19 pandemic. This was the nation's sixth consecutive appearance at the Summer Olympics.

== Competitors ==
The following is the list of number of competitors in the Games.

Sport	Men	Women	Total
Athletics	1	0	1
Swimming	1	1	2
Total	2	1	3

== Athletics ==
Palau received a universality slot from the World Athletics to send a male track and field athlete to the Olympics.

Key

- Note–Ranks given for track events are within the athlete's heat only
- Q = Qualified for the next round
- q = Qualified for the next round as a fastest loser or, in field events, by position without achieving the qualifying target
- NR = National record
- N/A = Round not applicable for the event
- Bye = Athlete not required to compete in round

Track & road events

Athlete	Event	Heat		Quarterfinal		Semifinal		Final	
Athlete	Event	Result	Rank	Result	Rank	Result	Rank	Result	Rank
Adrian Ililau	Men's 100 m	11.42 PB	8	Did not advance					

== Swimming ==
Palau received a universality invitation from FINA to send two top-ranked swimmers (one per gender) in their respective individual events to the Olympics, based on the FINA Points System of June 28, 2021.

Athlete	Event	Heat		Semifinal		Final	
Athlete	Event	Time	Rank	Time	Rank	Time	Rank
Shawn Dingilius-Wallace	Men's 50 m freestyle	27.46	67	Did not advance			
Osisang Chilton	Women's 50 m freestyle	30.67	73	Did not advance			
