= Palau at the 2019 World Aquatics Championships =

- Flag of Palau
- FINA code: PLW
- National federation: Palau Swimming Association

in Gwangju, South Korea
- Competitors: 4 in 1 sport
- Medals: Gold 0 Silver 0 Bronze 0 Total 0

World Aquatics Championships appearances
- 1973; 1975; 1978; 1982; 1986; 1991; 1994; 1998; 2001; 2003; 2005; 2007; 2009; 2011; 2013; 2015; 2017; 2019; 2022; 2023; 2024

Palau competed at the 2019 World Aquatics Championships in Gwangju, South Korea from 12 to 28 July.

== Swimming ==
Palau entered four swimmers.

Men

Athlete	Event	Heat		Semifinal		Final	
Athlete	Event	Time	Rank	Time	Rank	Time	Rank
Shawn Dingilius-Wallace	50 m freestyle	27.45	118	did not advance			
Shawn Dingilius-Wallace	50 m butterfly	30.39	87	did not advance			
Noel Keane	100 m freestyle	54.10	90	did not advance			
Noel Keane	200 m freestyle	2:02.63	63	did not advance			

Women

Athlete	Event	Heat		Semifinal		Final	
Athlete	Event	Time	Rank	Time	Rank	Time	Rank
Osisang Chilton	100 m freestyle	1:07.36	83	did not advance			
Osisang Chilton	100 m backstroke	1:16.55	60	did not advance			
Dirngulbai Misech	50 m freestyle	28.88	69	did not advance			
Dirngulbai Misech	50 m butterfly	31.14	53	did not advance			
