= Palau at the 2016 Summer Olympics =

- IOC code: PLW
- NOC: Palau National Olympic Committee
- Website: www.oceaniasport.com/palau

in Rio de Janeiro
- Competitors: 5 in 4 sports
- Flag bearer: Florian Skilang Temengil
- Medals: Gold 0 Silver 0 Bronze 0 Total 0

Summer Olympics appearances (overview)
- 2000; 2004; 2008; 2012; 2016; 2020; 2024

Palau competed at the 2016 Summer Olympics in Rio de Janeiro, Brazil, from 5 to 21 August 2016. This was the nation's fifth consecutive appearance at the Summer Olympics.

Five athletes, three men and two women, were selected to the Palauan team at the Games, competing only in athletics, swimming, freestyle wrestling, and flatwater canoeing (the country's Olympic debut in Rio de Janeiro). Two of Palau's Olympians returned: sprinter Rodman Teltull (men's 100 metres), and freestyle wrestler Florian Skilang Temengil (men's 125 kg), who reprised his role of leading the Palauan delegation as the nation's flag bearer for the second time in the opening ceremony, since he did so eight years earlier in Beijing. Palau, however, has yet to win its first ever Olympic medal.

== Athletics (track & field) ==
Palau has received one universality slot from IAAF to send one male athlete to the Olympics.

Key

- Note–Ranks given for track events are within the athlete's heat only
- Q = Qualified for the next round
- q = Qualified for the next round as a fastest loser or, in field events, by position without achieving the qualifying target
- NR = National record
- N/A = Round not applicable for the event
- Bye = Athlete not required to compete in round

Athlete	Event	Heat		Quarterfinal		Semifinal		Final	
Athlete	Event	Time	Rank	Time	Rank	Time	Rank	Time	Rank
Rodman Teltull	Men's 100 m	10.53	1 Q	10.64	8	did not advance			

== Canoeing ==
=== Sprint ===
Palau has received an invitation from the Tripartite Commission to send a boat in the women's K-1 500 m to the Olympics, signifying the nation's debut in the sport.

Athlete	Event	Heats		Semifinals		Final	
Athlete	Event	Time	Rank	Time	Rank	Time	Rank
Marina Toribiong	Women's K-1 200 m	48.913	6 Q	48.306	8	did not advance	
Marina Toribiong	Women's K-1 500 m	2:14.807	7	did not advance			

Qualification Legend: FA = Qualify to final (medal); FB = Qualify to final B (non-medal)

== Swimming ==
Palau has received a Universality invitation from FINA to send two swimmers (one male and one female) to the Olympics.

Athlete	Event	Heat		Semifinal		Final	
Athlete	Event	Time	Rank	Time	Rank	Time	Rank
Shawn Dingilius-Wallace	Men's 50 m freestyle	26.78	72	did not advance			
Dirngulbai Misech	Women's 50 m freestyle	29.19	65	did not advance			

== Wrestling ==
Palau has received an invitation from the Tripartite Commission to send a wrestler competing in the men's freestyle 125 kg to the Olympics, signifying the nation's comeback to the sport after an eight-year hiatus.

Key:

- VT – Victory by fall.
- PP – Decision by points – the loser with technical points.
- PO – Decision by points – the loser without technical points.

Men's freestyle

Athlete	Event	Qualification	Round of 16	Quarterfinal	Semifinal	Repechage 1	Repechage 2	Final / BM	
Athlete	Event	Opposition Result	Opposition Result	Opposition Result	Opposition Result	Opposition Result	Opposition Result	Opposition Result	Rank
Florian Skilang Temengil	−125 kg	Bye	Ligeti (HUN); L 0–4 ^{ST}	did not advance					19
