= Isebong Asang =

Belauan writer (c. 1951–2017)

- Born: c. 1951
- Died: August 2017
- Occupation: Writer

Isebong Maura Asang (c. 1951 – August 2017) was a Belauan writer and educator.

Isebong Asang was the daughter of Belauan parents. When she was six months old, her father, a naval engineer, brought the family to the village of Tamuning in Guam. She was raised in Sinajana, Guam.

She published the book Searching for a Palauan: Identity with an English Accent: Language with an Attitude (1999). Her work explores issues of identity and language in diasporic communities. She earned a PhD in education from the University of Hawaiʻi at Mānoa in 2004 with the dissertation Epistemological Implications: Blebaol, Klomengelungel, ma Tekoi er a Belau. She was a faculty member at Palau Community College.
