= Palau at the 2017 World Championships in Athletics =

- Flag of Palau
- WA code: PLW
- National federation: Palau Track and Field Association
- Website: Official website

in London, United Kingdom 4–13 August 2017
- Competitors: 1 (1 man) in 1 event
- Medals: Gold 0 Silver 0 Bronze 0 Total 0

World Championships in Athletics appearances
- 1997; 1999; 2001; 2003; 2005; 2007; 2009; 2011; 2013; 2015; 2017; 2019; 2022; 2023

Palau competed at the 2017 World Championships in Athletics in London, Great Britain, from 4–13 August 2017.

== Results ==
=== Men ===
Track and road events

Athlete	Event	Preliminary Round		Heat		Semifinal		Final	
Athlete	Event	Result	Rank	Result	Rank	Result	Rank	Result	Rank
Gwynn Uehara	100 metres	11.47 SB	24	Did not advance					
