= Palau at the 2000 Summer Olympics =

- IOC code: PLW
- NOC: Palau National Olympic Committee
- Website: www.oceaniasport.com/palau

in Sydney
- Competitors: 5 in 3 sports
- Flag bearer: Valerie Pedro
- Medals: Gold 0 Silver 0 Bronze 0 Total 0

Summer Olympics appearances (overview)
- 2000; 2004; 2008; 2012; 2016; 2020; 2024

Palau competed in the Olympic Games for the first time at the 2000 Summer Olympics in Sydney, Australia.

== Background ==
Palau is an island country located in the western region of the Caroline Islands, with a population of 21,431 as of July 2017. The nation gained independence in 1994 from the Trust Territory of the Pacific Islands, under the trusteeship of the United States. The two countries also entered the Compact of Free Association that year, allowing the United States to be responsible for Palau's national defense.

The Palau National Olympic Committee was formed in 1997, and it gained full International Olympic Committee (IOC) recognition in June 1999 at the 109th IOC session. Along with Eritrea, the 2000 Olympics were first for the countries. The 2000 Olympics were held from 15 September – 1 October 2000. Palau was part of the torch relay, as the torch stayed in the country on 23 May for one day before heading to the Federated States of Micronesia.

== Athletics (track and field) ==
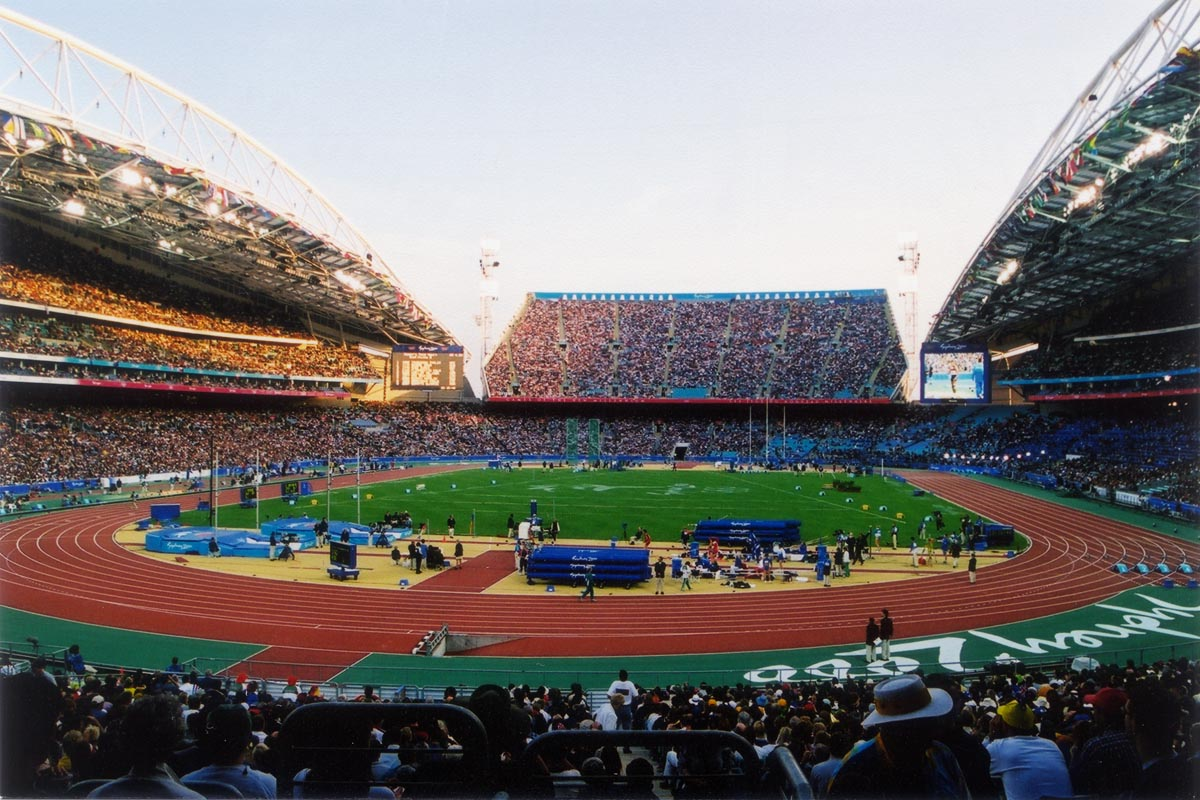
Adolf and Koshiba competed at Stadium Australia during the 2000 Summer Olympics

Palau was represented by athletes Christopher Adolf and Peoria Koshiba for athletics in the 2000 Olympic Games. Adolf competed in the men's 100 meters, and Koshiba competed in the women's 100 meters. Both have previously won their 100 meters in the 1998 Micronesian Games.

In the men's 100 meters, Adolf finished eighth out of nine in fourth heat of the first round, and he did not advance to the next round. Maurice Greene won the event, and Ato Boldon and Obadele Thompson won silver and bronze medals, respectively.

Koshiba competed in the women's 100 meters, where she finished seventh out of eight in the second heat of the first round, and she did not advance to the quarterfinals. Marion Jones, who was not competing for Palau, later went on to win the event, but she was stripped of her medal after she was found using performance-enhancing drugs.

Key

- Note–Ranks given for track events are within the athlete's heat only
- Q = Qualified for the next round
- q = Qualified for the next round as a fastest loser or, in field events, by position without achieving the qualifying target
- NR = National record
- N/A = Round not applicable for the event
- Bye = Athlete not required to compete in round

Men

Athlete	Event	Heat		Quarterfinal		Semifinal		Final	
Athlete	Event	Result	Rank	Result	Rank	Result	Rank	Result	Rank
Christopher Adolf	100 m	11.01	8	did not advance					

Women

Athlete	Event	Heat		Quarterfinal		Semifinal		Final	
Athlete	Event	Result	Rank	Result	Rank	Result	Rank	Result	Rank
Peoria Koshiba	100 m	12.66	7	did not advance					

== Swimming ==
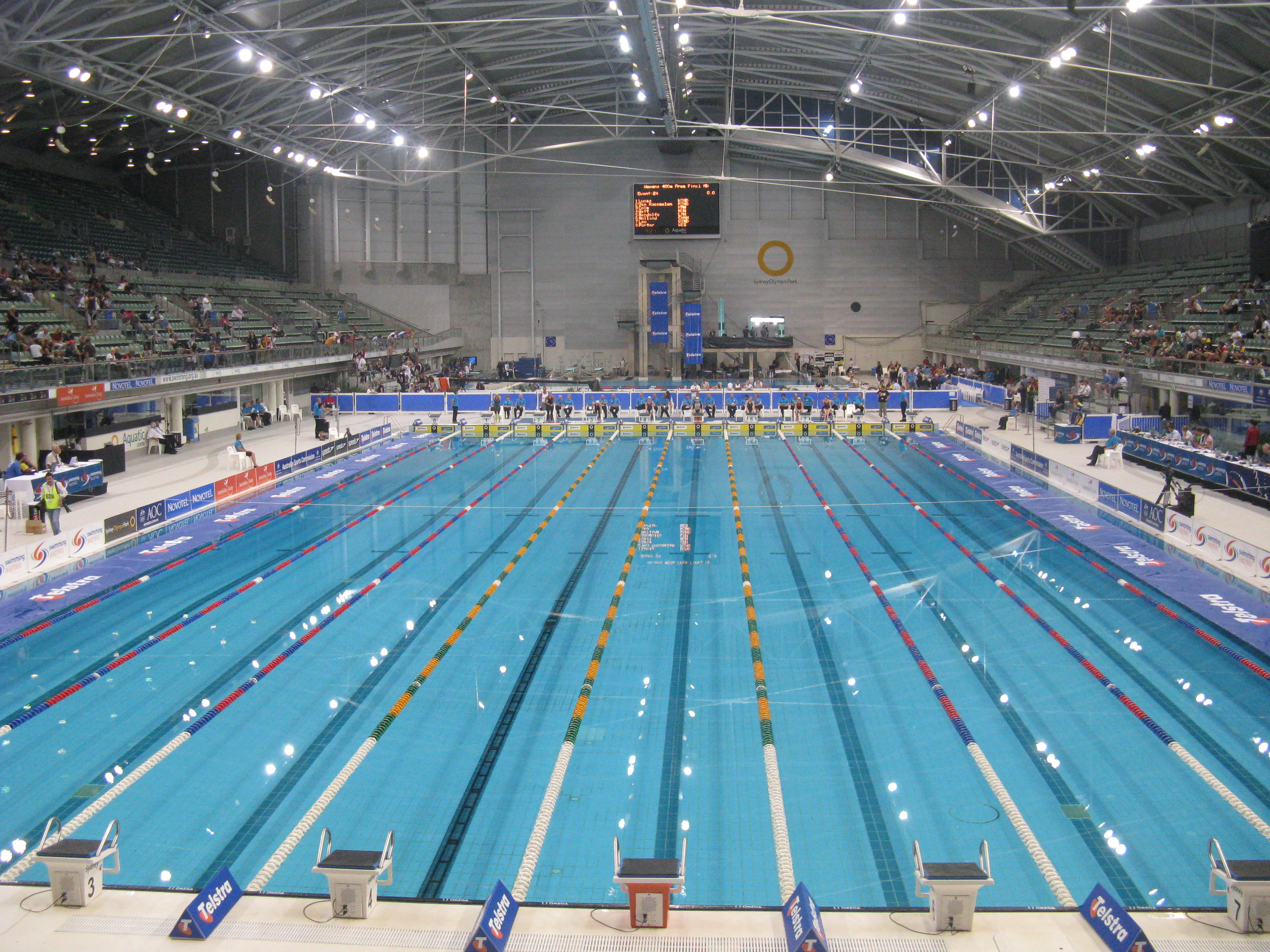
Sydney International Aquatic Centre, the host venue for the swimming events for the 2000 Summer Olympics

Men

Athlete	Event	Heat		Semifinal		Final	
Athlete	Event	Time	Rank	Time	Rank	Time	Rank
Anlloyd Samuel	50 m freestyle	27.24	71	did not advance			

Women

Athlete	Event	Heat		Semifinal		Final	
Athlete	Event	Time	Rank	Time	Rank	Time	Rank
Nicole Hayes	100 m freestyle	1:00.89	47	did not advance			

== Weightlifting ==
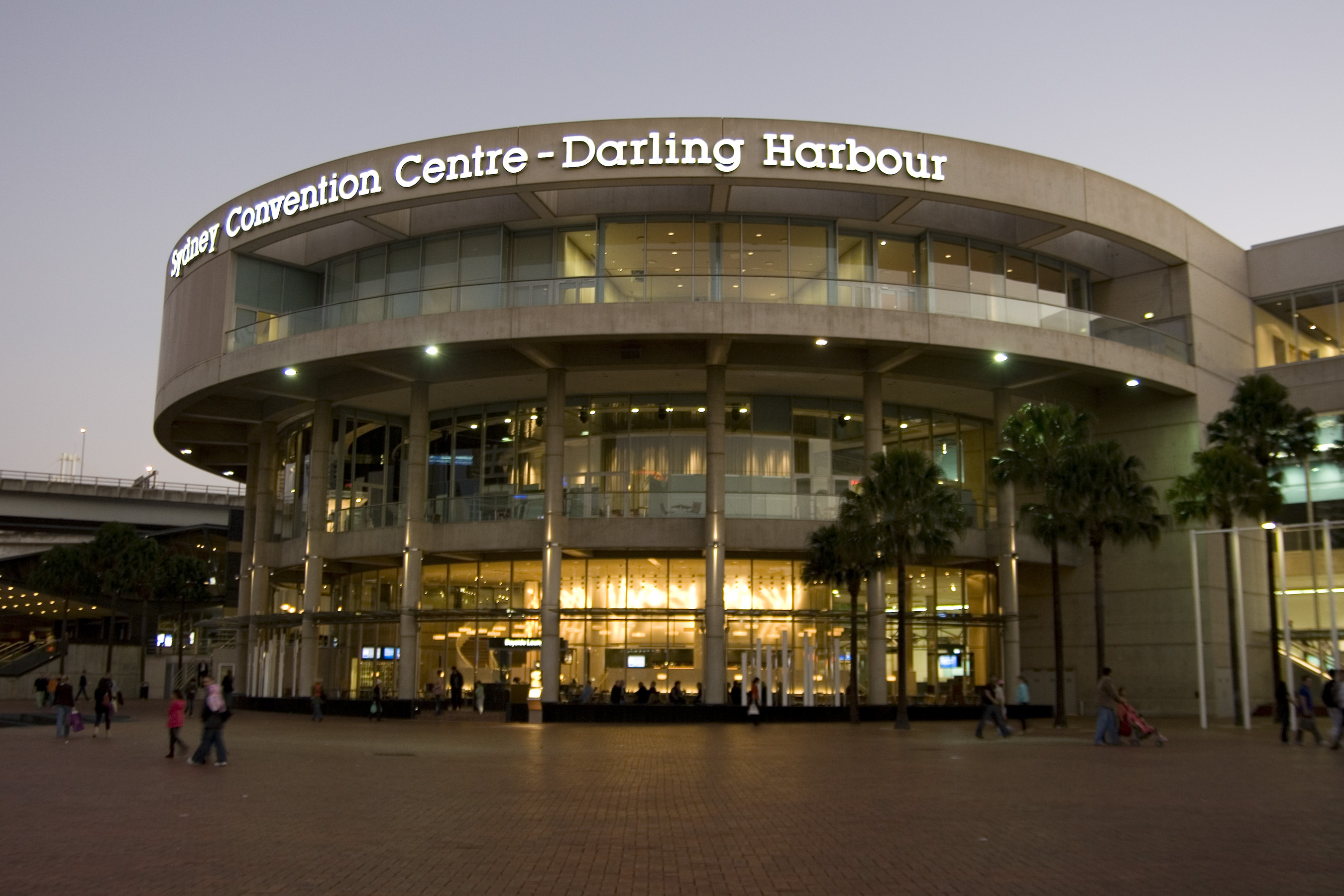
Sydney Convention and Exhibition Centre, which hosted the weightlifting events of the 2000 Summer Olympics

Women

Athlete	Event	Snatch			Clean & Jerk			Total	Rank
Athlete	Event	1	2	3	1	2	3	Total	Rank
Valerie Pedro	– 69 kg	70.0	~~75.0~~	~~75.0~~	~~87.5~~	87.5	90.0	160.0	14
