= Dadaş İbrahimov =

Azerbaijani sprinter

Personal information
- Nationality: Azerbaijani
- Born: 4 July 1976 (age 50)

Sport
- Sport: Sprinting
- Event: 200 metres

Dadaş İbrahimov (born 4 July 1976) is an Azerbaijani sprinter. He competed in the men's 200 metres at the 2004 Summer Olympics.
