= Palau at the 2004 Summer Olympics =

- IOC code: PLW
- NOC: Palau National Olympic Committee
- Website: www.oceaniasport.com/palau

in Athens
- Competitors: 4 in 3 sports
- Flag bearer: John Tarkong
- Medals: Gold 0 Silver 0 Bronze 0 Total 0

Summer Olympics appearances (overview)
- 2000; 2004; 2008; 2012; 2016; 2020; 2024

Palau was represented at the 2004 Summer Olympics in Athens, Greece by the Palau National Olympic Committee.

In total, four athletes including two men and two women represented Palau in three different sports including athletics, swimming and wrestling.

== Background ==
The Palau National Olympic Committee was formed in 1998 and was fully recognised by the International Olympic Committee (IOC) the following year. Palau made their Olympic debut at the 2000 Summer Olympics in Sydney, New South Wales, Australia. They sent five athletes including two men and three women. The 2004 Summer Olympics in Athens, Greece marked Palau's second appearance at the Summer Olympics.

== Competitors ==
In total, four athletes represented Palau at the 2004 Summer Olympics in Athens, Greece across three different sports.

Sport	Men	Women	Total
Athletics	1	1	2
Swimming	0	1	1
Wrestling	1	0	1
Total	2	2	4

== Athletics ==
In total, two Palauan athletes participated in the athletics events – Ngerak Florencio in the women's 100 m and Russel Roman in the men's 200 m.

Most of the athletics events, including those which Palauan athletes took part in, took place at the Athens Olympic Stadium in Marousi, Athens from 18 to 29 August 2004.

Men

Athlete	Event	Heat		Quarterfinal		Semifinal		Final	
Athlete	Event	Result	Rank	Result	Rank	Result	Rank	Result	Rank
Russel Roman	200 m	24.89	8	did not advance					

Women

Athlete	Event	Heat		Quarterfinal		Semifinal		Final	
Athlete	Event	Result	Rank	Result	Rank	Result	Rank	Result	Rank
Ngerak Florencio	100 m	12.76	7	did not advance					

== Swimming ==
In total, one Palauan athlete participated in the swimming events – Evelyn Otto in the women's 50 m freestyle.

The swimming events took place at the Athens Olympic Aquatic Centre in Marousi, Athens from 14 to 21 August 2004.

Athlete	Event	Heat		Semifinal		Final	
Athlete	Event	Time	Rank	Time	Rank	Time	Rank
Evelyn Otto	50 m freestyle	33.04	70	did not advance			

== Wrestling ==
In total, one Palauan athlete participated in the wrestling events – John Tarkong in the men's Greco-Roman −96 kg.

The wrestling events took place at the Ano Liosia Olympic Hall in Ano Liosia, Athens from 22 to 29 August 2004.

Athlete	Event	Elimination Pool			Quarterfinal	Semifinal	Final / BM	
Athlete	Event	Opposition Result	Opposition Result	Rank	Opposition Result	Opposition Result	Opposition Result	Rank
John Tarkong	−96 kg	Chkhaidze (KGZ); L 0–4 ^{ST}	Dinchev (BUL); L 0–4 ^{ST}	3	did not advance			20
