= Dorian Keletela =

Congolese sprinter (born 1999)

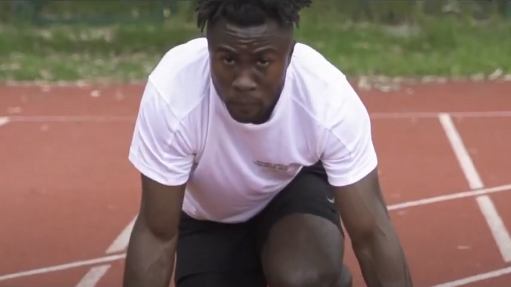
- Keletela in 2021

Personal information
- Born: Dorian Keletela; 6 February 1999 (age 27) Kinkala, Republic of the Congo

Sport
- Sport: Track and field
- Event: 100 metres

Dorian Keletela (born 6 February 1999) is a Congolese-born refugee sprinter who now lives in France. He competed on the Refugee Olympic Team at the 2020 Summer Olympics and the 2024 Summer Olympics.

== Early life ==
Keletela was born 6 February 1999 in the Republic of the Congo, in the midst of a civil war. When he was a teenager, his parents were killed due to political persecution, and he moved in with his aunt. They fled to Portugal in 2016, where they spent more than a year in refugee centers. He is now fluent in Portuguese. He moved to Paris in 2023.

== Career ==
Keletela began running at age 15, when he still lived in the Republic of the Congo. In 2019, he joined the World Athletics Refugee team, although he was injured and unable to compete that year. He received an International Olympic Committee Refugee Athlete Scholarship.

In March 2021, he was the first member of the World Athletics Refugee Team to compete at the European Indoor Championships in the 60m competition. He finished 8th in his heat with a time of 6.91 seconds.

Whilst competing as one of 29 athletes across 12 disciplines representing the Refugee Olympic team at the 2020 Tokyo Olympics, Keletela ran a personal best 10.33s in the 100 metres to win his preliminary heat. He then placed 8th in his next heat.

At the 2022 World Championships, he raced in the 100m event, where he placed second in the preliminary heat and 7th in his next heat.

Keletela was again a member of the Refugee Olympic Team at the 2024 Summer Olympics. He competed in the 100 metres, where he finished 8th in his preliminary heat. Afterward, he said he hoped he could compete in the 2028 Summer Olympics, and noted that he no longer held hope that he would compete for the Republic of the Congo due to violence continuing in the country.

== Competitions ==
Year	Competition	Venue	Position	Event	Notes
Representing the IOC Refugee Olympic Team and the World Athletics Athlete Refugee Team
2021	European Indoor Championships	Toruń, Poland	61st (h)	60 m	6.91
2021	Olympic Games	Tokyo, Japan	47th (h)	100 m	10.41
2022	World Championships	Eugene, United States	47th (h)	100 m	10.52
2024	Olympic Games	Paris, France	64th (h)	100 m	10.58
