= Palau at the 2024 Summer Olympics =

- IOC code: PLW
- NOC: Palau National Olympic Committee
- Website: www.oceaniasport.com/palau

in Paris, France 26 July 2024 – 11 August 2024
- Competitors: 3 (1 man and 2 women) in 2 sports
- Flag bearers (opening): Jion Hosei & Sydney Francisco
- Flag bearers (closing): Yuri Hosei & Jion Hosei
- Medals: Gold 0 Silver 0 Bronze 0 Total 0

Summer Olympics appearances (overview)
- 2000; 2004; 2008; 2012; 2016; 2020; 2024

Palau competed at the 2024 Summer Olympics in Paris, France, which were held from 26 July to 11 August 2024. It was the country's seventh appearance at the Summer Olympics since its debut in 2000. The country's athlete delegation contained three athletes: Sydney Francisco in athletics, and Jion Hosei and Yuri Hosei in swimming. Jion Hosei and Francisco were the flagbearers for the nation at the opening ceremony, Jion Hosei and Yuri Hosei were the flagbearers at the closing ceremony. The delegation was supported by a collaboration between the Australian Government and the Australian Olympic Committee, which was established for the development of sport in Pacific nations.

All of the athletes qualified after receiving universality slots in their events, which allows underrepresented nations to compete and for a National Olympic Committee (NOC) to send athletes despite not meeting the other qualification criteria. Jion Hosei competed in the men's 50 meter freestyle but swam in a time not fast enough to progress into further rounds. Francisco then competed in the women's 100 meters the following day and also did not progress further after not finishing with a fast enough time. Finally, Yuri competed in the women's 50 meter freestyle and also swam in a time not fast enough to progress into further rounds. Thus, Palau has yet to win an Olympic medal.

== Background ==
The Games were held from 26 July to 11 August 2024, in the city of Paris, France. This edition of the Games marked Palau's seventh appearance at the Summer Olympics since its debut at the 2000 Summer Olympics in Sydney, Australia. No athlete from Palau had ever won a medal at the Olympics, the best performance was the thirteenth place of weightlifter Stevick Patris in the men's 62 kg event at the 2012 Summer Olympics in Rio de Janeiro, Brazil.

In the lead-up to the Games, the Australian Government announced a collaboration with the Australian Olympic Committee to assist over 230 athletes from 13 Pacific nations (Note: Among the nations that were supported for the Games included the Cook Islands, the Federated States of Micronesia, Kiribati, the Marshall Islands, Palau, Papua New Guinea, Samoa, Tonga, Tuvalu, and Vanuatu.) for the 2024 Summer Olympics and 2024 Summer Paralympics, which included the Marshall Islands. The collaboration was made to create opportunities for said nations to compete in international competition, gain access to coaching, and develop sports diplomacy. On 26 February, Australian Ambassador to Palau Richelle Turner met with members of the Palauan national team to recognize Australia's support for the athletes of the nation. The delegation went to a training camp in Divonne-les-Bains with other Pacific athletes for their preparations for the Games.

=== Delegation ===
The final Palauan delegation was composed of fourteen people. The athletes and coaches traveled to Taipei on 13 July and arrived the following day for a connecting flight to Istanbul before landing in Geneva on 15 July. The management of the team left Palau on 18 July, athletes and coaches went to Paris on 22 July, while officials of the Palau National Olympic Committee (PNOC) arrived in Paris on 23 July. The officials present at the Games were chef de mission Marcy Andrew, PNOC president Frank Kyota, PNOC secretary general Baklai Temengil, PNOC staff Stephanie Ngirchoimei and Radley Kazuma, Oceania National Olympic Committees (ONOC) board members Hila Asanuma and Ernestine Rengiil, ONOC member Kenny Reklai, and World Aquatics board member Judy Otto. Coaches that were present were Uchel Tmetuchl for athletics and Jimmy Jonas for swimming. Three athletes ultimately qualified for the Games: sprinter Sydney Francisco, and swimmers Jion Hosei and Yuri Hosei. Outside of the qualified athletes, the nation also tried to qualify athletes in archery, canoeing, weightlifting, and wrestling. After all three athletes competed in their events, they received OLY post-nominal letters granted by the World Olympians Association in a ceremony hosted by Joël Bouzou.

=== Opening and closing ceremonies ===
The Palauan delegation came in 141st out of the 205 National Olympic Committees (NOCs) in the 2024 Summer Olympics Parade of Nations within the opening ceremony. Jion Hosei and Francisco held the flag for the delegation. At the closing ceremony, Yuri Hosei and Jion Hosei were the flag bearers.

== Competitors ==
List of Palauan competitors at the 2024 Summer Olympics
Sport	Men	Women	Total
Athletics	0	1	1
Swimming	1	1	2
Total	1	2	3

== Athletics ==
=== Qualification and lead-up to the Games ===
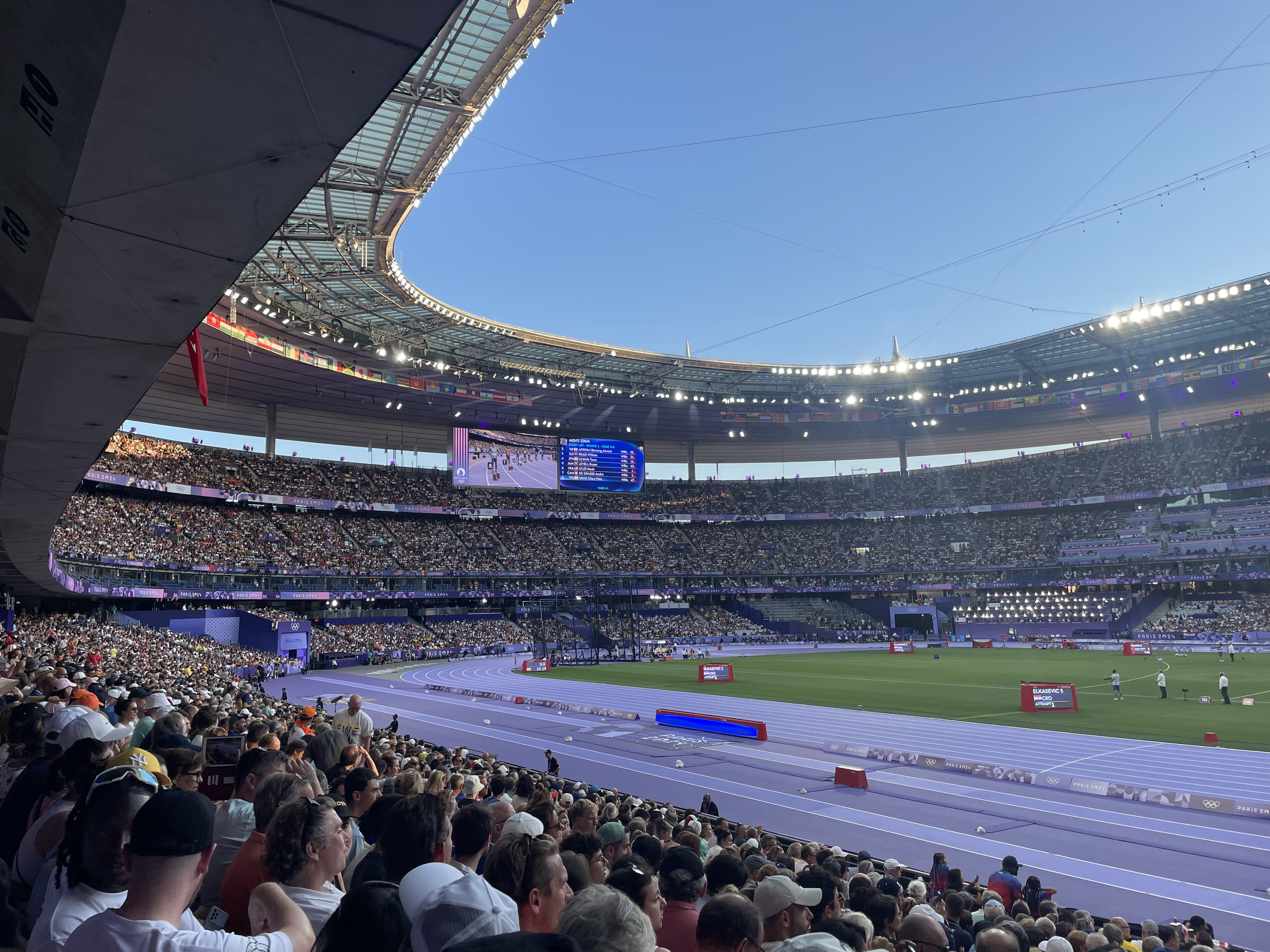
The Stade de France, where Francisco competed in her event

Palau was eligible for a universality slot to send an athletics competitor to the Games, which allows underrepresented nations to compete and for a National Olympic Committee (NOC) to send athletes despite not meeting the standard qualification criteria. The nation selected sprinter Sydney Francisco, who would compete in the women's 100 meters. She received her name, Sydney, as her mother, Peoria Koshiba, competed at the 2000 Summer Olympics held in Sydney, Australia. She was coached by her mother, and then Leanne Hines-Smith and trained with Steven Abraham at the Gold Coast, and then went to a training camp in Geneva a few weeks before the Games. She planned to set a personal best in the event and beat her mother's record.

=== Event ===
The athletics events were held at the Stade de France. Making her Olympic debut, Francisco competed in the preliminaries of the women's 100 meters on 2 August 2024 at 10:35 a.m., where she raced in the first heat against eight other competitors. She ran a time of 13.15 seconds and placed seventh in the heat, not progressing further. After she competed, she said that she felt disheartened due to her results but cheered up after having a conversation and trading pins with sprinter Sha'Carri Richardson of the United States whom she met prior and raced with at the 2023 World Athletics Championships in Budapest, Hungary.

Key

- Note–Ranks given for track events are within the athlete's heat only
- Q = Qualified for the next round
- q = Qualified for the next round as a fastest loser or, in field events, by position without achieving the qualifying target
- NR = National record
- N/A = Round not applicable for the event
- Bye = Athlete not required to compete in round

Track & road events

Athlete	Event	Preliminary		Heat		Semifinal		Final	
Athlete	Event	Result	Rank	Result	Rank	Result	Rank	Result	Rank
Sydney Francisco	Women's 100 m	13.15	7	Did not advance					

== Swimming ==
=== Qualification and lead-up to the Games ===
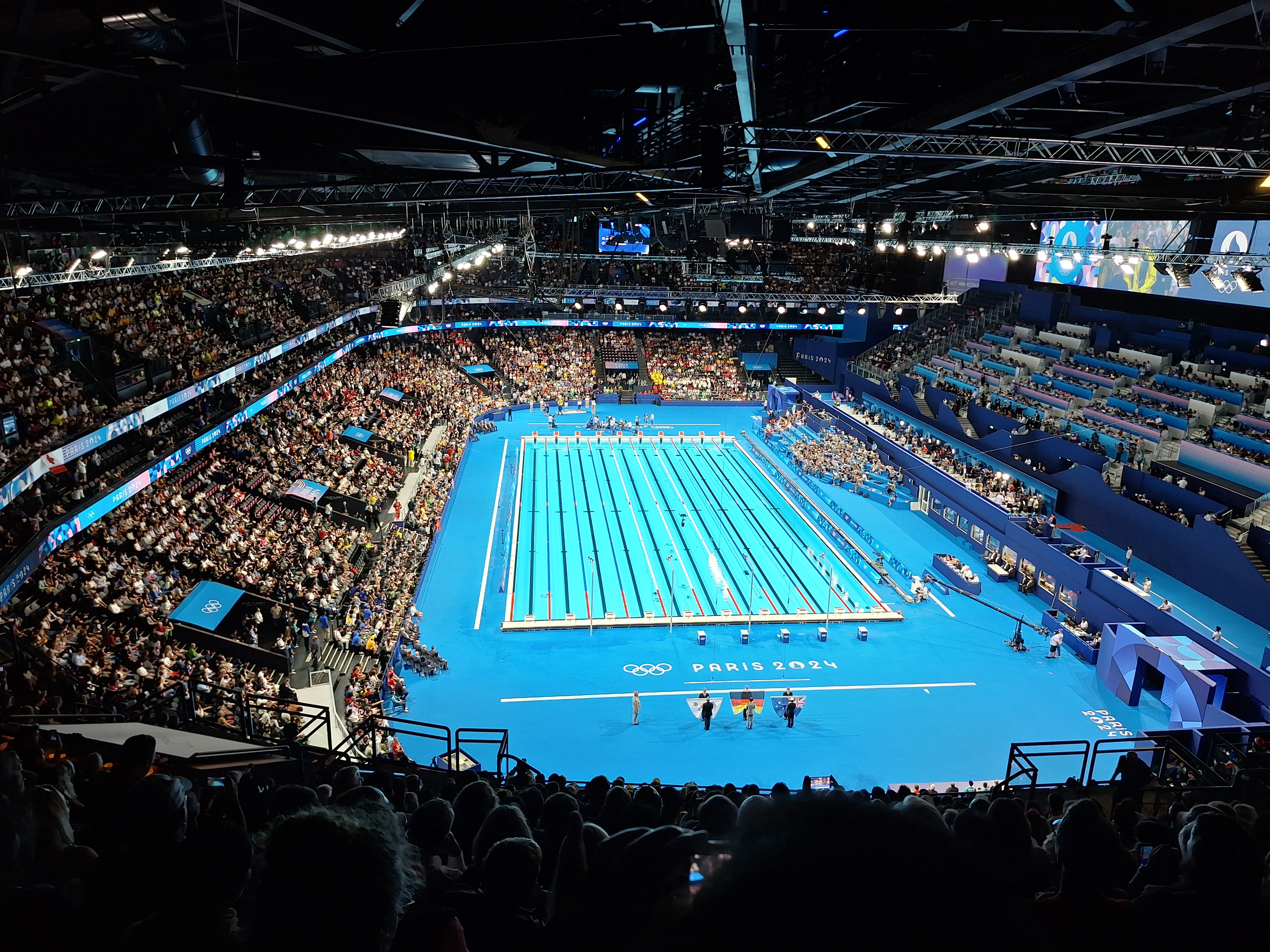
The Paris La Défense Arena, where the Hosei siblings competed in their events

Palau was eligible for universality slots to send swimmers to the Games. The nation selected siblings Jion Hosei and Yuri Hosei, who were the first siblings to compete for the nation at a Games and would compete in the men's 50 meter freestyle and women's 50 meter freestyle respectively. Prior to the Games, Jion Hosei had to train before and after his high school classes while Yuri Hosei trained abroad at her university, Sophia University. Yuri Hosei found out about their qualification for the Games after their mother called her while she was studying at a restaurant. She and her brother trained in Geneva a few weeks before the Games.

=== Event ===
Making his Olympic debut, Jion Hosei first competed in his event on 1 August 2024 at 11:26 a.m., which was held in the Paris La Défense Arena. He competed in the fourth of the heats and swam in a new personal best time of 25.67 seconds. He placed sixth out of the eight swimmers in his heat, though he finished with a time not fast enough to progress to later rounds, and placed 53rd overall. The eventual winner of the event was Cameron McEvoy of Australia with a time of 21.25 seconds. After he competed in his event, he expressed his gratitude to compete at the Games with his sister.

Yuri Hosei competed in her event on 3 August 2024 at 11:05 a.m., making her Olympic debut. She competed in the third of the heats and swam a personal best time of 30.52 seconds. She placed equal sixth out of the eight swimmers in her heat, finished with a time not enough to progress to later rounds, and placed 64th overall. The eventual winner of the event was Sarah Sjöström of Sweden with a time of 23.71 seconds. After she competed, she praised her mother for encouraging the siblings to train hard. She also stated that she felt encouraged to compete due to other Oceanian athletes competing at the Games and Sophia University's swim team, her swim team at the university she studies at.

Athlete	Event	Heat		Semifinal		Final	
Athlete	Event	Time	Rank	Time	Rank	Time	Rank
Jion Hosei	Men's 50 m freestyle	25.67 PB	53 (Note: Qualifiers for the latter rounds (Q) of all events were decided on a time only basis, therefore positions shown are overall results versus competitors in all heats.)	Did not advance			
Yuri Hosei	Women's 50 m freestyle	30.52 PB	64	Did not advance			
