= Enoch Adegoke =

Nigerian sprinter (born 2000)

Enoch Obaoluwa Adegoke
Personal information
- Born: 8 March 2000 (age 26) Igbeti, Nigeria
- Education: Obafemi Awolowo University, Ile-Ife, Osun State, Nigeria
- Height: 5 ft 7 in (170 cm)
- Weight: 71 kg (157 lb)

Sport
- Country: Nigeria
- Sport: Track and field
- Event: 100 metres
- Coached by: Ayokunle Odelusi

Achievements and titles
- Personal bests: 100m 9.98 (+0.3 m/s) (Tokyo 2021); 200 m 21.07 (-0.1 m/s) (Abidjan 2019)
Medal record
Men's athletics
Representing Nigeria
African Championships
Silver medal – second place	2018 Asaba	4×100 m

Enoch Obaloluwa Adegoke (born 8 March 2000) is a Nigerian sprinter. He was the 2019 African U20 champion in the 100 metres. He is also an Olympic Games and Commonwealth Games finalist in the 100 metres.

At the 2018 Commonwealth Games, he competed in both the 100 metres and the 4×100 metres relay. In the 100 metres, Adegoke won both his heat and semi-final to progress to the final where he finished seventh in a time of 10.35s.

== Career ==
=== 2018 Commonwealth Games and African Championships ===
Early in 2018, Adegoke won the 100m at the Nigerian Commonwealth Games trials in a personal best time of 10.31s. The trials which were held in Abuja saw the seventeen-year-old Adegoke go into the final as the fifth fastest athlete behind favourites Seye Ogunlewe and Ogho-Oghene Egwero. Ogunlewe did not start in the final, and Adegoke took the opportunity to secure a spot on the Nigerian team to the games by winning the race while Egwero placed second.

In his first race outside Nigeria, Adegoke set a personal best of 10.19s in the 100m heats at the Commonwealth Games. He backed up that performance when he returned to win his semi-final race ahead of Henricho Bruintjies, who finished in second place. Though he finished in 7th place in the final, he had achieved some history by being the first home-based athlete in a Commonwealth, World or Olympic final in over a decade. In the 4×100 metres relay he was part of a Nigerian team that qualified for the final. The team, however, failed to finish and was eventually disqualified in the final.

Adegoke was named as one of the athletes representing his country at the 2018 World U20 Athletics Championships. The Nigerian athletes, however, never left the country as their visas were not ready by the time the event started.

He represented Nigeria at the 2018 African Championships in the 100m and 4 × 100 m relay. Though he did not run in the final of the 4 × 100 m relay, he helped the team qualify for a place in the final. The Nigerian team went on to win a silver medal in the event.

=== 2019 U20 Championships and Relays ===
Adegoke went into the 2019 African U20 Championships in Abidjan as one of the favourites for the 100m title. He won his heat, semifinal races, and the title in a season's best time of 10.29s. In the 200m, he finished off the podium in fourth place. He later anchored the Nigerian team made up of Gershon Omubo, Shedrack Akpeki, Alaba Akintola and himself to a win in the 4×100 metres relay at the championships.

He represented Nigeria in the relays at the 2019 World Relays and also at the Doha World Championships.

=== 2020 Tokyo Olympics and National Titles ===
He qualified for the Tokyo 2020 Olympics, winning the 100m at the Nigerian Championships in 10.00s. The clock showed 9.97 as he crossed the finish line and he thought he had dipped under 10s for the first time but the official time was round up. Nonetheless, excited journalists quickly reported that he had dipped under 10s before the time was confirmed. This was the only time he had dipped beneath the 2020 Olympic standard after being close on previous attempts clocking 10.06s and a windy 10.05s.

He is the current fastest man in Nigeria after beating the likes of Usheoritse Itsekiri and Jerry Jakpa to claim the feat.

He won the 100 meters final at the Nigeria National Sports Festival (EDO 2020) with a time of 10.28s ahead of teammate Alaba Akintola who placed second with 10.29s.

At the 2020 Summer Olympics in Tokyo, Adegoke ran a personal best of 9.98 in his 100m event heat, becoming the eleventh Nigerian sprinter to break the 10-second barrier. He then finished second in his semi-final heat with a time of 10.00s to advance to the final, but in the final Adegoke pulled up with an apparent hamstring injury and was unable to finish the race.
