= Palau at the 2012 Summer Olympics =

- IOC code: PLW
- NOC: Palau National Olympic Committee
- Website: www.oceaniasport.com/palau

in London
- Competitors: 5 in 4 sports
- Flag bearer: Rodman Teltull
- Medals: Gold 0 Silver 0 Bronze 0 Total 0

Summer Olympics appearances (overview)
- 2000; 2004; 2008; 2012; 2016; 2020; 2024

The Oceanic island nation of Palau competed at the 2012 Summer Olympics in London from 27 July to 12 August 2012. This was the nation's fourth consecutive appearance at the Olympics.

Five Palauan athletes were selected to the team, competing only in athletics, judo, swimming, and weightlifting; all of them had participated in their first Olympics. Sprinter Rodman Teltull, the youngest male athlete of the team, was the nation's flag bearer at the opening ceremony. Palau, however, has yet to win its first Olympic medal.

== Athletics ==
Key

- Note–Ranks given for track events are within the athlete's heat only
- Q = Qualified for the next round
- q = Qualified for the next round as a fastest loser or, in field events, by position without achieving the qualifying target
- NR = National record
- N/A = Round not applicable for the event
- Bye = Athlete not required to compete in round

Men

Athlete	Event	Heat		Quarterfinal		Semifinal		Final	
Athlete	Event	Result	Rank	Result	Rank	Result	Rank	Result	Rank
Rodman Teltull	100 m	11.06	5	did not advance					

Women

Athlete	Event	Heat		Quarterfinal		Semifinal		Final	
Athlete	Event	Result	Rank	Result	Rank	Result	Rank	Result	Rank
Ruby Joy Gabriel	100 m	13.34	7	did not advance					

== Judo ==
Palau has qualified one judoka. Jennifer Anson earned a quota place in the women's −63 kg through her position at the Oceania Judo Championships.

Athlete	Event	Round of 32	Round of 16	Quarterfinals	Semifinals	Repechage	Final / BM	
Athlete	Event	Opposition Result	Opposition Result	Opposition Result	Opposition Result	Opposition Result	Opposition Result	Rank
Jennifer Anson	Women's −63 kg	Tsedevsuren (MGL); L 0000–1100	did not advance					

== Swimming ==
Palau has gained a "Universality place" from the FINA.

Women

Athlete	Event	Heat		Semifinal		Final	
Athlete	Event	Time	Rank	Time	Rank	Time	Rank
Keesha Keane	50 m freestyle	28.25	50	did not advance			

== Weightlifting ==
Athlete	Event	Snatch		Clean & Jerk		Total	Rank
Athlete	Event	Result	Rank	Result	Rank	Total	Rank
Stevick Patris	Men's −62 kg	104	15	130	13	234	14
