= Palau at the 2008 Summer Olympics =

- IOC code: PLW
- NOC: Palau National Olympic Committee
- Website: www.oceaniasport.com/palau

in Beijing
- Competitors: 5 in 3 sports
- Flag bearers: Elgin Loren Elwais (opening); Amber Yobech (closing)
- Officials: 7
- Medals: Gold 0 Silver 0 Bronze 0 Total 0

Summer Olympics appearances (overview)
- 2000; 2004; 2008; 2012; 2016; 2020; 2024

Palau competed at the 2008 Summer Olympics in Beijing, China. Palau's Olympic delegation was led by Frank Kyota, the president of the Palau National Olympic Committee, and consisted of five athletes, three team officials and four coaches. This was an increase from the nation's two previous appearances at the Summer Olympic Games; four athletes had been sent to both the Sydney and Athens Games. Palau's Olympic team was one of the 117 that won no medals at the Games.

== Opening and closing ceremonies ==
Palau was the 119th national team to enter the Beijing National Stadium in the parade of nations during the Opening Ceremony. The country's flag bearer was freestyle wrestler Elgin Loren Elwais, the first Palauan athlete to have qualified for a Games based on his own performances.

At the Closing Ceremony athletes entered in a less formal style, led by the flag bearers of all the competing nations. The Palauan flag was carried by swimmer Amber Yobech.

== Athletics ==
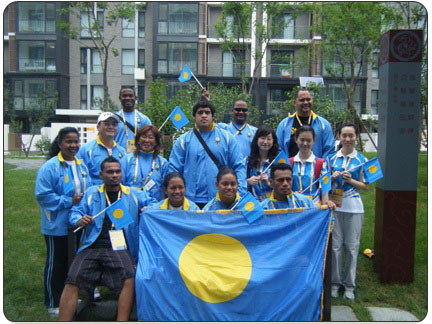
The 2008 Palau Olympic Team

Palau had two competitors in the sport of athletics, one in each of the men's and women's 100 m sprints. Jesse Tamangrow finished seventh out of eight competitors in a heat which included eventual bronze medallist Walter Dix. Despite setting a new personal best time of 11.38 seconds he did not advance to the quarterfinals of the competition. In the women's event Peoria Koshiba finished eighth out of nine athletes in the first heat and did not advance to the next round.

Key

- Note–Ranks given for track events are within the athlete's heat only
- Q = Qualified for the next round
- q = Qualified for the next round as a fastest loser or, in field events, by position without achieving the qualifying target
- NR = National record
- N/A = Round not applicable for the event
- Bye = Athlete not required to compete in round

Men

Athlete	Event	Heat		Quarterfinal		Semifinal		Final	
Athlete	Event	Result	Rank	Result	Rank	Result	Rank	Result	Rank
Jesse Tamangrow	100 m	11.38 PB	7	Did not advance					

Women

Athlete	Event	Heat		Quarterfinal		Semifinal		Final	
Athlete	Event	Result	Rank	Result	Rank	Result	Rank	Result	Rank
Peoria Koshiba	100 m	13.18	8	Did not advance					

== Swimming ==
Amber Yobech, the youngest member of the team at age 17, was the sole Palauan representative in the swimming events. She finished 3rd in her heat and 71st out of the 92 competitors overall.

Women

Athlete	Event	Heat		Semifinal		Final	
Athlete	Event	Time	Rank	Time	Rank	Time	Rank
Amber Yobech	50 m freestyle	30.00	71	Did not advance			

Qualifiers for the latter rounds of all swimming events at the Games were decided on a time only basis between competitors from all heats, therefore the rank shown is an overall position against every swimmer in the round.

== Wrestling ==
Two wrestlers represented Palau in Beijing. Both athletes received byes in the first round but were defeated in their respective round of 16 matches. Elgin Loren Elwais, the reigning Oceanic champion, was beaten on points by three times world champion Hamid Soryan in the Greco-Roman 55 kg. After the bout he announced his hope of competing at the 2012 Olympics in London, saying, "It is my first Olympics and I am looking forward to my next because I'm young." The other wrestler Florian Skilang Temengil was beaten by Hungarian Ottó Aubéli in the Freestyle 120 kg.

Key:

- VT - Victory by Fall.
- PP - Decision by Points - the loser with technical points.
- PO - Decision by Points - the loser without technical points.

Men's freestyle

Athlete	Event	Qualification	Round of 16	Quarterfinal	Semifinal	Repechage 1	Repechage 2	Final / BM	
Athlete	Event	Opposition Result	Opposition Result	Opposition Result	Opposition Result	Opposition Result	Opposition Result	Opposition Result	Rank
Florian Skilang Temengil	−120 kg	Bye	Aubéli (HUN); L 1–3 ^{PP}	Did not advance					16

Men's Greco-Roman

Athlete	Event	Qualification	Round of 16	Quarterfinal	Semifinal	Repechage 1	Repechage 2	Final / BM	
Athlete	Event	Opposition Result	Opposition Result	Opposition Result	Opposition Result	Opposition Result	Opposition Result	Opposition Result	Rank
Elgin Loren Elwais	−55 kg	Bye	Sourian (IRI); L 0–3 ^{PO}	Did not advance					19

== Media coverage ==
The 2008 Summer Olympics marked the first time that Palauans were able to watch complete Olympic television coverage of all events in their own country. Palau's in-depth television coverage was due to a special agreement between TV New Zealand and the Palau National Communications Corporation.
