= Russel Roman =

Palauan sprinter

Russel Ward Roman (born 26 March 1975 in Koror, Palau) is a track and field sprint athlete who competed internationally for Palau.

== Biography ==
Roman represented Palau at the 2004 Summer Olympics in Athens. He competed in the 200 metres and finished 8th in his heat so didn't advance to the next round. He also competed at the 2004 IAAF World Indoor Championships in Budapest.
