= Evelyn Otto =

Palauan swimmer

Personal information
- Full name: Evelyn Ikelau Otto
- National team: Palau
- Born: 24 March 1989 (age 37) Suva, Fiji
- Height: 1.63 m (5 ft 4 in)
- Weight: 65 kg (143 lb)

Sport
- Sport: Swimming
- Strokes: Freestyle

Evelyn Ikelau Otto (born March 24, 1989) is a Palauan former swimmer. She swam for Palau at the 2004 Summer Olympics and at the 2003 World Championships.

Otto competed in the women's 50 m freestyle at the 2004 Summer Olympics in Athens, by receiving a Universality place from FINA. Swimming in heat two, she posted a lifetime best of 33.04 to finish fifth and seventieth overall in the prelims.
