= Athletics at the 2020 Summer Olympics – Men's 100 metres =

Men's 100 metres at the Games of the XXXII Olympiad
- Venue: Olympic Stadium
- Dates: 31 July 2021 (preliminary round & heats); 1 August 2021 (semi-finals & final)
- Competitors: 78 from 59 nations
- Winning time: 9.80

Medalists
1st place, gold medalist(s)		Marcell Jacobs	Italy
2nd place, silver medalist(s)		Fred Kerley	United States
3rd place, bronze medalist(s)		Andre De Grasse	Canada

Official Video Highlights

The men's 100 metres event at the 2020 Summer Olympics took place on 31 July and 1 August 2021 at the Olympic Stadium. 84 athletes were expected to compete; 27 nations used universality places to enter athletes in addition to the 56 qualifying through standard time or ranking (23 universality places were used in 2016). 78 athletes from 59 nations competed. Marcell Jacobs won the gold medal, establishing twice, semifinal and final, the new European record, Italy's first medal in the men's 100 metres. The United States extended its podium streak in the event to six Games with Fred Kerley's silver, only third at the U.S. Trials. Canadian Andre De Grasse won his second consecutive bronze medal in the 100 metres establishing his personal best. With Usain Bolt retired, Jamaica's three-Games gold medal streak ended.

After the Games, it was reported that Giacomo Spazzini, who had worked as Jacobs' nutritionist, was involved in a steroid investigation in Italy. In response, Jacobs' agent stated that the athlete had cut ties with Spazzini several months before the Olympics.

== Summary ==
Former 400 metres specialist (ranked #8 of all time) USA's Fred Kerley won the first semi-final, with defending bronze medalist Andre De Grasse from Canada qualifying as second. In the second semi-final American world leader and gold medal favourite Trayvon Bromell was pipped in a photofinish by Enoch Adegoke of Nigeria, who came in second behind Zharnel Hughes of Great Britain, the current European Champion.

In the third semi-final China's Su Bingtian got a blistering start and held off the group to improve his own Asian record by 0.08 to 9.83, concurrently setting the unofficial 60 metres world best. Two thousandths behind, Ronnie Baker from USA also improved his personal best, both men timed at 9.83 and tied for #12 on the all time list. Italy's Marcell Jacobs, who had arrived at the event as the 60 metres world leader, came in a close third and was timed at 9.84, setting the European record, improving his PB by 0.1 and equalling 1996 champion Donovan Bailey for #14. Jacobs qualified for the final on time along with the second pre-Olympics favorite, African record holder Akani Simbine of South Africa who qualified with 9.90. Bromell, having run a time of 10.00, was eliminated in what was considered a significant upset.

The center lanes of the final included the three heat winners Su, Kerley and Hughes and fastest second Baker.

Hughes bolted early for a clear false start, with all runners except Jacobs sprinting from the blocks after him, and was disqualified. The second start was clean: Su could not repeat his great semi-final start, with Kerley having the fastest reaction time and leading the race until about the 70 m mark, where he was passed by a resurgent Jacobs. From there, Jacobs opened up space on the group, with Kerley staying the closest as Adegoke pulled up lame, while De Grasse, after running last, accelerated and passed Baker and Simbine at the 90 metres mark to take his second bronze medal in the event. Jacobs had the clear win over Kerley and was immediately cheered by Gianmarco Tamberi, who had just won the high jump event just 13 minutes earlier. The two hugged and celebrated an iconic moment in Italian Olympic history.

Jacobs was timed at 9.80 for an unexpected Olympic victory. This marked his second improvement of the European record in just a few hours, tying Steve Mullings for #10 of all time. Kerley and De Grasse both improved their wind-legal personal best results to 9.84 and 9.89 respectively.

== Background ==
This was the twenty-ninth time the event was held, having appeared at every Olympics since the first in 1896.

The Democratic Republic of the Congo, Nauru, the Refugee Olympic Team, Slovakia, and Tajikistan each made their men's 100 metres debut. The United States made its 28th appearance in the event, the most of any country, having missed only the boycotted 1980 Games.

== Qualification ==
A National Olympic Committee (NOC) could enter up to 3 qualified athletes in the men's 100 metres event if all athletes meet the entry standard or qualify by ranking during the qualifying period (the limit of 3 has been in place since the 1930 Olympic Congress). The qualifying standard is 10.05 seconds. This standard was "set for the sole purpose of qualifying athletes with exceptional performances unable to qualify through the IAAF World Rankings pathway." The world rankings, based on the average of the best five results for the athlete over the qualifying period and weighted by the importance of the meet, will then be used to qualify athletes until the cap of 56 is reached.

The qualifying period was originally from 1 May 2019 to 29 June 2020. Due to the COVID-19 pandemic, the period was suspended from 6 April 2020 to 30 November 2020, with the end date extended to 29 June 2021. The world rankings period start date was also changed from 1 May 2019 to 30 June 2020; athletes who had met the qualifying standard during that time were still qualified, but those using world rankings would not be able to count performances during that time. The qualifying time standards could be obtained in various meets during the given period that have the approval of the IAAF. Only outdoor meets were eligible for the sprints and short hurdles, including the 100 metres. The most recent Area Championships may be counted in the ranking, even if not during the qualifying period. Races with wind above 2.0 m/s were not included.

NOCs can also use their universality place—each NOC can enter one male athlete regardless of time if they had no male athletes meeting the entry standard for an athletics event—in the 100 metres.

Entry number: 56 (17 from Ranking) + 27 Universality and 1 Invitational. Some sprinters, like Aaron Brown, have been withdrawn (see note #11).

Qualification standard	No. of athletes	NOC	Nominated athletes
Entry standard – 10.05	3	Great Britain	Zharnel Hughes; Reece Prescod; Chijindu Ujah
Entry standard – 10.05	3	Jamaica	Yohan Blake; Oblique Seville; Tyquendo Tracey
Entry standard – 10.05	3	Japan	Yuki Koike; Shuhei Tada; Ryota Yamagata
Entry standard – 10.05	3	Nigeria	Enoch Adegoke; Usheoritse Itsekiri; Divine Oduduru
Entry standard – 10.05	3	South Africa	Gift Leotlela; Shaun Maswanganyi; Akani Simbine
Entry standard – 10.05	3	United States	Ronnie Baker; Trayvon Bromell; Fred Kerley
Entry standard – 10.05	1	Canada	Andre De Grasse; ~~Aaron Brown~~
Entry standard – 10.05	2	China	Su Bingtian; Xie Zhenye
Entry standard – 10.05	2	Ghana	Joseph Amoah; Benjamin Azamati-Kwaku
Entry standard – 10.05	1	Kenya	~~Mark Odhiambo~~; Ferdinand Omurwa
Entry standard – 10.05	1	Antigua and Barbuda	Cejhae Greene
Entry standard – 10.05	1	Australia	Rohan Browning
Entry standard – 10.05	1	Bahamas	Samson Colebrooke
Entry standard – 10.05	1	Barbados	Mario Burke
Entry standard – 10.05	1	Brazil	Paulo André de Oliveira
Entry standard – 10.05	1	Cayman Islands	Kemar Hyman
Entry standard – 10.05	1	France	Jimmy Vicaut
Entry standard – 10.05	1	Indonesia	Lalu Muhammad Zohri
Entry standard – 10.05	1	Iran	Hassan Taftian
Entry standard – 10.05	1	Italy	Marcell Jacobs
Entry standard – 10.05	1	Ivory Coast	Arthur Cissé
Entry standard – 10.05	1	Liberia	Emmanuel Matadi
Entry standard – 10.05	1	Qatar	Femi Ogunode
Entry standard – 10.05	1	Saint Kitts and Nevis	Jason Rogers
World ranking
World ranking	2	Brazil	Felipe Bardi dos Santos; Rodrigo do Nascimento
World ranking	2	Canada	Bismark Boateng; Gavin Smellie
World ranking	2	Switzerland	Silvan Wicki; Alex Wilson
World ranking	2	Turkey	Emre Zafer Barnes; Jak Ali Harvey
World ranking	1	China	Wu Zhiqiang
World ranking	1	Chinese Taipei	Yang Chun-han
World ranking	1	Denmark	Kojo Musah
World ranking	0	France	~~Mouhamadou Fall~~
World ranking	1	Italy	Filippo Tortu
World ranking	1	Panama	~~Alonso Edward~~
World ranking	1	Portugal	Carlos Nascimento
World ranking	1	Slovakia	Ján Volko
World ranking	1	Sri Lanka	Yupun Abeykoon
Universality Places	1	Afghanistan	Sha Mahmood Noor Zahi
Universality Places	1	Angola	Aveni Miguel
Universality Places	1	American Samoa	Nathan Crumpton
Universality Places	1	Belize	Shaun Gill
Universality Places	1	Benin	Didier Kiki
Universality Places	1	Bolivia	Bruno Rojas
Universality Places	1	Cambodia	Pen Sokong
Universality Places	1	Democratic Republic of the Congo	Oliver Mwimba
Universality Places	1	Federated States of Micronesia	Scott Fiti
Universality Places	1	Fiji	Banuve Tabakaucoro
Universality Places	1	Gabon	Guy Maganga Gorra
Universality Places	1	The Gambia	Ebrima Camara
Universality Places	1	Guinea-Bissau	Seco Camara
Universality Places	1	Guyana	Emanuel Archibald
Universality Places	1	Kiribati	Lataisi Mwea
Universality Places	1	Maldives	Hassan Saaid
Universality Places	1	Nauru	Jonah Harris
Universality Places	1	Nicaragua	Yeykell Romero
Universality Places	1	Niger	Badamassi Saguirou
Universality Places	1	Oman	Barakat Al-Harthi
Universality Places	1	Palau	Adrian Ililau
Universality Places	1	Tajikistan	Ildar Akhmadiev
Universality Places	1	Togo	Fabrice Dabla
Universality Places	1	Tonga	Ronald Fotofili
Universality Places	1	Tuvalu	Karalo Maibuca
Universality Places	1	United Arab Emirates	Mohamed Alhammadi
Universality Places	1	Zimbabwe	Ngoni Makusha
Invitational Places	1	Refugee Olympic Team	Dorian Keletela
Total	83		

== Competition format ==
The event continued to use the preliminaries plus three main rounds format introduced in 2012. Athletes not meeting the qualification standard (that is, were entered through universality places) competed in the preliminaries; those who met the standard started in the first round.

== Records ==
Prior to this competition, the existing global and area records were as follows:

Global records before the 2020 Summer Olympics
Record	Athlete (Nation)	Time (s)	Location	Date
World record	Usain Bolt (JAM)	9.58	Berlin, Germany	16 August 2009
Olympic record	Usain Bolt (JAM)	9.63	London, United Kingdom	5 August 2012
World leading	Trayvon Bromell (USA)	9.77	Miramar, Florida, United States	5 June 2021

Area records before the 2020 Summer Olympics
Area
Area	Time (s)	Wind	Athlete	Nation
Africa (records)	9.84	+1.2	Akani Simbine	South Africa
Asia (records)	9.91	+1.8	Femi Ogunode	Qatar
Asia (records)	9.91	+0.6	Femi Ogunode	Qatar
Asia (records)	9.91	+0.2	Su Bingtian	China
Asia (records)	9.91	+0.8	Su Bingtian	China
Europe (records)	9.86	+0.6	Francis Obikwelu	Portugal
Europe (records)	9.86	+1.3	Jimmy Vicaut	France
Europe (records)	9.86	+1.8	Jimmy Vicaut	France
North, Central America and Caribbean (records)	9.58 WR	+0.9	Usain Bolt	Jamaica
Oceania (records)	9.93	+1.8	Patrick Johnson	Australia
South America (records)	10.00^{[A]}	+1.6	Robson da Silva	Brazil

The following national records were established during the competition:

Country	Athlete	Round	Time	Notes
Tuvalu	Karalo Maibuca	Preliminaries	11.42	
Italy	Marcell Jacobs	Round 1	9.94	NR
Italy	Marcell Jacobs	Semifinals	9.84	ER, NR
Italy	Marcell Jacobs	Final	9.80	ER, NR
Kenya	Ferdinand Omurwa	Round 1	10.01	
Kenya	Ferdinand Omurwa	Semifinals	10.00	
China	Su Bingtian	Semifinals	9.83	AR

== Schedule ==
All times are Japan Standard Time (UTC+09:00)

The men's 100 metres took place over two consecutive days.

Date	Time	Round
Saturday, 31 July 2021	9:00; 19:00	Preliminaries; Round 1
Sunday, 1 August 2021	19:00; 21:50	Semifinals; Final

== Results ==
=== Preliminaries ===
Qualification Rules: First 3 in each heat (Q) and the next 1 fastest (q) advance to Round 1.

==== Preliminary heat 1 ====
Rank	Lane	Athlete	Nation	Time	Notes
1	7	Ngoni Makusha	Zimbabwe	10.32	Q
2	8	Fabrice Dabla	Togo	10.57	Q
3	6	Yeykell Romero	Nicaragua	10.62	Q
4	1	Hassan Saaid	Maldives	10.70	SB
5	3	Shaun Gill	Belize	10.88	
6	9	Pen Sokong	Cambodia	11.02	SB
7	4	Sha Mahmood Noor Zahi	Afghanistan	11.04	PB
8	5	Lataisi Mwea	Kiribati	11.25	
9	2	Nathan Crumpton	American Samoa	11.27	PB
				Wind: -0.2 m/s	

==== Preliminary heat 2 ====
Rank	Lane	Athlete	Nation	Time	Notes
1	2	Barakat Al-Harthi	Oman	10.27	Q, SB
2	9	Emanuel Archibald	Guyana	10.30	Q
3	1	Mohamed Alhammadi	United Arab Emirates	10.59 (10.581)	Q, PB
3	5	Banuve Tabakaucoro	Fiji	10.59 (10.581)	Q, SB
5	7	Bruno Rojas	Bolivia	10.64	
6	4	Didier Kiki	Benin	10.69	PB
7	3	Badamassi Saguirou	Niger	10.87	PB
8	8	Ronald Fotofili	Tonga	11.19	SB
—	6	Aveni Miguel	Angola	DQ	TR 16.8
				Wind: 0.0 m/s	

==== Preliminary heat 3 ====
Rank	Lane	Athlete	Nation	Time	Notes
1	6	Dorian Keletela	Refugee Olympic Team	10.33	Q, PB
2	1	Guy Maganga Gorra	Gabon	10.61	Q
3	2	Oliver Mwimba	Democratic Republic of the Congo	10.63	Q
4	3	Ildar Akhmadiev	Tajikistan	10.66	PB
5	5	Jonah Harris	Nauru	11.01	SB
6	8	Scott Fiti	Federated States of Micronesia	11.25	SB
7	4	Seco Camara	Guinea-Bissau	11.33	PB
8	9	Adrian Ililau	Palau	11.42 (11.414)	PB
9	7	Karalo Maibuca	Tuvalu	11.42 (11.418)	NR
				Wind: +0.9 m/s	

=== Round 1 ===
Qualification Rules: First 3 in each heat (Q) and the next 3 fastest (q) advance to the semifinals.

==== Heat 1 ====
Rank	Lane	Athlete	Nation	Time	Notes
1	8	Ronnie Baker	United States	10.03	Q
2	3	Jimmy Vicaut	France	10.07	Q, SB
3	2	Usheoritse Itsekiri	Nigeria	10.15	Q
4	1	Wu Zhiqiang	China	10.18	
5	9	Yang Chun-han	Chinese Taipei	10.21	SB
6	7	Shuhei Tada	Japan	10.22	
7	5	Emre Zafer Barnes	Turkey	10.47	
8	6	Guy Maganga Gorra	Gabon	10.77	
—	4	Tyquendo Tracey	Jamaica	DNS	
				Wind: +0.2 m/s	

==== Heat 2 ====
Rank	Lane	Athlete	Nation	Time	Notes
1	6	Enoch Adegoke	Nigeria	9.98	Q, PB
2	3	Femi Ogunode	Qatar	10.02	Q
3	8	Zharnel Hughes	Great Britain	10.04	Q, SB
4	7	Trayvon Bromell	United States	10.05	q
5	9	Felipe Bardi	Brazil	10.26	
6	4	Silvan Wicki	Switzerland	10.28	
7	5	Samson Colebrooke	Bahamas	10.33	
8	1	Dorian Keletela	Refugee Olympic Team	10.41 (10.405)	
9	2	Emanuel Archibald	Guyana	10.41 (10.405)	
				Wind: +0.3 m/s	

==== Heat 3 ====
Rank	Lane	Athlete	Nation	Time	Notes
1	4	Marcell Jacobs	Italy	9.94	Q, NR
2	9	Oblique Seville	Jamaica	10.04	Q, =PB
3	1	Shaun Maswanganyi	South Africa	10.12	Q
4	7	Ryota Yamagata	Japan	10.15	
5	2	Xie Zhenye	China	10.16	
6	5	Yupun Abeykoon	Sri Lanka	10.32	
7	8	Carlos Nascimento	Portugal	10.37	
8	6	Gavin Smellie	Canada	10.44	
9	3	Oliver Mwimba	Democratic Republic of the Congo	10.97	
				Wind: +0.1 m/s	

==== Heat 4 ====
Rank	Lane	Athlete	Nation	Time	Notes
1	2	Gift Leotlela	South Africa	10.04	Q
2	4	Su Bingtian	China	10.05	Q
3	8	Jason Rogers	Saint Kitts and Nevis	10.21	Q
4	7	Yuki Koike	Japan	10.22	
5	5	Lalu Muhammad Zohri	Indonesia	10.26	SB
6	3	Ebrima Camara	The Gambia	10.33	
7	6	Kemar Hyman	Cayman Islands	10.41	
8	9	Banuve Tabakaucoro	Fiji	10.70	
—	1	Mark Odhiambo	Kenya	DNS	
				Wind: 0.0 m/s	

==== Heat 5 ====
Rank	Lane	Athlete	Nation	Time	Notes
1	9	Andre De Grasse	Canada	9.91	Q, SB
2	3	Fred Kerley	United States	9.97	Q
3	6	Ferdinand Omurwa	Kenya	10.01	Q, =NR
4	1	Filippo Tortu	Italy	10.10	q, SB
5	8	Reece Prescod	Great Britain	10.12	q, SB
6	5	Jak Ali Harvey	Turkey	10.25	SB
7	4	Barakat Al-Harthi	Oman	10.31	
8	7	Mohamed Alhammadi	United Arab Emirates	10.64	
—	2	Divine Oduduru	Nigeria	DQ	TR 16.8
				Wind: +0.6 m/s	

==== Heat 6 ====
Rank	Lane	Athlete	Nation	Time	Notes
1	4	Akani Simbine	South Africa	10.08	Q
2	3	Arthur Cissé	Ivory Coast	10.15	Q
3	6	Paulo André de Oliveira	Brazil	10.17	Q
4	1	Hassan Taftian	Iran	10.19	SB
5	9	Emmanuel Matadi	Liberia	10.25 (10.245)	
6	5	Cejhae Greene	Antigua and Barbuda	10.25 (10.249)	
7	8	Ngoni Makusha	Zimbabwe	10.43	
8	7	Bismark Boateng	Canada	10.47	
—	2	Fabrice Dabla	Togo	DQ	TR 16.8
				Wind: -0.4 m/s	

==== Heat 7 ====
Rank	Lane	Athlete	Nation	Time	Notes
1	1	Rohan Browning	Australia	10.01	Q, PB
2	5	Yohan Blake	Jamaica	10.06	Q
3	6	Benjamin Azamati-Kwaku	Ghana	10.13	
4	2	Kojo Musah	Denmark	10.20	
5	7	Rodrigo do Nascimento	Brazil	10.24	
6	4	Ján Volko	Slovakia	10.40	
7	9	Yeykell Romero	Nicaragua	10.70	
8	8	Mario Burke	Barbados	15.81	
—	3	Chijindu Ujah	Great Britain	DQ (10.08)	R 40.1
				Wind: +0.8 m/s	

=== Semifinals ===
Qualification Rules: First 2 in each heat (Q) and the next 2 fastest (q) advance to the Final.

==== Semifinal 1 ====
Rank	Lane	Athlete	Nation	Time	Notes
1	7	Fred Kerley	United States	9.96	Q
2	6	Andre De Grasse	Canada	9.98	Q
3	9	Ferdinand Omurwa	Kenya	10.00	NR
4	4	Gift Leotlela	South Africa	10.03	
5	8	Jimmy Vicaut	France	10.11	
6	5	Yohan Blake	Jamaica	10.14	
7	2	Usheoritse Itsekiri	Nigeria	10.29	
—	3	Reece Prescod	Great Britain	DQ	TR 16.8
				Wind: -0.1 m/s	

==== Semifinal 2 ====
Rank	Lane	Athlete	Nation	Time	Notes
1	8	Zharnel Hughes	Great Britain	9.98	Q, SB
2	7	Enoch Adegoke	Nigeria	10.00 [.995]	Q
3	3	Trayvon Bromell	United States	10.00 [.996]	
4	4	Oblique Seville	Jamaica	10.09 [.081]	
5	6	Rohan Browning	Australia	10.09 [.083]	
6	9	Shaun Maswanganyi	South Africa	10.10	
7	2	Filippo Tortu	Italy	10.16	
8	5	Femi Ogunode	Qatar	10.17	
				Wind: -0.2 m/s	

==== Semifinal 3 ====
Rank	Lane	Athlete	Nation	Time	Notes
1	4	Su Bingtian	China	9.83 [.827]	Q, AR
2	6	Ronnie Baker	United States	9.83 [.829]	Q, PB
3	5	Marcell Jacobs	Italy	9.84	q, AR
4	7	Akani Simbine	South Africa	9.90	q
5	2	Jason Rogers	Saint Kitts and Nevis	10.12	
6	9	Arthur Cissé	Ivory Coast	10.18	
7	3	Paulo André de Oliveira	Brazil	10.31	
—	8	Chijindu Ujah	Great Britain	DQ (10.11)	R 40.1
				Wind: +0.9 m/s	

=== Final ===
Rank	Lane	Athlete	Nation	Time	Notes
1st place, gold medalist(s)	3	Marcell Jacobs	Italy	9.80	AR
2nd place, silver medalist(s)	5	Fred Kerley	United States	9.84	PB
3rd place, bronze medalist(s)	9	Andre De Grasse	Canada	9.89	PB
4	2	Akani Simbine	South Africa	9.93	
5	7	Ronnie Baker	United States	9.95	
6	6	Su Bingtian	China	9.98	
—	8	Enoch Adegoke	Nigeria	DNF	
—	4	Zharnel Hughes	Great Britain	DQ	TR 16.8
				Wind: +0.1 m/s	
