= Ngermid =

- Village
- Map showing location of Ngermid
- Coordinates: 7°20′20.68″N 134°30′6.65″E
- Country: Palau
- State: Koror

Area
  - Total: 0.29 km^{2} (0.11 sq mi)
- Elevation: 17 m (56 ft)

Population
  - Total: 1,196
  - Density: 4,100/km^{2} (11,000/sq mi)

Ngermid is a village in Koror, Palau, bordering Nikko Bay. The nearby Itungelbai river runs from its source in Ngermid through a short, narrow gorge to the sea.

== Tourism ==
Ngermid is popular for its numerous scattered islands, seas and islets (small islands). There are a few hotels and resorts in the village.

== Economy ==
The economy is primarily driven by subsistence agriculture, fishing and, more recently, tourism.

== History ==
It was formerly part of Koror, then became independent later.
