= Athletics at the 2004 Summer Olympics – Men's 200 metres =

Men's 200 metres at the Games of the XXVIII Olympiad
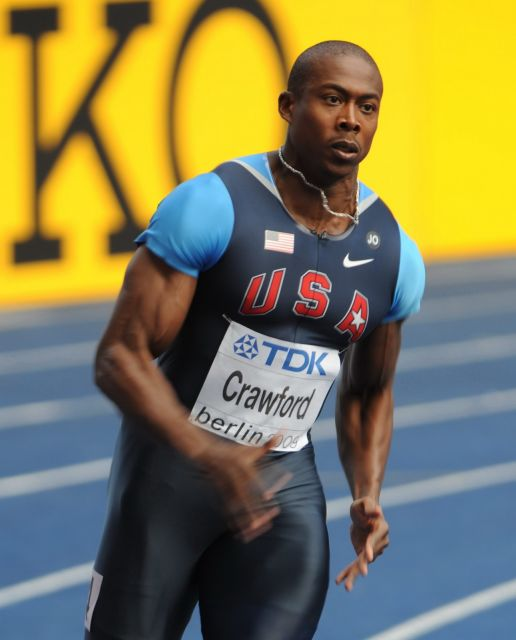
- Shawn Crawford (2009)
- Venue: Athens Olympic Stadium
- Dates: 24–26 August
- Competitors: 54 from 41 nations
- Winning time: 19.79

Medalists
1st place, gold medalist(s)		Shawn Crawford	United States
2nd place, silver medalist(s)		Bernard Williams	United States
3rd place, bronze medalist(s)		Justin Gatlin	United States

The men's 200 metres at the 2004 Summer Olympics as part of the athletics program was held at the Athens Olympic Stadium from August 24 to 26. There were 54 competitors from 41 nations. The event was won by 0.22 seconds by Shawn Crawford of the United States, the nation's 17th victory in the men's 200 metres after missing the podium entirely four years prior. His teammates Bernard Williams (silver) and Justin Gatlin (bronze) completed the sixth American sweep in the event and first since 1984.

Barely turned eighteen, Usain Bolt came to the Olympics injured and was not able to compete at the level he had achieved earlier in the season. He was eliminated in the heats in his only Olympic defeat. He would eventually go on to win double gold at the Beijing Games, and triple at the London and Rio Olympics.

== Background ==
This was the 24th appearance of the event, which was not held at the first Olympics in 1896 but has been on the program ever since. Two of the eight finalists from the 2000 Games returned: silver medalist Darren Campbell and fifth-place finisher Christian Malcolm, both of Great Britain. The 1992 and 1996 silver medalist, Frankie Fredericks of Namibia, had missed the 2000 Games due to injury but returned in 2004. Reigning Olympic champion Konstantinos Kenteris of Greece missed a drug test the day before the Games opened, resulting in his suspension.

Azerbaijan, the Czech Republic, Palau, and Slovenia each made their debut in the event. The United States made its 23rd appearance, most of any nation, having missed only the boycotted 1980 Games.

== Summary ==
The final pool looked similar to the 100 metres final pool, with the favorites, Justin Gatlin, Francis Obikwelu and Shawn Crawford in the center of the track. Bernard Williams also was in the final, along with perennial silver medalist Frankie Fredericks. From the gun, Williams near the inside got a clearly better start, quickly making up a step on the stagger to Crawford to his outside. But through the turn, Crawford maintained the distance while running the further distance. Crawford and Gatlin ran about even last portion of the turn looked more powerful than Williams and Gatlin on either side. By the end of the turn, it was the three Americans in the lead, led by Crawford, Obikwelu the closest challenger a step behind. Crawford separated from Gatlin at the head of the straight and the race was for second. Gatlin held the edge down the straight until the last ten metres when Gatlin seemed to struggle and Williams cruised to silver. Next to last at the beginning of the straight, veteran Fredericks gained steadily and was able to dip past Obikwelu for fourth, but not enough to break up the American sweep.

== Qualification ==
The Olympic qualification period for the athletics ran from 1 January 2003 to 9 August 2004. For this event, each National Olympic Committee (NOC) was permitted to enter up to three athletes, provided they had run below 20.59 seconds during this period in IAAF-sanctioned meetings or tournaments. If a NOC had no athletes qualified under this standard, it could enter up to one athlete that had run below 20.75 seconds.

== Competition format ==
The competition used the four round format introduced in 1920: heats, quarterfinals, semifinals, and a final. The "fastest loser" system introduced in 1960 was used in the heats and quarterfinals.

There were 7 heats of 7 or 8 runners each, with the top 4 men in each advancing to the quarterfinals along with the next 4 fastest overall. The quarterfinals consisted of 4 heats of 8 athletes each; the 3 fastest men in each heat and the next 4 fastest overall advanced to the semifinals. There were 2 semifinals, each with 8 runners. The top 4 athletes in each semifinal advanced. The final had 8 runners. The races were run on a 400 metre track.

== Records ==
Prior to the competition, the existing world, Olympic record, and world leading time were as follows:

World record	Michael Johnson (USA)	19.32 s	Atlanta, United States	1 August 1996
Olympic record	Michael Johnson (USA)	19.32 s	Atlanta, United States	1 August 1996
World Leading	Shawn Crawford (USA)	19.88 s	Sacramento, United States	16 July 2004

No new world or Olympic records were set during the competition.

== Schedule ==
The competition used a three-day schedule rather than a two-day schedule, splitting the semifinals and final into two days. The three-day schedule had previously been used in 1992, but before that had last been used in 1908.

All times are Eastern European Summer Time (UTC+3)

Date	Time	Round
Tuesday, 24 August 2004	10:35; 20:00	Round 1 Quarterfinals
Wednesday, 25 August 2004	22:50	Semifinals
Thursday, 26 August 2004	22:50	Final

== Results ==
=== Heats ===
Qualification rule: The first four finishers in each heat (Q) plus the next four fastest overall runners (q) qualified.

==== Heat 1 ====
Rank	Lane	Athlete	Nation	Reaction	Time	Notes
1	6	Stéphane Buckland	Mauritius	0.185	20.29	Q
2	2	Francis Obikwelu	Portugal	0.243	20.40	Q
2	2	Juan Pedro Toledo	Mexico	0.214	20.40	Q, NR
4	4	Yang Yaozu	China	0.217	20.59	Q, SB
5	7	Johan Wissman	Sweden	0.245	20.60	q
6	1	Paul Brizzel	Ireland	0.179	21.00	
7	3	Nabie Foday Fofanah	Guinea	0.227	21.45	
—	8	Hamed Al-Bishi	Saudi Arabia	—	DNS	
				Wind: +1.5 m/s		

==== Heat 2 ====
Rank	Lane	Athlete	Nation	Reaction	Time	Notes
1	5	Shawn Crawford	United States	0.272	20.55	Q
2	8	Christopher Williams	Jamaica	0.140	20.57	Q
3	3	Marcin Urbaś	Poland	0.174	20.71	Q, SB
4	2	Darren Campbell	Great Britain	0.155	20.72	Q
5	1	Jaysuma Saidy Ndure	The Gambia	0.158	20.78	q
6	4	Leigh Julius	South Africa	0.164	20.80	
7	6	Geronimo Goeloe	Netherlands Antilles	0.167	21.09	
8	7	Basílio de Moraes Júnior	Brazil	0.236	21.14	
				Wind: +1.4 m/s		

==== Heat 3 ====
Rank	Lane	Athlete	Nation	Reaction	Time	Notes
1	5	Frankie Fredericks	Namibia	0.235	20.54	Q
2	3	Malik Louahla	Algeria	0.187	20.67	Q
3	4	David Canal	Spain	0.181	20.72	Q
4	1	Brian Dzingai	Zimbabwe	0.184	20.72	Q
5	7	Heber Viera	Uruguay	0.256	20.94	SB
6	2	Oleg Sergeyev	Russia	0.269	20.95	
7	8	Menzi Dlamini	Swaziland	0.270	21.82	
—	6	Chris Lambert	Great Britain	0.244	DNF	
				Wind: +2.0 m/s		

==== Heat 4 ====
Rank	Lane	Athlete	Nation	Reaction	Time	Notes
1	7	Marcin Jędrusiński	Poland	0.256	20.63	Q, SB
2	2	Tobias Unger	Germany	0.160	20.65	Q
3	6	Joseph Batangdon	Cameroon	0.239	20.92	Q
4	8	Géza Pauer	Hungary	0.257	21.02	Q
5	5	Usain Bolt	Jamaica	0.254	21.05	
6	1	Christian Nsiah	Ghana	0.146	21.06	
7	3	Hamoud Abdallah Al-Dalhami	Oman	0.152	21.82	
8	4	Ryo Matsuda	Japan	0.223	24.59	
				Wind: 0.0 m/s		

==== Heat 5 ====
Rank	Lane	Athlete	Nation	Reaction	Time	Notes
1	7	Dominic Demeritte	Bahamas	0.246	20.62	Q
2	8	Christian Malcolm	Great Britain	0.284	20.62	Q
3	5	Panagiotis Sarris	Greece	0.254	20.67	Q
4	3	Asafa Powell	Jamaica	0.207	20.77	Q
5	2	Jiří Vojtík	Czech Republic	0.179	20.79	
6	4	Dion Crabbe	British Virgin Islands	0.231	20.85	
7	6	Nazmizan Mohamad	Malaysia	0.238	21.24	
8	1	Adam Miller	Australia	0.198	21.31	
				Wind: +2.2 m/s		

==== Heat 6 ====
Rank	Lane	Athlete	Nation	Reaction	Time	Notes
1	2	Bernard Williams	United States	0.207	20.29	Q
2	8	Anastasios Gousis	Greece	0.236	20.44	Q, PB
3	3	Andrew Howe	Italy	0.198	20.55	Q
4	4	Matic Osovnikar	Slovenia	0.203	20.57	Q
5	6	Till Helmke	Germany	0.241	20.72	q
6	5	Oumar Loum	Senegal	0.240	20.97	
7	7	Anninos Marcoullides	Cyprus	0.247	23.94	
				Wind: +1.8 m/s		

==== Heat 7 ====
Rank	Lane	Athlete	Nation	Reaction	Time	Notes
1	2	Sebastian Ernst	Germany	0.220	20.47	Q, =PB
2	8	Justin Gatlin	United States	0.282	20.51	Q
3	6	Marco Torrieri	Italy	0.222	20.68	Q
4	5	Cláudio Roberto Souza	Brazil	0.165	20.70	Q, =SB
5	7	Brendan Christian	Antigua and Barbuda	0.251	20.71	q
6	4	Shinji Takahira	Japan	0.212	21.05	
7	3	Dadaş İbrahimov	Azerbaijan	0.141	21.60	
8	1	Russel Roman	Palau	0.264	24.89	
				Wind: 0.0 m/s		

=== Quarterfinals ===
Qualification rule: The first three finishers in each heat (Q) plus the next four fastest overall runners (q) advance to the semifinals.

==== Quarterfinal 1 ====
Rank	Lane	Athlete	Nation	Reaction	Time	Notes
1	4	Shawn Crawford	United States	0.207	19.95	Q
2	5	Frankie Fredericks	Namibia	0.228	20.20	Q, SB
3	3	Tobias Unger	Germany	0.162	20.30	Q, PB
4	6	Christopher Williams	Jamaica	0.186	20.34	q, SB
5	1	Johan Wissman	Sweden	0.186	20.74	
6	7	Géza Pauer	Hungary	0.241	20.90	
7	2	David Canal	Spain	0.179	21.18	
—	8	Joseph Batangdon	Cameroon	—	DNS	
				Wind: +1.1 m/s		

==== Quarterfinal 2 ====
Rank	Lane	Athlete	Nation	Reaction	Time	Notes
1	4	Bernard Williams	United States	0.217	20.40	Q
2	3	Anastasios Gousis	Greece	0.195	20.46	Q
3	6	Marcin Jędrusiński	Poland	0.194	20.55	Q, SB
4	7	Till Helmke	Germany	0.144	20.76	
5	8	Brian Dzingai	Zimbabwe	0.206	20.87	
6	2	Marco Torrieri	Italy	0.177	20.89	
7	5	Malik Louahla	Algeria	0.175	20.93	
8	1	Yang Yaozu	China	0.162	21.03	
				Wind: +0.2 m/s		

==== Quarterfinal 3 ====
Rank	Lane	Athlete	Nation	Reaction	Time	Notes
1	4	Justin Gatlin	United States	0.220	20.03	Q
2	8	Asafa Powell	Jamaica	0.206	20.23	Q
3	5	Sebastian Ernst	Germany	0.244	20.36	Q, PB
4	7	Matic Osovnikar	Slovenia	0.235	20.47	q, NR
5	6	Christian Malcolm	Great Britain	0.259	20.56	q
6	3	Dominic Demeritte	Bahamas	0.141	20.61	
7	2	Brendan Christian	Antigua and Barbuda	0.182	20.63	
—	1	Marcin Urbaś	Poland	0.162	DNF	
				Wind: +0.5 m/s		

==== Quarterfinal 4 ====
Rank	Lane	Athlete	Nation	Reaction	Time	Notes
1	3	Francis Obikwelu	Portugal	0.191	20.33	Q
2	5	Stéphane Buckland	Mauritius	0.239	20.36	Q
3	6	Juan Pedro Toledo	Mexico	0.276	20.43	Q
4	2	Darren Campbell	Great Britain	0.179	20.59	q, =SB
5	8	Cláudio Roberto Souza	Brazil	0.159	20.64	SB
6	7	Jaysuma Saidy Ndure	The Gambia	0.248	20.73	
7	1	Panagiotis Sarris	Greece	0.184	20.92	
8	4	Andrew Howe	Italy	0.211	21.17	
				Wind: +0.1 m/s		

=== Semifinals ===
Qualification rule: The first four runners in each semifinal heat (Q) moves on to the final.

==== Semifinal 1 ====
Rank	Lane	Athlete	Nation	Reaction	Time	Notes
1	6	Shawn Crawford	United States	0.231	20.05	Q
2	4	Bernard Williams	United States	0.200	20.18	Q
3	3	Frankie Fredericks	Namibia	0.152	20.43	Q
4	2	Tobias Unger	Germany	0.173	20.54	Q
5	5	Anastasios Gousis	Greece	0.205	20.68	
6	7	Christopher Williams	Jamaica	0.164	20.80	
7	8	Marcin Jędrusiński	Poland	0.245	20.81	
8	1	Darren Campbell	Great Britain	0.150	20.89	
				Wind: −0.1 m/s		

==== Semifinal 2 ====
Rank	Lane	Athlete	Nation	Reaction	Time	Notes
1	4	Justin Gatlin	United States	0.195	20.35	Q
2	6	Francis Obikwelu	Portugal	0.244	20.36	Q
3	3	Stéphane Buckland	Mauritius	0.183	20.37	Q
4	5	Asafa Powell	Jamaica	0.236	20.56	Q
5	8	Sebastian Ernst	Germany	0.299	20.63	
6	2	Juan Pedro Toledo	Mexico	0.215	20.64	
7	7	Christian Malcolm	Great Britain	0.239	20.77	
8	1	Matic Osovnikar	Slovenia	0.197	20.89	
				Wind: +0.2 m/s		

=== Final ===
Rank	Lane	Athlete	Nation	Reaction	Time	Notes
1st place, gold medalist(s)	4	Shawn Crawford	United States	0.226	19.79	PB
2nd place, silver medalist(s)	3	Bernard Williams	United States	0.173	20.01	PB
3rd place, bronze medalist(s)	5	Justin Gatlin	United States	0.195	20.03	
4	8	Frankie Fredericks	Namibia	0.248	20.14	SB
5	6	Francis Obikwelu	Portugal	0.183	20.14	
6	7	Stéphane Buckland	Mauritius	0.294	20.24	
7	1	Tobias Unger	Germany	0.153	20.64	
—	2	Asafa Powell	Jamaica	—	DNS	
				Wind: +1.2 m/s		
