= Sydney Francisco =

Palauan sprinter (born 2005)

Personal information
- Born: 24 May 2005 (age 20) Koror, Palau
- Education: Palau Community College

Sport
- Country: Palau
- Sport: Athletics
- Event: 100 metres

Sydney Dirraklai Francisco (born 24 May 2005) is a Palauan sprinter. She qualified for the 2024 Summer Olympics and served as one of the Palauan flag bearers.

== Biography ==
Francisco was born on 24 May 2005 and grew up in Palau. She received her name, Sydney, as her mother, Peoria Koshiba, competed at the 2000 Summer Olympics held in Sydney, Australia. She started competing in the sport of athletics at an early age and at age 13, she began training, as a hurdler under Mizuka Honda of the Palau Track and Field Association. She competed in several events at the 2018 Micronesian Games in Yap, including in the 100m and 400m hurdles, the 200m sprint and the 4 × 100 m relay; she won the silver medal in the 400m hurdles.

Francisco attended Koror Elementary School in Palau, and after she graduated from there, moved to Micronesia in 2019, where she attended Xavier High School on the island of Weno. When the COVID-19 pandemic hit, she returned to Palau and began attending Palau High School. She later attended Palau Community College. She transitioned from competing in hurdles to sprinting at age 15; she then competed in several competitions in the event, including at the BIIAA Athletics Championships, BIIAA Cross Country Seasons, and Belau Games. In 2022, she competed at the Oceania Athletics Championships in Australia, where she participated in the 100m and 200m events and achieved personal bests in both events (13.8s in the 100m, 29.2s in the 200m).

Francisco participated at the 2023 World Athletics Championships in Budapest, Hungary, where she participated in the 100m. Although she finished last in the event, she set a personal best with a time of 13.48 and ran alongside her icon, American world champion Sha'Carri Richardson, and Francisco said that she was "just happy to run alongside Richardson." Later that year, she competed in two events at the 2023 Pacific Games in the Solomon Islands.

In 2024, Francisco competed in the 100 metres at the Oceania Athletics Championships and then in three events at the Micronesian Games. She was selected to compete in the 2024 Summer Olympics in the 100 metres, becoming one of only three Palauans at the 2024 Games. She served as the co-flag bearer at the opening Olympic ceremony, along with Jion Hosei.
