= Jesse Tamangrow =

Palauan sprinter

Jesse Jay Tamangrow (born March 16, 1982) is a track and field sprint athlete who competes internationally for Palau.

Tamangrow represented Palau at the 2008 Summer Olympics in Beijing. He competed at the 100 metres sprint and placed 7th in his heat without advancing to the second round. He ran the distance in a time of 11.38 seconds, a personal best for the athlete.
