= Adrian Ililau =

Palauan sprinter

Personal information
- Born: 21 April 2000 (age 26) Ngermid, Palau
- Height: 5 ft 8 in (173 cm)

Sport
- Sport: Track and Field
- Event: 100 m

Adrian Justin Jimena Ililau (born 21 April 2000) is a former Palauan sprinter.

He ran a personal best time of 11.43 in the 100 metres at the 2020 Summer Olympics in Tokyo, but did not advance beyond the preliminary heats.

He represented Palau in basketball at the 2017 FIBA Under-17 Oceania Championship held in Guam. He received an associate degree in environmental marine sciences at Palau Community College, and his field studies focused on the effects of heat stress on corals. In 2022, Ililau was selected to serve as an international exchange cadet at the U.S. Coast Guard Academy, and he is currently pursuing his undergraduate degree. While at the Academy, he was selected to serve as the Golf Company Commander.
