= Valerie Pedro =

Palauan weightlifter (1976–2007)

- Pedro in 2000

Personal information
- Full name: Valeria Rapatamor "Valerie" Pedro
- Born: 16 November 1976
- Died: 25 March 2007 (aged 30)
- Height: 1.6 m (5 ft 3 in)
- Weight: 69 kg (152 lb)

Sport
- Sport: Weightlifting
Medal record
Women's weightlifting
Representing Palau
South Pacific Games
Silver medal – second place	1999 Guam	69 kg clean and jerk
Bronze medal – third place	1999 Guam	69 kg snatch
Oceanian Championships
Bronze medal – third place	2000 Nauru	69 kg
South Pacific Mini Games
Gold medal – first place	2005 Koror	69 kg snatch

Valeria Rapatamor "Valerie" Pedro (16 November 1976 – 25 March 2007) was a Palauan weightlifter. During her early international career, she won medals at the 1999 South Pacific Games and the 2000 Oceanian Weightlifting Championships. Upon receiving a wild card quota from the International Olympic Committee, she would compete at the 2000 Summer Olympics as the first woman to compete for Palau at an Olympic Games.

For the opening ceremony, she was designated as the flag bearer for the nation. At the Summer Games, she competed in the women's light-heavyweight class and placed 14th overall. Five years later, she won a gold medal at the 2005 South Pacific Mini Games.

== Biography ==
Valeria Rapatamor "Valerie" Pedro was born on 16 November 1976. Pedro would compete at the 2000 Summer Olympics in Sydney, Australia, representing Palau in women's weightlifting. She was one of the first Palauan weightlifters and one of the first Palauan sportspeople overall to compete at an Olympic Games, as the nation made its official debut at the Olympic Games at this edition of the competition. Pedro was also the first woman to compete for the nation at an Olympic Games.

Before the 2000 Summer Games, she competed at the 1999 South Pacific Games in Guam, winning a silver medal in the clean and jerk and a bronze medal in the snatch in the women's 69 kilogram category. The following year, she competed at the 2000 Oceanian Weightlifting Championships held in Nauru. She won the bronze medal in the women's 69 kilogram category with a snatch of 70.0 kilograms and a clean and jerk of 87.5 kilograms, totaling 157.5 kilograms. She received a wild card quota from the International Olympic Committee on 31 July of the same year to compete at the 2000 Summer Games. For her training, she traveled to Nauru in 19 August and met with Pacific Games champion and Olympian Marcus Stephen, stating: "It will be really nice to train with Marcus", hoping to learn some techniques from him.

At the 2000 Summer Games, she was designated as the first flag bearer for the nation during the opening ceremony. She competed in the women's light-heavyweight class for lifters that weighed 69 kilograms or below on 19 September. There, she lifted 70 kilograms in the snatch and 90 kilograms in the clean and jerk for a total of 160 kilograms, placing 14th out of the 15 lifters that competed in the event.

Five years later, she competed at the 2005 South Pacific Mini Games in Koror, Palau, and won a gold medal in the snatch in the women's 69 kilogram category. Later on, she died on 25 March 2007 at the age of 30 due to dehydration.
