= Yuri Hosei =

Palauan swimmer (born 2005)

Personal information
- National team: Palau
- Born: May 20, 2005 (age 20)

Sport
- Sport: Swimming

Yuri Hosei (born 20 May 2005) is a Palauan swimmer. She represented Palau at the 2024 Summer Olympics in the women's 50 metre freestyle. She is the sister of Jion Hosei, who also competed in the 2024 Summer Olympics. Together they carried the flag of Palau at the closing ceremony.

Hosei is a student at Sophia University in Tokyo, Japan, and is a member of the university's swim team. She found out about her and her brother qualifying for the 2024 Summer Olympics after their mother called her while she was studying at a restaurant. She and her brother trained in Geneva a few weeks before the Games.

Yuri Hosei competed in her event on 3 August 2024 at 11:05 a.m., making her Olympic debut. She competed in the third of the heats and swam a personal best time of 30.52 seconds. She placed equal sixth out of the eight swimmers in her heat, finished with a time not enough to progress to later rounds, and placed 64th overall. The eventual winner of the event was Sarah Sjöström of Sweden with a time of 23.71 seconds. After she competed, she praised her mother for encouraging the siblings to train hard. She also stated that she felt encouraged to compete due to other Oceanian athletes competing at the Games and Sophia University's swim team.
