= Palau Community College =

Public community college in Palau

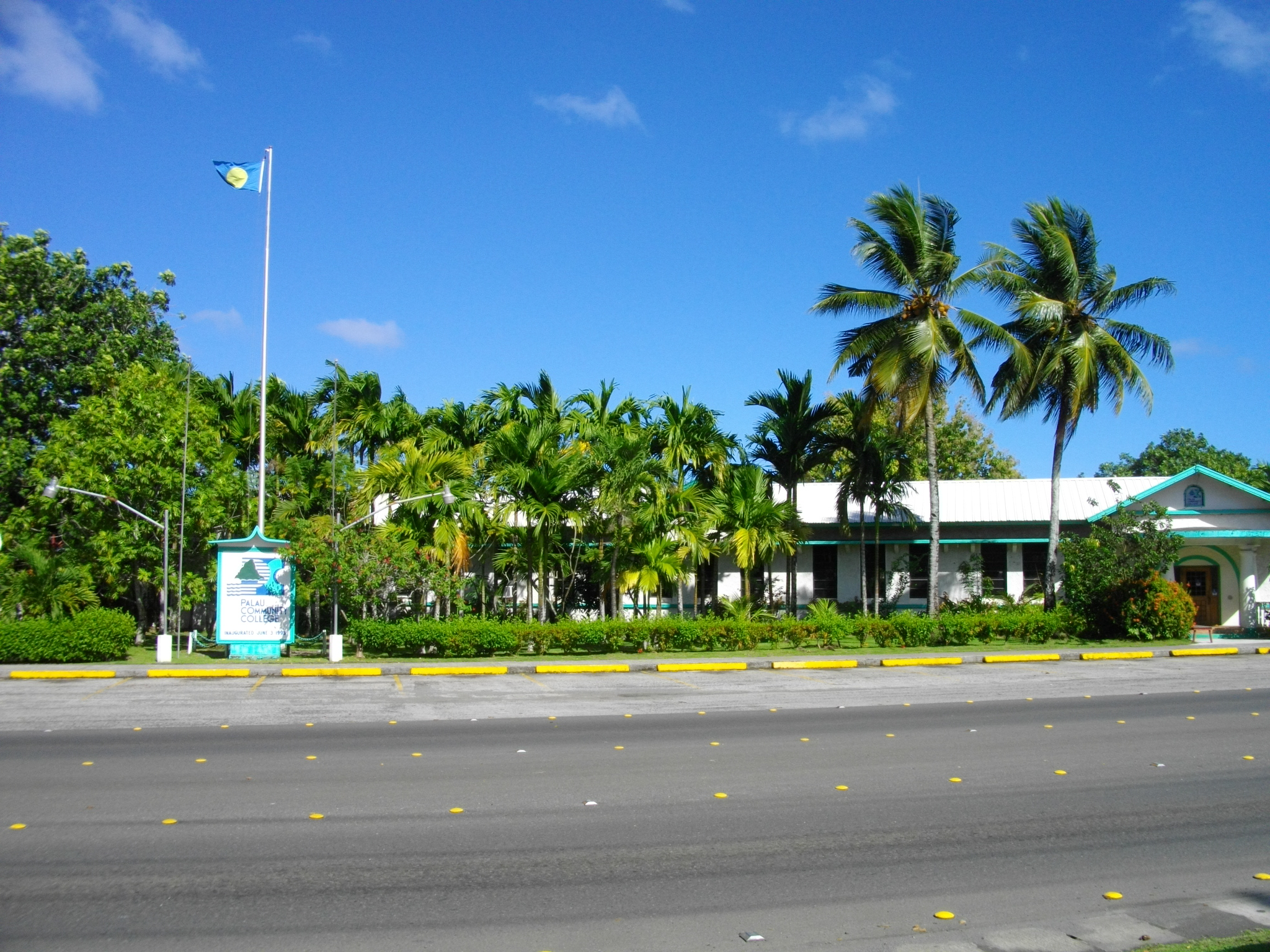
- Established: 1969
- Location: Palau, Koror
- Website: Official website

Palau Community College is a public community college in the Republic of Palau. It is the only higher education institution in the nation. It is an independent institution accredited by the Western Association of Schools and Colleges and offers associate degrees and certificates.

== History ==
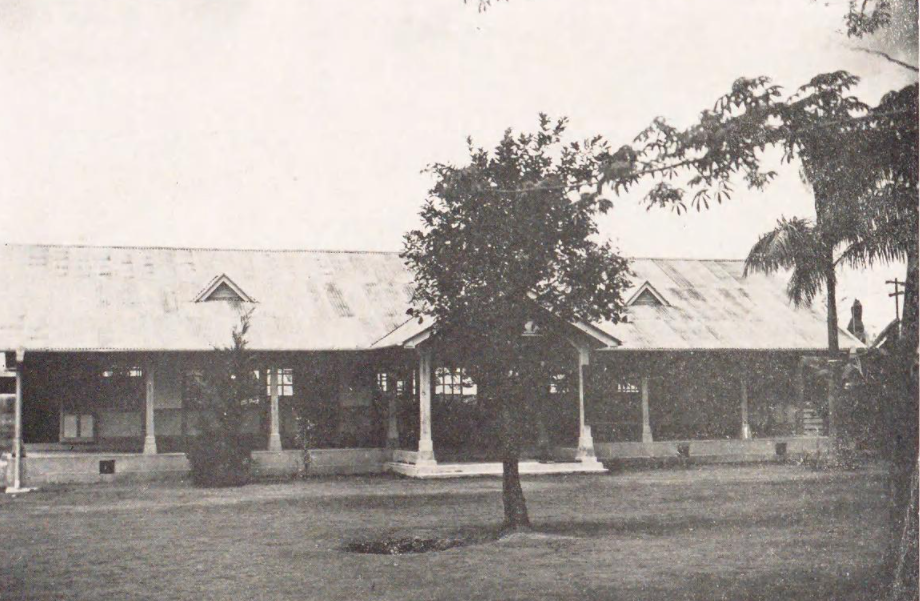
Vocational and technical school around 1932

Palau Community College, together with the College of the Marshall Islands and the College of Micronesia-FSM, offers Micronesia Land Grant programs. There is mention of the Community College having been founded as a vocational and technical school in 1927 when Palau was under Japanese occupation.

In the 1980s, the U.S. Congress designated the College of Micronesia as the Land Grant College of the Trust Territory of the Pacific Islands. This agreement was later extended by the three Micronesian governments, including Palau. On March 19, 1993, the Palau Higher Education Act of 1993 established the college as an independent college with its own governing board. Prior to this, the college was known as the Micronesian Occupational College. On April 2, 1993, it officially became the Palau Community College.
