= Florian Skilang Temengil =

Palauan wrestler (born 1986)

Personal information
- Born: November 4, 1986 (age 39)
- Height: 1.85 m (6 ft 1 in)
- Weight: 125 kg (276 lb)

Sport
- Country: Palau
- Sport: Wrestling
- Event: Freestyle

Florian Skilang Temengil (born November 4, 1986) is a Palauan wrestler at Newman University in Wichita, Kansas. Skilang competed in the 2008 Summer Olympics in Beijing, China in the freestyle wrestling. He lost his bout to Ottó Aubéli of Hungary 0-6, 1-7. However, he managed to score the first ever point for Palauan Olympic wrestlers, since his countryman John Tarkong Jr. had failed to score any points four years earlier, as would his countryman Elgin Loren Elwais in the Greco-Roman -55 kg category.

He competed for Palau at the 2016 Summer Olympics in Rio de Janeiro in the 125 kg division. He was defeated by Daniel Ligeti of Hungary in the first round. He was the flag bearer for Palau during the Parade of Nations.
