= Keesha Keane =

Palauan swimmer

Personal information
- Nationality: Palauan
- Born: 17 December 1995 (age 29); Koror

Sport
- Sport: Swimming

Keesha Keane (born 17 December 1995 in Koror) is a Palauan swimmer. She competed in the women's 50m freestyle at the 2012 Summer Olympics in London finishing with a time of 28.25 seconds in 50th place in the heats.
