= Jion Hosei =

Palauan swimmer (born 2007)

Personal information
- National team: Palau
- Born: May 19, 2007 (age 19)

Sport
- Sport: Swimming
Medal record
Men's swimming
Representing Palau
Oceania Championships
Silver medal – second place	2024 Gold Coast	4×200m freestyle relay

Jion Hosei (born 19 May 2007) is a Palauan swimmer. He represented Palau at the 2024 Summer Olympics in the men's 50 metre freestyle event. He also served as the flag-bearer for Palau in both the opening and closing ceremonies. He is the brother of Yuri Hosei, who also participated in the 2024 Summer Olympics.

Making his Olympic debut, Jion Hosei first competed in his event on 1 August 2024 at 11:26 a.m., which was held in the Paris La Défense Arena. He competed in the fourth of the heats and swam in a new personal best time of 25.67 seconds. He placed sixth out of the eight swimmers in his heat, though he finished with a time not fast enough to progress to later rounds and placed 53rd overall. The eventual winner of the event was Cameron McEvoy of Australia with a time of 21.25 seconds. After he competed in his event, he expressed his gratitude to compete at the Games with his sister.

He participated in the 2024 Oceania Swimming Championships with the Palau men's relay team, which placed second in the 4 x 200 metre freestyle competition. At the 2025 Pacific Mini Games, he recorded a 30.93 in the Mens 50 meter breaststroke. His time in the event decreased to 31.53 at the 2026 Oceania Swimming Championships. He was part of the record breaking Palau swim team at the 2026 Regional Swimming Championships in Fiji. Hosei set a new national record in the 100 meter breaststroke.
