= Palau at the 2011 World Aquatics Championships =

Sporting event delegation

Flag of Palau

Palau competed at the 2011 World Aquatics Championships in Shanghai, China between July 16 and 31, 2011.

== Swimming ==
Palau qualified 3 swimmers.

Men

Athlete	Event	Heats		Semifinals		Final	
Athlete	Event	Time	Rank	Time	Rank	Time	Rank
Shawn Dingilius-Wallace	Men's 50m Freestyle	28.21	95	did not advance			
Shawn Dingilius-Wallace	Men's 100m Freestyle	1:02.53	95	did not advance			

Women

Athlete	Event	Heats		Semifinals		Final	
Athlete	Event	Time	Rank	Time	Rank	Time	Rank
Keesha Keane	Women's 50m Freestyle	29.33	57	did not advance			
Keesha Keane	Women's 100m Freestyle	1:06.15	67	did not advance			
Osisang Chilton	Women's 50m Freestyle	31.07	66	did not advance			
Osisang Chilton	Women's 100m Freestyle	1:07.62	70	did not advance			
