= Osisang Chilton =

Palauan swimmer

Osisang Dibech Chilton
Personal information
- Born: 23 February 1996 (age 30)

Sport
- Sport: Swimming

Osisang Dibech Chilton (born 23 February 1996) is a Palauan swimmer. She competed at the 2020 Summer Olympics, in the women's 50 m freestyle.

== Career ==
She competed in the women's 200 metre backstroke event at the 2017 World Aquatics Championships. In 2019, she represented Palau at the 2019 World Aquatics Championships held in Gwangju, South Korea. She competed in the women's 100 metre freestyle and women's 100 metre backstroke events. In both events she did not advance to compete in the semi-finals.
