= Shawn Dingilius-Wallace =

Palauan swimmer (born 1994)

Personal information
- Born: 26 July 1994 (age 32) Koror, Palau
- Height: 1.84 m (6 ft 0 in)
- Weight: 93 kg (205 lb)

Sport
- Country: Palau
- Sport: Swimming

Shawn Erbelau Dingilius-Wallace (born 26 July 1994) is a Palauan Olympic swimmer. He competed at the 2016 Summer Olympics in the Men's 50 metre freestyle event where he ranked at #72 with a time of 26.78 seconds, a national record at the time. He did not advance to the semifinals. He competed at the 2020 Summer Olympics, in Men's 50 m freestyle.

== Early years ==
Born in Palau, Dingilius-Wallace grew up in Houston from the age of six and graduated from Alief Hastings High School before studying civil engineering at Missouri S&T.

== Career ==
Dingilius-Wallace previously held the Palauan national records in the men's 100 metre freestyle, 100 metre backstroke and both the 50 and 100 metre butterfly.

In 2019, he competed in two events at the 2019 World Aquatics Championships held in Gwangju, South Korea.
