= Flag of Palau =

Palau
- Use: Civil and state flag, civil and state ensign
- Proportion: 5:8
- Adopted: 1 January 1981; 45 years ago
- Design: A light blue field with a large yellow disk slightly leaning towards the hoist side.
- Designed by: Blau J. Skebong

The Flag of Palau was adopted on 1 January 1981, when the island group separated from the United Nations Trust Territory. As with the flags of several other Pacific island groups, light blue is the color used to represent the ocean and the nation's place within it. While this puts Palau in common with the Federated States of Micronesia and other neighboring island groups, the disc on the flag is similar to that on the flag of Japan but is off-centre like that of the flag of Bangladesh. In the case of Palau, the disk represents the moon instead of the sun. The current flag was introduced in 1981 when Palau became a republic.

Previously, the flag of the Trust Territory of the Pacific Islands was flown jointly with the United Nations and American flags. The explanation for the choice of colors is rooted in the history and customs of the Palauan people. The light blue of the field symbolizes the Pacific Ocean, and also represents the transition from foreign domination to self-government. The golden disk, which sits slightly off-center toward the hoist, represents the full moon. The Palauans consider the full moon to be the optimum time for human activity. At this time of the month, celebrations, fishing, sowing, harvesting, tree-felling, and the carving of traditional canoes are carried out. The full moon is a symbol of peace, love, and tranquility.

== Construction ==
Flag construction

According to the Palauan government website, the flag is a golden-yellow full moon slightly off-centered on a field of sky blue. The width of flag is 1^{3}/_{5} of the flag's height, meaning the aspect ratio is 5:8. The moon's diameter is ^{3}/_{5} of the flag's height, its center is placed on the middle of the flag's height and, horizontally, at a ^{7}/_{10} part of the flag's height from the hoist side.

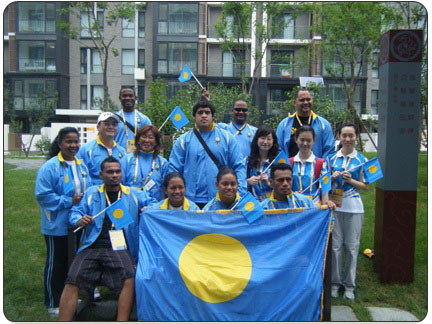
Palau team at the 2008 Summer Olympics with the flag.

The Palau flag flies over the Capitol of Palau.

== Supposed relationship to the Rising Sun Flag ==
Japanese international relations professor Futaranosuke Nagoshi has suggested that the Palauan flag (which depicts the Moon) pays tribute to the Rising Sun Flag of Japan and symbolizes amity between Palau and Japan. Former Palauan President Kuniwo Nakamura responded to this theory in an interview with the ambiguous statement, "That's one way of putting it." John Blau Skebong, the designer of the flag, denied such allegation, saying there is no special connection between the two flags.

== Governmental flags ==
Standard of the president of Palau

Standard of the president of Palau (vertical)

== Historical flags ==
Flag of Spain, from Palau's discovery until 1842

Flag of Spain, from 1785 to 1899

Royal flag of Spain, from 1710 to 1761

Royal flag of Spain, from 1761 to 1833

Royal flag of Spain, from 1833 to 1899

Flag of the First Philippine Republic, from January 23, 1899 to February 12, 1899

Flag of the German New Guinea Company, 1885–1899

Flag of the German colonial empire, in some of Palau from 1885 and all of the territory, 1899–1914

German Emperor's standard, from 1899 to 1914

Flag of Japan used during the South Seas Mandate, 1914–1944

Flag of Governor of the South Seas Mandate

Imperial standard of the emperor of Japan, from 1914 to 1944

Forty-eight-star flag of the United States, 1944–1959

Forty-nine-star flag of the United States, 1959–1960

Fifty-star flag of the United States, 1960–1994

Flag of the president of the United States, from 1944 to 1945

Flag of the president of the United States, from 1945 to 1959

Flag of the president of the United States, from 1959 to 1994

United Nations flag, 1947–1965

Flag of the Trust Territory of the Pacific Islands, 1965–1981

Flag of the Federated States of Micronesia, 1978–1981

== Miscellaneous ==
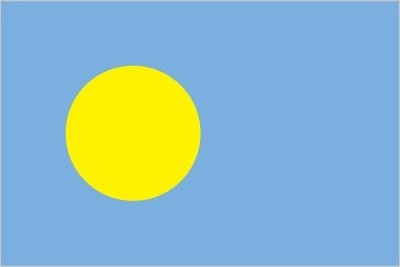
A variant of the main flag as shown in The World Factbook by the CIA

== See also ==
- Flags of the states of Palau
- Flag of Japan
- Flag of Bangladesh
