= List of Federated States of Micronesia records in athletics =

The following are the national records in athletics in Micronesia maintained by Micronesia's national athletics federation: Federated States of Micronesia Athletic Association (FSMAA).

== Outdoor ==
Key to tables: Awaiting ratification Record not kept by FSMAA Not ratified or later rescinded by FSMAA

=== Men ===
Event	Record	Athlete	Date	Meet	Place	Ref.
100 m	10.83 (±0.0 m/s)	John Howard	25 July 2009	GTFA Summer Series	Tumon, Guam	
100 m	10.7 h	John Howard	1 August 2004		Cairns, Australia	
100 m	10.7 h	Danny Fredrick	5 April 2002		Kolonia, Pohnpei, Federation of Micronesia	
200 m	21.65 (+1.4 m/s)	John Howard	27 June 2003	Oceania Cup	Apia, Samoa	
400 m	50.22	Jack Howard	25 July 2002	Micronesian Games	Kolonia, Pohnpei, Federation of Micronesia	
400 m	50.1 h	Jack Howard	7 December 2002		Ballarat, Australia	
800 m	2:01.95	Cornelius Ardos	25 July 2002	Micronesian Games	Kolonia, Pohnpei, Federation of Micronesia	
1500 m	4:19.1 h	Elias Rodriguez	11 July 1990	Micronesian Games	San Antonio, Saipan, Northern Mariana Islands	
3000 m	10:17.75	Keith Daniel Sepety	24 August 2000	Oceania Championships	Adelaide, Australia	
5000 m	16:52.84	Bentura Rodríguez	20 August 1995	South Pacific Games	Pirae, French Polynesia	
5 km (road)	16:58+	Simeon Jacob	20 September 2026	World Road Running Championships	Copenhagen, Denmark	
10,000 m	35:46.1 h	Elias Rodriguez	27 March 1994	Micronesian Games	Mangilao, Guam	
10 km (road)	34:48+	Simeon Jacob	20 September 2026	World Road Running Championships	Copenhagen, Denmark	
15 km (road)	53:12+	Simeon Jacob	20 September 2026	World Road Running Championships	Copenhagen, Denmark	
20 km (road)	1:11:04+	Simeon Jacob	20 September 2026	World Road Running Championships	Copenhagen, Denmark	
Half marathon	1:17:36	Magdano Marquez	July 2014	Micronesian Games	Palikir, Pohnpei, Federation of Micronesia	
Half marathon	1:14:55	Simeon Jacob	20 September 2026	World Road Running Championships	Copenhagen, Denmark	
Marathon	2:52:29	Elias Rodriguez	14 July 1990	Micronesian Games	San Antonio, Saipan, Northern Mariana Islands	
110 m hurdles	16.00	Isaac Saimon	23 July 2002	Micronesian Games	Kolonia, Pohnpei, Federation of Micronesia	
110 m hurdles	15.7 h	Peter Jackson	30 August 1998		Tofol, Kosrae, Federation of Micronesia	
400 m hurdles	57.36	Ronny Ifamilik	23 July 2002	Micronesian Games	Kolonia, Pohnpei, Federation of Micronesia	
3000 m steeplechase						
High jump	1.78 m	Richard Falan	23 July 2001		Abay, Yap, Federation of Micronesia	
Pole vault	3.85 m	Keitani Graham	10 July 2003	South Pacific Games	Suva, Fiji	
Long jump	6.27 m	Henry Edwin	3 July 1969	Micronesian Games	San Antonio, Saipan, Northern Mariana Islands, Trust Territory of the Pacific Islands	
Triple jump	12.68 m	Estephan Dadius	26 July 2001		Abay, Yap, Federation of Micronesia	
Shot put	12.68 m	Rams Ramngen	26 July 2001		Abay, Yap, Federation of Micronesia	
Discus throw	38.15 m	Clayton Maliuweligiye	4 August 2010	Micronesian Games	Koror, Palau	
Hammer throw	23.76 m	James Cook Siugpiyemal	28 June 2006	Micronesian Games	Susupe, Saipan, Northern Mariana Islands	
Javelin throw	56.94 m	Clayton Maliuweligiye	26 April 2003	Micronesian Regional Championships	Koror, Palau	
Javelin throw	56.94 m	Clayton Maliuweligiye	14 June 2003		Santa Rita, Guam	
Decathlon	4871 pts	Keitani Graham	8–9 July 2003	South Pacific Games	Suva, Fiji	
Decathlon	100m (wind) / Long jump (wind) / Shot put / High jump / 400m / 110m H (wind) / Discus / Pole vault / Javelin / 1500m; 12.69 / 4.88 m / 10.78 m / 1.57 m / 56.92 / 19.79 / 33.07 m / 3.80 m / 45.15 m / 5:06.85					
20 km walk (road)						
50 km walk (road)						
4 × 100 m relay	42.12	Federated States of Micronesia; Peter Donis Rudolph; Danny Fredrick; Jack Howard; John Howard	12 July 2003	South Pacific Games	Suva, Fiji	
4 × 200 m relay	?	Federated States of Micronesia; Oliver; Kilafwa; Jacob; Gifford	30 August 1996		Tofol, Kosrae, Federation of Micronesia	
4 × 400 m relay	3:25.49	Federated States of Micronesia; Jack Howard; John Howard; Keitani Graham; Peter Donis Rudolph	26 July 2002	Micronesian Games	Kolonia, Pohnpei, Federation of Micronesia	

=== Women ===
Event	Record	Athlete	Date	Meet	Place	Ref.
100 m	13.09	Rita Epina	29 November 1996	Oceania Championships	Townsville, Australia	
200 m	27.44	Angie Nedelec	24 July 2002	Micronesian Games	Kolonia, Federation of Micronesia	
200 m	27.44 (−0.7 m/s)	Lihen Jonas	10 May 2015	Oceania Championships	Cairns, Australia	
400 m	1:04.41	Adiriana Jack	5 August 1975	South Pacific Games	Tumon, Guam	
800 m	2:34.64	Adiriana Jack	4 August 1975	South Pacific Games	Tumon, Guam	
1500 m	5:26.15	Jaceleen Pluhs	26 July 2002	Micronesian Games	Kolonia, Federation of Micronesia	
3000 m	11:52.84	Atrian Ladore	24 July 2002	Micronesian Games	Kolonia, Federation of Micronesia	
5000 m	21:43.74	Augustin Qumilinda	3 June 2016		Kolonia, Federation of Micronesia	
5 km (road)	25:30+ Mx	Mary Latorres	12 October 2025	Chicago Marathon	Chicago, United States	
10,000 m	48:10.03	Belinda Renmog	4 June 1999	South Pacific Games	Santa Rita, Guam	
10 km (road)	50:34+ Mx	Mary Latorres	12 October 2025	Chicago Marathon	Chicago, United States	
15 km (road)	1:15:26+ Mx	Mary Latorres	12 October 2025	Chicago Marathon	Chicago, United States	
20 km (road)	1:40:34+ Mx	Mary Latorres	12 October 2025	Chicago Marathon	Chicago, United States	
Half marathon	1:34:48	Reloliza Saimon	July 2014	Micronesian Games	Palikir, Pohnpei, Federation of Micronesia	
25 km (road)	2:05:43+ Mx	Mary Latorres	12 October 2025	Chicago Marathon	Chicago, United States	
30 km (road)	2:31:33+ Mx	Mary Latorres	12 October 2025	Chicago Marathon	Chicago, United States	
Marathon
Marathon	3:38:30 Mx	Mary Latorres	12 October 2025	Chicago Marathon	Chicago, United States	
100 m hurdles	17.84	Ashley Apiner	July 2014	Micronesian Games	Palikir, Pohnpei, Federation of Micronesia	
400 m hurdles	1:18.47	Mihner Wendolin	25 July 2001		Abay, Yap, Federation of Micronesia	
3000 m steeplechase						
High jump	1.36 m	Jessica Rablung	23 July 2001		Abay, Yap, Federation of Micronesia	
Pole vault						
Long jump	4.82 m	Angie Nedelec	26 July 2002	Micronesian Games	Kolonia, Pohnpei, Federation of Micronesia	
Triple jump	9.86 m	Angie Nedelec	8 June 1999	South Pacific Games	Santa Rita, Guam	
Shot put	11.45 m	Scalasmara Fathaangin	24 July 2001		Abay, Yap, Federation of Micronesia	
Discus throw	31.59 m	Scalasmara Fathaangin	12 December 2001	South Pacific Mini Games	Middlegate, Norfolk Island	
Hammer throw						
Javelin throw	37.46 m	Scalasmara Fathaangin	26 July 2001		Abay, Yap, Federation of Micronesia	
Heptathlon						
Heptathlon	100m H (wind) / High jump / Shot put / 200m (wind) / Long jump (wind) / Javelin / 800m					
20 km walk (road)						
4 × 100 m relay	52.22	Federated States of Micronesia; Anitra Ligorio; Geraldine Poll; Ashley Apiner; Mihter Wendolin	22 July 2014	Micronesian Games	Palikir, Pohnpei, Federation of Micronesia	
4 × 200 m relay	2:00.7 h	Federated States of Micronesia; Kilafwakun; Salik; Asher; Kingsley	30 August 1996		Tofol, Kosrae, Federation of Micronesia	
4 × 400 m relay	4:30.89	Federated States of Micronesia; Aisina Finas; Maria Ikelap; Vanity Raynold; Stayleen Rimen	28 June 2006	Micronesian Games	Susupe, Saipan, Northern Mariana Islands	

== Indoor ==
=== Men ===
Event	Record	Athlete	Date	Meet	Place	Ref.
55 m	6.87	Johnny Thoew	9 December 2016	UW Parkside Fall Final	Kenosha, United States	
60 m	7.02	Jack Howard	5 March 2004	World Championships	Budapest, Hungary	
200 m	23.83	Johnny Thoew	9 December 2016	UW Parkside Fall Finale	Kenosha, United States	
200 m	23.70 OT	Johnny Thoew	2 December 2016	GVSU Holiday Open	Allendale, United States	
400 m	56.92 OT	Johnny Thoew	14 February 2015	GVSU Big Meet	Allendale, United States	
800 m						
1500 m						
3000 m						
60 m hurdles						
High jump						
Pole vault	3.96 m (Note: outdoor mark ratified as absolute record)	Keitani Graham	12 January 2002	Terrier Cup	Boston, United States	
Long jump						
Triple jump						
Shot put						
Heptathlon						
Heptathlon	60m / Long jump / Shot put / High jump / 60m H / Pole vault / 1000m					
5000 m walk						
4 × 400 m relay						

=== Women ===
Event	Record	Athlete	Date	Meet	Place	Ref.
60 m						
200 m						
400 m						
800 m						
1500 m						
3000 m						
60 m hurdles						
High jump						
Pole vault						
Long jump						
Triple jump						
Shot put						
Pentathlon						
Pentathlon	60m H / High jump / Shot put / Long jump / 800m					
3000 m walk						
4 × 400 m relay						
