= List of Micronesian Games records in athletics =

The Micronesian Games records in athletics are set by athletes who are representing one of the 10 Micronesian Games Council member federations at the Micronesian Games. The games are quadrennial events that began in 1969. The list is compiled from the Athletics Weekly webpage courtesy of Tony Isaacs, and from the Oceania Athletics Association webpage. Dates and some relay teams were determined from the national records publication of the Oceania Athletics Association, from the Pacific Islands Athletics Statistics, from the Marshall Islands Journal, and from the 2006 and 2010 results lists.

The record assignment for the sprints and jumps is tentative, because there is almost no wind information.

== Men ==
Event	Record	Athlete	Nationality	Date	Games	Place	Ref.
100 metres	10.88	John Howard	Chuuk	23 July 2002	2002 Games	Kolonia, Pohnpei	
200 metres	22.15	John Howard	Chuuk	26 July 2002	2002 Games	Kolonia, Pohnpei	
400 metres	50.22	Jack Howard	Chuuk	25 July 2002	2002 Games	Kolonia, Pohnpei	
800 m	1:58.10	Derek Mandell	Guam	5 August 2010	2010 Games	Koror, Palau	
1500 m	4:11.92	Derek Mandell	Guam	27 June 2006	2006 Games	Susupe, Northern Mariana Islands	
5000 m	16:02.73	Neil Weare	Guam	July 2002	2002 Games	Kolonia, Pohnpei	
10,000 metres	33:58.02	Brent Butler	Guam	3 August 1998	1998 Games	Koror, Palau	
Half marathon	1:17:36	Magdano Marquez	Pohnpei	July 2014	2014 Games	Palikir, Pohnpei	
Marathon	2:52:29	Elias Rodriguez	Pohnpei	14 July 1990	1990 Games	San Antonio, Northern Mariana Islands	
110 m hurdles	16.06	Isaac Saimon	Pohnpei	23 July 2002	2002 Games	Kolonia, Pohnpei	
400 m hurdles	57.36	Ronny Ifamilik	Pohnpei	23 July 2002	2002 Games	Kolonia, Pohnpei	
High jump	1.78 m	Joseph Skerritt	Guam	1 August 1998	1998 Games	Koror, Palau	
High jump	1.78 m	Christopher Kitalong	Palau	1 August 1998	1998 Games	Koror, Palau	
Pole vault	3.20 m	Filomena Ngirabedul	Palau	July 1969	1969 Games	San Antonio, Northern Mariana Islands	
Long jump	6.69 m	Florenz Quitlong	Guam	28 March 1994	1994 Games	Mangilao, Guam	
Triple jump	13.39 m	Buraieta Yeeting	Kiribati	27 June 2006	2006 Games	Susupe, Northern Mariana Islands	
Shot put	14.37 m	Fa'aea Talalemotu	Northern Mariana Islands	7 August 1998	1998 Games	Koror, Palau	
Discus throw	41.19 m	Justin Andre	Guam	26 June 2006	2006 Games	Susupe, Northern Mariana Islands	
Hammer throw	51.29 m	Justin Andre	Guam	28 June 2006	2006 Games	Susupe, Northern Mariana Islands	
Javelin throw	60.86 m	Dougwin Franz	Palau	5 August 2010	2010 Games	Koror, Palau	
Octathlon	4475 pts	Leon Mengloi	Palau	3–4 August 2010	2010 Games	Koror, Palau	
Octathlon	100m (wind) / Long jump (wind) / Shot put / 400m / 110m H (wind) / High jump / Javelin / 1000m; 11.57 / 5.86 m / 9.88 m / 54.55 / 17.15 / 1.73 m / 40.98 m / 3:23.55						
4 × 100 m relay	42.82	Christopher Adolf; Jason Rafael; Ashley Oiterong; Hadley Hesus	Palau	8 August 1998	1998 Games	Koror, Palau	
4 × 400 m relay	3:25.49	John Howard; Jack Howard; Keitani Graham; Peter Donis Rudolf	Chuuk	26 July 2002	2002 Games	Kolonia, Pohnpei	

== Women ==
Event	Record	Athlete	Nationality	Date	Games	Place	Ref.
100 m	11.76 (+1.0 m/s)	Regine Tugade	Guam	20 June 2024	2024 Games	Majuro, Marshall Islands	
100 m	11.6 h (+0.8 m/s)	Regine Tugade	Guam	20 June 2024	2024 Games	Majuro, Marshall Islands	
200 m	26.29 NWI	Rachel Abrams	Northern Mariana Islands	21 July 2014	2014 Games	Palikir, Pohnpei	
400 m	61.30	Yvonne Bennett	Northern Mariana Islands	6 August 2010	2010 Games	Koror, Palau	
800 m	2:27.40	Haley Nemra	Marshall Islands	5 August 2010	2010 Games	Koror, Palau	
1500 metres	5:01.50	Leana Peters	Guam	28 June 2006	2006 Games	Susupe, Northern Mariana Islands	
5000 metres	18:51.75	Christina Wicker	Palau	22 July 2014	2014 Games	Palikir, Pohnpei	
10,000 metres	41:26.48	Marie Benito	Guam	July 1990	1990 Games	San Antonio, Northern Mariana Islands	
Half marathon	1:34:48	Reloliza Saimon	Pohnpei	July 2014	2014 Games	Palikir, Pohnpei	
Marathon	3:38:27	Joanne Bonine	Guam	2 April 1994	1994 Games	Mangilao, Guam	
100 m hurdles	16.49	Cora Low	Guam	27 June 2006	2006 Games	Susupe, Northern Mariana Islands	
400 m hurdles	1:13.68	Jacquelin Wonenberg	Northern Mariana Islands	5 August 2010	2010 Games	Koror, Palau	
High jump	1.50 m	Jenae Skerritt	Guam	6 August 1998	1998 Games	Koror, Palau	
Long jump	5.03 m	Aubrey Posadas	Guam	1 August 1998	1998 Games	Koror, Palau	
Triple jump	10.10 m	Jacquelin Wonenberg	Northern Mariana Islands	5 August 2010	2010 Games	Koror, Palau	
Shot put	11.24 m	Chandis Cooper	Palau	26 June 2006	2006 Games	Susupe, Northern Mariana Islands	
Discus	31.69 m	Dolores Rangamar	Northern Mariana Islands	July 2002	2002 Games	Kolonia, Pohnpei	
Hammer	25.21 m	Chandis Cooper	Palau	27 June 2006	2006 Games	Susupe, Northern Mariana Islands	
Javelin	35.98 m (Current design)	Schola Fathaangin	Yap	July 2002	2002 Games	Kolonia, Pohnpei	
Pentathlon	2380 pts	Jacquelin Wonenberg	Northern Mariana Islands	3 August 2010	2010 Games	Koror, Palau	
Pentathlon	4.67 m (long jump), 30.33 m (javelin), 27.91 (200 metres), 27.87 m (discus), 2:59.98 (800 m)						
4 × 100 m relay	52.22	Anitra Ligorio; Geraldine Poll; Ashley Apiner; Mihter Wendolin	Pohnpei	22 July 2014	2014 Games	Palikir, Pohnpei	
4 × 400 m relay	4:24.94	Jacquelin Wonenberg; Yvette Bennett; Liamwar Rangamar; Yvonne Bennett	Northern Mariana Islands	6 August 2010	2010 Games	Koror, Palau	

== Records in defunct events ==
=== Men's events ===
Event	Record	Name	Nation	Date	Games	Place	Ref.
3000 m	10:33.3 h	Ishiro Hairens	Pohnpei	July 1969	1969 Games	San Antonio, Northern Mariana Islands	
Pentathlon	2709 pts	Einer Kebekol	Palau	4 August 1998	1998 Games	Koror, Palau	
Pentathlon	(long jump), (javelin), (200 m), (discus), (1500 m)						

=== Women's events ===
Event	Record	Name	Nation	Date	Games	Place	Ref.
3000 m	11:52.84	Atrian Ladore	Pohnpei	July 2002	2002 Games	Kolonia, Pohnpei	
