= List of Palauan records in athletics =

The following are the national records in athletics in Palau maintained by its national athletics federation: Palau Track and Field Association (PTFA).

== Outdoor ==
Key to tables: Awaiting ratification Record not kept by PTFA Not ratified or later rescinded by PTFA

=== Men ===
Event	Record	Athlete	Date	Meet	Place	Ref.
100 m	10.52 (+1.2 m/s)	Rodman Teltull	8 July 2016	Melanesian Championships	Suva, Fiji	
200 m	21.84 (+0.7 m/s)	Rodman Teltull	8 March 2015	Queensland Open Championships	Brisbane, Australia	
200 m	21.7 h	Christopher Adolf	27 March 2002		Adelaide, Australia	
400 m	49.17	Conrad Rdechor	25 August 2000	Oceania Championships	Adelaide, Australia	
800 m	1:59.16	Douglas Schmidt	23 September 2009	Pacific Mini Games	Nikao, Cook Islands	
1000 m	3:05.15^{†}	Leon Mengloi	15 December 2006	Oceania Youth Championships	Apia, Samoa	
1500 m	4:20.11	Douglas Schmidt	5 September 2007	Pacific Games	Apia, Samoa	
3000 m	9:52.35	Douglas Schmidt	15 December 2007	Micronesian Regional Championships	Yona, Guam	
5000 m	18:25.81	Nicholas Mangham	22 July 2002	Micronesian Games	Kolonia, Pohnpei, Federated States of Micronesia	
5000 m	18:09.18	Kraven Ngirchomlei	7 July 2025	Pacific Mini Games	Koror, Palau	
10,000 m	38:24.2 h	Richard Madrekewet	8 July 1990	Micronesian Games	San Antonio, Saipan, Northern Mariana Islands	
Half marathon	1:28:33	Anthony Singichi	26 July 2002	Micronesian Games	Kolonia, Pohnpei, Federated States of Micronesia	
Half marathon	1:54.05	Marcus Hangaripai	8 April 2006		Koror, Palau	
Marathon	6:21:03	Kambes Kesolai	5 April 2008		Koror, Palau	
Marathon	3:36.07 (Note: not recognized by World Athletics)	Brook Kinz	2 April 2011		Koror, Palau	
Marathon	3:42:25 (Note: not recognized by World Athletics)	Joynal Mize	18 May 2013		Koror, Palau	
110 m hurdles	16.52 (−0.7 m/s)	Leon Mengloi	9 September 2011	Pacific Games	Nouméa, New Caledonia	
200 m hurdles	30.50 NWI	Nicholas Mangham	25 May 2005		Cairns, Australia	
400 m hurdles	1:00.76	Christopher Kenty	14 December 2007	Micronesian Regional Championships	Yona, Guam	
3000 m steeplechase						
High jump	1.82 m	Donovan Helvey	25 April 2003	Micronesian Regional Championships	Koror, Palau	
Pole vault	3.20 m	Filomena Ngirabedul	July 1969	Micronesian Games	Saipan, Trust Territory of the Pacific Islands	
Long jump	6.45 m NWI	Conrad Rdechor	29 May 1999		Koror, Palau	
Triple jump	13.68 m NWI	William Mgirakelau	July 1969	Micronesian Games	Saipan, Trust Territory of the Pacific Islands	
Shot put	14.30 m	Jersey Iyar	11 July 2001		Koror, Palau	
Discus throw	39.32 m	Pelefoti Cooper (Note: Cooper, though of American Samoa origin, transferred to Palau)	10 July 1990	Micronesian Games	San Antonio, Saipan, Northern Mariana Islands	
Hammer throw	25.83 m	Galileo Saiske	28 June 2006	Micronesian Games	Susupe, Saipan, Northern Mariana Islands	
Hammer throw	27.31 m^{‡}	Leon Mengloi	4 October 2006		Koror, Palau	
Javelin throw	60.86 m	Dougwin Franz	5 August 2010	Micronesian Games	Koror, Palau	
Decathlon						
Decathlon	100m (wind) / Long jump (wind) / Shot put / High jump / 400m / 110m H (wind) / Discus / Pole vault / Javelin / 1500m					
20 km walk (road)						
50 km walk (road)						
4 × 100 m relay	42.57	Palau	11 June 1999	South Pacific Games	Santa Rita, Guam	
4 × 400 m relay	3:25.52	Palau; Gwynn Uehara; Joab Kanai; Francis Tkel; Shaquille Teltull	July 2014	Micronesian Games	Palikir, Pohnpei, Federation of Micronesia	

^{†}: result obtained during the octathlon.
^{‡}: probably youth implement, because Leon Mengloi was only 17 years old.

=== Women ===
Event	Record	Athlete	Date	Meet	Place	Ref.
100 m	12.64 (−0.1 m/s)	Ngerak Florencio	7 August 2005	World Championships	Helsinki, Finland	
100 m	12.5 h	Peoria Koshiba	12 July 2000		Koror, Palau	
200 m	26.18	Ngerak Florencio	12 November 2005	Northern Region NTC Qualifier^{†}	Hamilton, New Zealand	
400 m	59.31	Christina Wicker	13 May 2011	WESCO 3A Finals	Oak Harbor, United States	
800 m	2:16.57	Christina Wicker	24 May 2013	Washington State Meet	Tacoma, United States	
1500 m	4:43.70	Christina Wicker	19 April 2014	Sean Collier Invitational	Cambridge, United States	
3000 m	12:36.74	Avon Grace Mazo	26 April 2003	Micronesian Regional Championships	Koror, Palau	
5000 m	18:21.79	Christina Wicker	4 April 2015	Engineers Cup	Cambridge, United States	
5000 m	17:50.8	Christina Wicker	8 April 2018	Good Life Race	Oak Park, United States	
10,000 m	56:35.0 h	Dannette Ricky	15 March 1995		Koror, Palau	
10 km (road)	39:24	Christina Wicker	8 September 2018	Run Mag Mile	Chicago, United States	
Half marathon	1:24:01.1	Christina Wicker	18 February 2018	Austin Marathon	Austin, United States	
Marathon	3:43:31	Jaqueline Keri Telli	9 May 2015		St. Joseph, United States	
100 m hurdles	18.56	Barbara Gbewonyo	27 June 2006	Micronesian Games	Susupe, Northern Mariana Islands	
400 m hurdles	1:15.51	Ruby Joy Gabriel	July 2014	Micronesian Games	Palikir, Federation of Micronesia	
3000 m steeplechase	11:51.13	Christina Wicker	5 April 2014	Engineers Cup	Troy, United States	
High jump	1.55 m	Carissa Subris	13 July 2001		Koror, Palau	
Pole vault						
Long jump	4.62 m	Felicia Saburo	15 December 2005	Micronesian Regional Championships	Susupe, Northern Mariana Islands	
Triple jump	9.97 m (−1.7 m/s)	Sydney Francisco	8 July 2025	Pacific Mini Games	Koror, Palau	
Shot put	11.24 m	Chandis Cooper	26 June 2006	Micronesian Games	Susupe, Northern Mariana Islands	
Discus throw	31.71 m	Chandis Cooper	12 March 2006		Koror, Palau	
Hammer throw	28.92 m	Corrine Hideos	21 June 2007		Koror, Palau	
Javelin throw	40.89 m	Maleah Umerang Tengedik	27 July 2005	South Pacific Mini Games	Koror, Palau	
Heptathlon	2906 pts	Maleah Umerang Tengedik	26-27 July 2005	South Pacific Mini Games	Koror, Palau	
Heptathlon	100m H (wind) / High jump / Shot put / 200m (wind) / Long jump (wind) / Javelin / 800m; 20.06 / 1.33 m / 9.48 m / 31.39 / 4.27 m / 40.89 m / 3:15.97					
20 km walk (road)						
50 km walk (road)						
4 × 100 m relay	51.89	Palau	26 April 2003	Micronesian Regional Championships	Koror, Palau	
4 × 400 m relay	4:26.20	Palau; Ngerak Florencio; Patricia Black; Peoria Koshiba; Avon Grace Mazo	12 July 2003	South Pacific Games	Suva, Fiji	

^{†}: Ngerak Florencio was member of the North Harbour Bays Cougars team (BC or NHBC) that competed at the Northern Region National Teams Competition Qualifiers.
^{‡}: Resident non-national (USA).

== Mixed ==
Event	Record	Athlete	Date	Games	Location	Ref.
4 × 400 m relay	4:23.55	Palau; Tyson Chinn; Teriana Chinn; Ali Kwak; Faith Etpison	8 July 2025	Pacific Mini Games	Koror, Palau	

== Indoor ==
=== Men ===
Event	Record	Athlete	Date	Meet	Place	Ref.
60 m	6.94	Rodman Teltull	18 March 2016	World Championships	Portland, United States	
200 m	23.20	Rodman Teltull	16 February 2018	EIU Friday Night Special	Charleston, United States	
400 m	54.80	Nicholas Mangham	10 March 2006	World Championships	Moscow, Russia	
800 m						
1500 m						
3000 m						
60 m hurdles						
High jump						
Pole vault						
Long jump						
Triple jump						
Shot put						
Heptathlon						
Heptathlon	60m / Long jump / Shot put / High jump / 60m H / Pole vault / 1000m					
5000 m walk						
4 × 400 m relay						

=== Women ===
Event	Record	Athlete	Date	Meet	Place	Ref.
60 m	8.80	Maura Ngirmechaet	19 September 2017	Asian Indoor and Martial Arts Games	Ashgabat, Turkmenistan	
200 m						
400 m						
800 m	2:19.80	Christina Wicker	1 February 2014	Tufts Stampede	Boston, United States	
1000 m	2:55.37	Christina Wicker	15 February 2014	BU Scarlet and White	Boston, United States	
1500 m	4:58.48 y	Christina Wicker	17 January 2015	Bowdoin Invitational #1	Brunswick, United States	
Mile	4:58.48	Christina Wicker	17 January 2015	Bowdoin Invitational #1	Brunswick, United States	
3000 m	9:55.83	Christina Wicker	30 January 2015	BU John Thomas Terrier Invitational	Boston, United States	
60 m hurdles						
High jump						
Pole vault						
Long jump						
Triple jump						
Shot put						
Pentathlon						
Pentathlon	60m H / High jump / Shot put / Long jump / 800m					
3000 m walk						
4 × 400 m relay						
