= List of Marshallese records in athletics =

The Marshallese records in athletics are maintained by the Marshall Islands' national athletics federation: the Marshall Islands Athletics Federation (MIAF).

== Outdoor ==
Key to tables: Awaiting ratification Record not kept by MIAF Not ratified or later rescined by MIAF

=== Men ===
Event	Record	Athlete	Date	Meet	Place	Ref.
100 m	10.39 (+1.9 m/s)	Roman William Cress	15 May 1999	Minnesota Last Chance meet	Minneapolis, United States	
200 m	21.47	Roman William Cress	13 May 2000	MIAC Men's Outdoor Championships	Saint Paul, United States	
400 m	53.56	Joe Jotai	24 July 2002	Micronesian Games	Kolonia, Pohnpei, Federated States of Micronesia	
400 m	50.4 h	Martin Motu'ahala	30 July 1994		Majuro, Marshall Islands	
800 m	2:05.2 h	Martin Motu'ahala	28 July 1994		Majuro, Marshall Islands	
1500 m	4:36.0 h	Lani Mejbon	30 July 1999		Majuro, Marshall Islands	
3000 m	12:03.9 h	Daniel Kibajot	5–7 May 2005		Laura, Marshall Islands	
5000 m	18:39.53	Jesse Napolitani	22 July 2002	Micronesian Games	Kolonia, Pohnpei, Federated States of Micronesia	
10,000 m	40:11.92	Bob Sholar	3 August 1998	Micronesian Games	Koror, Palau	
Half marathon	1:32:32	Jesse Napolitano	26 July 2002	Micronesian Games	Kolonia, Pohnpei, Federated States of Micronesia	
Marathon						
110 m hurdles	18.01	Martin Motu'ahala	23 July 2002	Micronesian Games	Kolonia, Pohnpei, Federated States of Micronesia	
400 m hurdles						
3000 m steeplechase						
High jump	1.72 m	Todd Surber	1 April 1994	Micronesian Games	Mangilao, Guam	
Pole vault						
Long jump	6.35 m	Roman William Cress	1 June 1994	Section 5AA Championships	Brooklyn Park, United States	
Triple jump	11.94 m	Mike Zakios	July 1969	Micronesian Games	San Antonio, Saipan, Northern Mariana Islands, Trust Territory of the Pacific Islands	
Shot put	12.70 m	Rais Aho	26 July 2002	Micronesian Games	Kolonia, Pohnpei, Federated States of Micronesia	
Discus throw	36.04 m	Sione Aho	16 July 2018	Micronesian Games	Abay, Gagil, Yap State, Federated States of Micronesia	
Hammer throw						
Javelin throw	46.83 m	Emelido Digno Jr.	25 September 2010	Oceania U20 Championships	Cairns, Australia	
Decathlon						
Decathlon	100m / Long jump / Shot put / High jump / 400m / 110m H / Discus / Pole vault / Javelin / 1500m					
20 km walk (road)						
50 km walk (road)						
4 × 100 m relay	44.55	Marshall Islands; Balos Ishoda; Reynold Hermios; C. Matthew; Roman William Cress	26 July 2002	Micronesian Games	Kolonia, Pohnpei, Federated States of Micronesia	
4 × 400 m relay	3:36.0 h	Marshall Islands; Martin Motu'ahala; Terry Mote; Daniel Andrew; Joe Asher	30 July 1994		Majuro, Marshall Islands	

=== Women ===
Event	Record	Athlete	Date	Meet	Place	Ref.
100 m	12.79 NWI	Mariana Cress	9 May 2015	Blaze Invitational	Burnsville, United States	
200 m	26.47 NWI	Mariana Cress	9 May 2015	Blaze Invitational	Burnsville, United States	
400 m	58.96	Haley Nemra	28 June 2012	Oceania Athletics Championships	Cairns, Australia	
800 m	2:13.83	Haley Nemra	23 May 2008	4A State Championships	Pasco, United States	
1500 m	4:52.24 (Note: 4:42.24 by other sources)	Haley Nemra	14 March 2009	Aggie Open	Davis, United States	
3000 m	11:06.06	Haley Nemra	7 May 2008	WesCo North Prelims	Snohomish, United States	
3000 m	12:12.7 h	Haley Nemra	23 March 2006	WesCo North	Marysville, United States	
3000 m	13:24.3 h	Emy Trumbell	5/7 May 2005		Laura, Marshall Islands	
5000 m	21:32.75	Haley Nemra	5 August 2010	Micronesian Games	Koror, Palau	
10,000 m						
Marathon						
100 m hurdles						
400 m hurdles						
2000 m steeplechase	7:41.26	Haley Nemra	14 April 2008	Birger Solberg Team Invitational	Bellingham, Washington, United States	
3000 m steeplechase						
High jump						
Pole vault						
Long jump	4.62 m	Rosemaline Watley	20 March 2019		Salem, United States	
Triple jump						
Shot put	11.52 m	Mia Pulianos	21 June 2024	Micronesian Games	Majuro, Marshall Islands	
Discus throw	40.32 m	Mia Pulianos	22 June 2024	Micronesian Games	Majuro, Marshall Islands	
Hammer throw	33.86 m	Mia Pulianos	20 June 2024	Micronesian Games	Majuro, Marshall Islands	
Javelin throw						
Heptathlon						
Heptathlon	100m H / High jump / Shot put / 200m / Long jump / Javelin / 800m					
20 km walk (road)						
4 × 100 m relay	53.88	Marshall Islands; Hemrita Debrum; Mattie Sasser; Mariana Cress; Lani Keju	22 July 2014	Micronesian Games	Palikir, Pohnpei, Federation of Micronesia	
4 × 400 m relay	5:02.28	Marshall Islands; Nelly Ainos; Cherith Fisher; Danica Kabua; Takilang Kabua	28 June 2006	Micronesian Games	Susupe, Saipan, Northern Mariana Islands	

== Indoor ==
=== Men ===
Event	Record	Athlete	Date	Meet	Place	Ref.
55 m	6.20	Roman William Cress	3 March 2000		Collegeville, United States	
60 m	6.70 (heat)	Roman William Cress	8 December 2000		Ames, United States	
60 m	6.70 (final)	Roman William Cress	8 December 2000		Ames, United States	
200 m	21.59	Roman William Cress	26 February 1999		Iowa City, United States	
400 m						
800 m						
1500 m						
3000 m						
60 m hurdles						
High jump						
Pole vault						
Long jump	6.45 m (Note: outdoor mark ratified as absolute record)	Roman William Cress	8 February 2003		Stout, United States	
Triple jump						
Shot put						
Heptathlon						
Heptathlon	60m / Long jump / Shot put / High jump / 60m H / Pole vault / 1000m					
5000 m walk						
4 × 400 m relay						

=== Women ===
Event	Record	Athlete	Date	Meet	Place	Ref.
60 m	8.40	Mariana Cress	21 March 2015		Minneapolis, United States	
200 m	27.78	Mariana Cress	8 March 2015	USATF Minnesota Championships	Minneapolis, United States	
400 m						
800 m	2:19.68 OT	Haley Nemra	12 February 2010	Husky Classic	Seattle, United States	
1500 m						
3000 m						
60 m hurdles						
High jump						
Pole vault						
Long jump						
Triple jump						
Shot put						
Pentathlon						
Pentathlon	60m H / High jump / Shot put / Long jump / 800m					
3000 m walk						
4 × 400 m relay						
