= Marshall Islands at the 2011 World Championships in Athletics =

- WA code: MHL
- National federation: Marshall Islands Athletics Association
- Website: www.sportingpulse.com/assoc_page.cgi?c=2-1154-0-0-0

in Daegu
- Competitors: 0
- Medals: Gold 0 Silver 0 Bronze 0 Total 0

World Championships in Athletics appearances
- 1991; 1993–1997; 1999; 2001–2007; 2009; 2011; 2013; 2015; 2017; 2019; 2022; 2023

The Marshall Islands did not compete at the 2011 World Championships in Athletics from August 27 to September 4 in Daegu, South Korea.

== Team selection ==
One athlete was announced to represent the country in the event due to the preliminary Entry List. However, he did not appear on the Official Start List.

KEY:	Did not participate	Competed in another event

	Event	Athlete
Men	100 metres	Roman Cress
