= Athletics at the 1998 Micronesian Games =

Athletics at the IV Micronesian Games
- Dates: August 1–8
- Host city: Koror, Palau
- Venue: National Stadium (Palau)
- Level: Senior
- Events: 32 (16 men, 16 women)
- Participation: 10 nations

Athletics competitions at the 1998 Micronesian Games were held at the National Stadium (Palau) in Koror, Palau, between August 1–8, 1998.

A total of 32 events were contested, 16 by men and 16 by women.

== Medal summary ==
Medal winners and their results were published on the Athletics Weekly webpage courtesy of Tony Isaacs. Complete results can be found in the Pacific Islands Athletics Statistics.

=== Men ===
Event	Gold		Silver		Bronze	
100 metres	Christopher Adolf (PLW)	11.23	Frederick Canon (NRU)	11.26	Hadley Hesus (PLW)	11.46
200 metres	Christopher Adolf (PLW)	22.62 GR	Frederick Canon (NRU)	22.84	Ashley Oiterong (PLW)	23.45
400 metres	Russell Ward Roman (PLW)	51.07 GR	Einer Kebekol (PLW)	51.23	David Neilsen (GUM)	51.30
800 metres	Neil Weare (GUM)	2:01.40	Einer Kebekol (PLW)	2:01.55	Russell Ward Roman (PLW)	2:05.03
1500 metres	Brent Butler (GUM)	4:18.00	Neil Weare (GUM)	4:29.68	(Chuuk State) Edwin Hartman (CHU)	4:38.86
5000 metres	Brent Butler (GUM)	16:32.32 GR	(Chuuk State) Kostantino Kosy (CHU)	17:46.49	Teinakewe Tamuera (KIR)	17:52.66
10000 metres	Brent Butler (GUM)	33:58.02 GR	(Chuuk State) Kostantino Kosy (CHU)	38:11.46	(Pohnpei State) Rendelius Germinaro (POH)	38:31.64
High jump	Joseph Skerritt (GUM)	1.78 GR	Christopher Kitalong (PLW)	1.78 GR	Palamo Kulene (KIR) (Kosrae) Alokoa Wagok (KOS)	1.76
Long jump	Christopher Kitalong (PLW)	6.33	Kerjoe Rechirei (PLW)	6.22	(Chuuk State) Jefferson Halilito (CHU)	6.07
Triple jump	Kerjoe Rechirei (PLW)	13.06	(Chuuk State) Jefferson Halilito (CHU)	12.57	Christopher Kitalong (PLW)	12.45
Shot put	Fa'aea Talalemotu (NMI)	14.37 GR	Rene Delamar (GUM)	14.26	Jersey Iyar (PLW)	13.08
Discus throw	Rene Delamar (GUM)	40.64 GR	Fa'aea Talalemotu (NMI)	40.03	Pelefoti Cooper (PLW)	34.60
Javelin throw	Clifford Kyota (PLW)	59.64 GR	(Yap State) Clayton Maluwelgiye (YAP)	55.09	Jersey Iyar (PLW)	53.45
Pentathlon	Einer Kebekol (PLW)	2709	(Chuuk State) Jefferson Halilito (CHU)	2547	Wayne Pua (NMI)	2387
4 x 100 metres relay	Palau; Christopher Adolf; Jason Rafael; Ashley Oiterong; Hadley Hesus	42.82 GR	Guam; Ryan Claros; Paul Claros; David Neilsen; Philam Garcia	43.32	Pohnpei; Patrickson Anson; Strickson Anson; Patterson Anson; Detrickson Anson	44.60
4 x 400 metres relay	Palau; Russell Roman; Lindon Johnson; Sngebard Delong; Einer Kebekol	3:28.10 GR	Chuuk; Kuniwo Suananga; Edwin Hartman; Peter Donis Rudolf; Rickey Shorey	3:34.25	Guam; Ryan Claros; Paul Claros; Philam Garcia; David Neilsen	3:35.07

=== Women ===
Event	Gold		Silver		Bronze	
100 metres	Peoria Koshiba (PLW)	13.35	(Pohnpei State) Rhida Epina (POH)	13.44	(Kosrae) Keisy Tilfas (KOS)	13.79
200 metres	Peoria Koshiba (PLW)	27.14 GR	Jacqueline Baza (GUM)	28.05	(Pohnpei State) Rhida Epina (POH)	28.09
400 metres	Jacqueline Baza (GUM)	63.70	(Chuuk State) Evangeline Ikelap (CHU)	64.76	Trudy Duburiya (NRU)	66.80
800 metres	Sloan Siegrist (GUM)	2:30.39 GR	Jenae Skerritt (GUM)	2:34.14	(Chuuk State) Eronin Aisek (CHU)	2:39.90
1500 metres	Sloan Siegrist (GUM)	5:28.35	Jenae Skerritt (GUM)	5:33.78	(Chuuk State) Nofina Sakkam (CHU)	5:39.23
3000 metres	Jenae Skerritt (GUM)	12:43.4	(Chuuk State) Kimie Elvis (CHU)	12:52.9	Ruute Keakea (KIR)	13:13.8
10000 metres	(Yap State) Belinda Renmog (YAP)	54:57.96	Ruute Keakea (KIR)	54:59.74	(Yap State) Anastacia Perogolo (YAP)	54:59.99
High jump	Jenae Skerritt (GUM)	1.50 GR	Carrissa Dkar Subris (PLW)	1.48	(Yap State) Jessica Rablung (YAP)	1.32
Long jump	Aubrey Posadas (GUM)	5.03 GR	Taati Eria (KIR)	4.60	Julie Tokyo (NMI)	4.33
Triple jump	(Chuuk State) Jayrine Dobich (CHU)	9.26	Nerlina Merep (PLW)	9.07	Cherrie Ringang (PLW)	8.61
Shot put	Melanie Nestor (PLW)	10.59 GR	Emiliana Quitugua (NMI)	10.06	Trudy Duburiya (NRU)	9.60
Discus throw	Melanie Nestor (PLW)	30.46 GR	Nicole Wabol (NMI)	29.09	Trudy Duburiya (NRU)	27.89
Javelin throw	Vanessa Mobel (NMI)	32.83	Emiliana Quitugua (NMI)	31.86	(Chuuk State) Sylvia Akapito (CHU)	28.64
Pentathlon	Nerlina Merep (PLW)	1499 GR	Shannon Sakal (PLW)	1431	(Chuuk State) Jayrine Dobich (CHU)	1244
4 x 100 metres relay	Palau; Nerlina Mereb; Cherrie Ringang; Carmella Caleb; Peoria Koshiba	52.37 GR	Pohnpei; Rhina Frederick; Marleen Saimon; Neth; Rhida Epina	53.61	Nauru; Destalena Olsson; Trudy Duburiya; Edouwe Appin; Joline Harris	54.86
4 x 400 metres relay	Guam; Aubrey Posadas; Sloan Siegrist; Jenae Skerritt; Jacqueline Baza	4:25.08 GR	Palau; Cherrie Ringang; Momoe Akuzawa; Shannon Selau Sakai; Peoria Koshiba	4:28.79	Chuuk; Evangeline Ikelap; Omwere; Eronin Aisek; Regina Shotaro	4:33.52

== Medal table ==
The medal table was published.

* Host nation (Palau)

Rank	Nation	Gold	Silver	Bronze	Total
1	Palau (PLW)*	15	8	8	31
2	Guam (GUM)	13	6	2	21
3	Northern Mariana Islands (NMI)	2	4	2	8
4	Chuuk	1	7	7	15
5	Yap	1	1	2	4
6	Nauru (NRU)	0	2	4	6
7	Kiribati (KIR)	0	2	3	5
7	Pohnpei	0	2	3	5
9	Kosrae	0	0	2	2
Totals (9 entries)		32	32	33	97
