= Regina Shotaro =

Micronesian athlete

Personal information
- Native name: レギナ • 正太郎
- Nationality: Chuuk
- Born: September 10, 1981 (age 44)
- Height: 1.52 m (5 ft 0 in)
- Weight: 45 kg (99 lb)

Sport
- Country: Federated States of Micronesia
- Sport: Athletics
Medal record
Women's athletics
Representing Chuuk
Micronesian Games
Gold medal – first place	2002 Kolonia	4x100 m relay
Bronze medal – third place	1998 Koror	4x400 m relay
- Updated on 4 May 2013

Regina Shotaro (born September 10, 1981) is one of the first athletes from the Federated States of Micronesia to participate in the Olympic Games, in this case the 2000 Summer Olympics in Sydney, Australia.

After a career as a 100 metres runner in the Federated States of Micronesia, Regina pursued her education in the United States at Lansing Community College in Lansing, Michigan. Regina is of Japanese descent, and currently resides in Lansing, Michigan. She has won multiple bodybuilding championships, competing in the NPC figure division.

== Achievements ==
Year	Competition	Venue	Position	Event	Notes
Representing Chuuk
1998	Micronesian Games	Koror, Palau	3rd	4 × 400 m relay	4:33.52 min
2002	Micronesian Games	Kolonia, Pohnpei	1st	4 × 100 m relay	52.23 s GR
