= Derek Mandell =

Guamanian middle-distance runner (b.1986)

Personal information
- Nationality: Guam
- Born: September 18, 1986 (age 39) Tamuning, Guam
- Height: 173 cm (5 ft 8 in)
- Weight: 61 kg (134 lb)

Sport
- Sport: Athletics
- Events: 800m, 1500m, 5000m, Half Marathon, Marathon
Medal record
Men's Athletics
Representing Guam
Pacific Games
Silver medal – second place	2011 Nouméa	1500 m
Bronze medal – third place	2019 Apia	Half Marathon
(South) Pacific Mini Games
Bronze medal – third place	2005 Koror	5000 m
Micronesian Games
Gold medal – first place	2010 Koror	800 m
Gold medal – first place	2010 Koror	1500 m
Gold medal – first place	2010 Koror	10 km Road race
Gold medal – first place	2006 Saipan	800 m
Gold medal – first place	2006 Saipan	1500 m
Gold medal – first place	2006 Saipan	5000 m
Gold medal – first place	2006 Saipan	10,000 m
Bronze medal – third place	2010 Koror	4x400 m relay
Oceania Championships
Gold medal – first place	2012 Cairns	1500 m
Gold medal – first place	2011 Apia	1500 m
Silver medal – second place	2006 Apia	5000 m
Bronze medal – third place	2012 Cairns	800 m
Bronze medal – third place	2008 Saipan	1500 m
Bronze medal – third place	2006 Apia	1500 m
Bronze medal – third place	2006 Apia	6km Cross country
- Updated on 6 May 2013

Derek Mandell (born September 18, 1986, in Tamuning, Guam) is a Guamanian middle-distance runner. He took part in the 2008 Oceania Athletics Championships, winning bronze, and 2008 Summer Olympics, where he broke a personal men's 800m record even though Mandell was eliminated in the first round.

He later competed in the 2010 Guam Athletics Championships, where he won two gold medals, the 2011 Pacific Games, where he won a silver medal, and the 2011 World Championships in Athletics, where he set a personal best time of 1:57.11.

He also competed in the men's 800m event at the 2012 Summer Olympics but was again eliminated in the first round.

== Biography ==
=== Early life and education ===
Derek Mandell was an athlete at University of Portland. Mandell joined the team as a walk-on.

=== Olympic career ===
Mandell qualified for the 2012 Summer Olympics in the 800 m middle-distance run with a universality placement.

== Achievements ==
Year	Competition	Venue	Position	Event	Notes
Representing Guam
2004	World Junior Championships	Grosseto, Italy	34th (h)	1500m	4:27.27
2005	South Pacific Mini Games	Koror, Palau	3rd	5000 m	17:12.43 min
2006	Micronesian Games	Saipan, Northern Mariana Islands	1st	800 m	2:03.76 min
2006	Micronesian Games	Saipan, Northern Mariana Islands	1st	1500 m	4:11.92 min GR
2006	Micronesian Games	Saipan, Northern Mariana Islands	1st	5000 m	16:52.85 min
2006	Micronesian Games	Saipan, Northern Mariana Islands	1st	10,000 m	35:47.58 min
2006	Oceania Championships	Apia, Samoa	3rd	1500 m	4:06.35 min
2006	Oceania Championships	Apia, Samoa	2nd	5000 m	16:18.83 min
2006	Oceania Championships	Apia, Samoa	3rd	6 km Cross country	27:12 min
2008	Oceania Championships	Saipan, Northern Mariana Islands	3rd	1500 m	4:05.79 min
2010	Micronesian Games	Koror, Palau	1st	800 m	1:58.10 min GR
2010	Micronesian Games	Koror, Palau	1st	1500 m	4:16.87 min
2010	Micronesian Games	Koror, Palau	1st	10 km road race	37:48.44
2010	Micronesian Games	Koror, Palau	3rd	4 × 400 m relay	3:36.05
2011	Oceania Championships (Regional Division West)	Apia, Samoa	1st	1500 m	4:04.59 min
2011	Pacific Games	Nouméa, New Caledonia	2nd	1500 m	4:02.95 min
2012	Oceania Championships (Regional Division West)	Cairns, Australia	3rd	800 m	1:56.51 min
2012	Oceania Championships (Regional Division West)	Cairns, Australia	1st	1500 m	4:02.81 min
