= Peoria Koshiba =

Palauan sprinter

Personal information
- Nationality: Palau
- Born: 27 June 1979 (age 47) Ngerbeched, Koror
- Height: 1.60 m (5 ft 3 in)
- Weight: 50 kg (110 lb)
- Children: Sydney Francisco

Sport
- Sport: Athletics
Medal record
Women's athletics
Representing Palau
Micronesian Games
Gold medal – first place	2006 Saipan	4x100 m relay
Gold medal – first place	2006 Saipan	4x400 m relay
Gold medal – first place	1998 Koror	100 m
Gold medal – first place	1998 Koror	200 m
Gold medal – first place	1998 Koror	4x100 m relay
Silver medal – second place	1998 Koror	4x400 m relay
Bronze medal – third place	2006 Saipan	3 km cross country – team
- Updated on 6 May 2013

Peoria Koshiba (born 27 June 1979, in Ngerbeched, Koror) is a track and field sprint athlete who competes internationally for Palau.

Koshiba represented Palau at the 2008 Summer Olympics in Beijing. She competed in the 100 metres sprint and placed eighth in her heat with a time of 13.18 seconds, not advancing to the second round. She is currently serving as a coach for young Palauans.

In February 2008, she was elected to the office of the Palau Track and Field Association and re-elected for the period 2012–2016.

== Personal bests ==
Event	Result	Venue	Date
100 m	12.66 s (wind: -0.2 m/s)	(Australia) Sydney	22 September 2000
200 m	26.29 s (NWI)	(Australia) Sydney	19 August 2000

== Achievements ==
Year	Competition	Venue	Position	Event	Notes
Representing Palau
1997	World Championships	Athens, Greece	56th (h)	100m	14.55 (wind: -1.5 m/s)
1998	Micronesian Games	Koror, Palau	1st	100 m	13.35 s
1998	Micronesian Games	Koror, Palau	1st	200 m	27.14 s GR
1998	Micronesian Games	Koror, Palau	1st	4 × 100 m relay	52.37 s GR
1998	Micronesian Games	Koror, Palau	2nd	4 × 400 m relay	4:28.79 min
2000	Oceania Championships	Adelaide, Australia	6th (h)	100m	12.81 (wind: +1.9 m/s)
2000	Oceania Championships	Adelaide, Australia	12th (h)	200m	26.25 w (NWI)
2000	Olympic Games	Sydney, Australia	68th (h)	100m	12.66 (wind: -0.2 m/s)
2001	World Championships	Edmonton, Canada	53rd (h)	100m	13.50 (wind: -1.3 m/s)
2003	South Pacific Games	Suva, Fiji	10th (h)	100m	13.75 (wind: -3.2 m/s)
2003	South Pacific Games	Suva, Fiji	9th (h)	200m	27.06 (wind: -2.3 m/s)
2003	South Pacific Games	Suva, Fiji	4th	4 × 400 m relay	4:26.20
2006	Micronesian Games	Saipan, Northern Mariana Islands	4th	100m	13.62 (wind: 0.0 m/s)
2006	Micronesian Games	Saipan, Northern Mariana Islands	4th	3 km Cross-country	12:40.09
2006	Micronesian Games	Saipan, Northern Mariana Islands	1st	4 × 100 m relay	52.25 s
2006	Micronesian Games	Saipan, Northern Mariana Islands	1st	4 × 400 m relay	4:29.01 min
2006	Micronesian Games	Saipan, Northern Mariana Islands	3rd	3 km Cross country – Team	23 pts
2008	Oceania Championships	Saipan, Northern Mariana Islands	12th (h)	100m	13.60 (wind: -2.1 m/s)
2008	Oceania Championships	Saipan, Northern Mariana Islands	9th	200m	27.49 (wind: -0.4 m/s)
2008	Olympic Games	Beijing, China	74th (h)	100m	13.18 (wind: -0.8 m/s)
2014	Micronesian Games	Palikir, Pohnpei	4th	4 × 100 m relay	54.06
2014	Oceania Masters Championships (35y-39y)	Rarotonga, Cook Islands	1st	60m	8.75 (wind: +1.8 m/s)
