= Kirika =

Kirika may refer to:

== Fictional characters ==
- Kirika Yuumura, in the Japanese anime TV series Noir
- Kirika, in the comic book Age of Apocalypse
- Kirika, alias Sayoko Tsukikage, in the metaseries Kousoku Sentai Turboranger
- Kirika Kagarigi, in the Japanese manga Kagihime Monogatari Eikyū Alice Rondo
- Kirika Karasuma, in the Japanese manga Kamichama Karin
- Kirika Tachibana, in the Japanese light novel series Kaze no Stigma
- Kirika Misono, in the Japanese manga series Eiken
- Kirika Akatsuki, in the Japanese anime television franchise Symphogear

== Other uses ==
- Wally Kirika (b. 1982-10-27), sprinter
- Kirika, Bisoro, a colline of Burundi
