= Cora Alicto =

Guamanian sprinter (born 1980)

Personal information
- Full name: Cora Low
- Nationality: Guam
- Born: August 2, 1980 (age 45)
- Height: 1.68 m (5 ft 6 in)
- Weight: 59 kg (130 lb)

Sport
- Sport: Athletics
Medal record
Women's athletics
Representing Guam
Micronesian Games
Gold medal – first place	2006 Saipan	100 m hurdles
Gold medal – first place	2006 Saipan	Long jump
Silver medal – second place	2006 Saipan	100 m
- Updated on 7 May 2013

Cora Alicto (Low) (born August 2, 1980) is a track and field sprint athlete who competes internationally for Guam.

Alicto represented Guam at the 2008 Summer Olympics in Beijing. She competed at the 100 metres sprint and placed seventh in her heat without advancing to the second round. She ran the distance in a time of 13.31 seconds.

== Achievements ==
Year	Competition	Venue	Position	Event	Notes
Representing Guam
2006	Micronesian Games	Saipan, Northern Mariana Islands	2nd	100 m	13.10 s (wind: +0.0 m/s)
2006	Micronesian Games	Saipan, Northern Mariana Islands	1st	100 m hurdles	16.49 s (wind: NWI) GR
2006	Micronesian Games	Saipan, Northern Mariana Islands	1st	Long jump	4.66 m w (wind: +3.0 m/s)
