= Palau Track and Field Association =

Sports governing body in Palau

- Sport: Athletics
- Abbreviation: PTFA
- Founded: 1994
- Affiliation: IAAF
- Affiliation date: 1997
- Regional affiliation: OAA
- Headquarters: Koror
- Vice president: Marcy Andrew
- Secretary: Peoria Koshiba
- (Palau)

The Palau Track and Field Association (PTFA) is the governing body for the sport of athletics in Palau.

== History ==
Athletes from Palau participated already successful at the 1969 Micronesian Games, (Palau then still being part of the Trust Territory of the Pacific Islands,) and also after re-establishment of the Games in 1990.

The foundation of PTFA is reported for 1994, as well as its affiliation to the IAAF in the year 1997.

Laura Mangham served as president of PTFA. She was re-elected in October 2003, and in November 2004.

The former president was Regis Akitaya elected in February 2008, and re-elected for the period 2012-2016.

== Affiliations ==
- International Association of Athletics Federations (IAAF)
- Oceania Athletics Association (OAA)

Moreover, it is part of the following national organisations:

- Palau National Olympic Committee (PNOC)

== National records ==
PTFA maintains the Palauan records in athletics.
