= Marshall Islands Athletics =

Governing body of athletics in the Marshall Islands

Marshall Islands Athletics Federation
- Sport: Athletics
- Abbreviation: MIAF
- Founded: 1987
- Affiliation: IAAF
- Affiliation date: 1987
- Regional affiliation: OAA
- Headquarters: Majuro
- President: Rais Aho
- Vice president(s): Carlon Zedkaia; Edison Metwejla
- Secretary: Eunice Borero

Official website
- www.foxsportspulse.com/assoc_page.cgi?c=2-1154-0-0-0
- (Marshall Islands)

Marshall Islands Athletics, also known as Marshall Islands Athletics Federation (MIAF) is the governing body for the sport of athletics in Marshall Islands.

== History ==
Athletes from the Marshall Islands participated already at the 1969 Micronesian Games, (the Marshall Islands then still being part of the Trust Territory of the Pacific Islands,) and also after re-establishment of the Games in 1990.

The foundation of MIAF is reported for 1987, as well as its affiliation to the IAAF in the same year.

Melvin Majmeto served as president of MIAF.

Current president is former shot putter and discus thrower Rais Aho.

== Affiliations ==
- International Association of Athletics Federations (IAAF)
- Oceania Athletics Association (OAA)

Moreover, it is part of the following national organisations:

- Marshall Islands National Olympic Committee (MINOC)

== National records ==
MIAF maintains the Marshallese records in athletics.
