= Marshall Islands at the 2023 World Athletics Championships =

- Flag of the Marshall Islands
- WA code: MHL

in Budapest, Hungary 19 August 2023 – 27 August 2023
- Competitors: 1 (1 man and 0 women)
- Medals: Gold 0 Silver 0 Bronze 0 Total 0

World Athletics Championships appearances
- 1991; 1993–1997; 1999; 2001–2007; 2009; 2011; 2013; 2015; 2017; 2019; 2022; 2023; 2025

The Marshall Islands competed at the 2023 World Athletics Championships in Budapest, Hungary, which were held from 19 to 27 August 2023. The athlete delegation of the country was composed of one competitor, sprinter Ty'ree Langidrik who competed in the men's 100 metres. He qualified for the Championships upon being selected by the Marshall Islands Athletics. In the preliminary round, Langidrik set a new personal best in the event though failed to advance further as he placed seventh in his heat.

== Background ==
The 2023 World Athletics Championships in Budapest, Hungary, were held from 19 to 27 August 2023. The Championships were held at the National Athletics Centre. To qualify for the World Championships, athletes had to reach an entry standard (e.g. time or distance), place in a specific position at select competitions, be a wild card entry, or qualify through their World Athletics Ranking at the end of the qualification period.

As the Marshall Islands did not meet any of the four standards, they could send either one male or one female athlete in one event of the Championships who has not yet qualified. The Marshall Islands Athletics selected sprinter Ty'ree Langidrik, who would compete in the men's 100 metres. In the entry list for the Championships, he held a personal and season's best of 11.92 seconds in the event. Before the Championships, he represented Micronesia at the 2022 Oceania Athletics Cup and ran in a time of 11.86 seconds for the event.

== Results ==
Key

- Q = Qualified for the next round
- q = Qualified for the next round as a fastest loser or, in field events, by position without achieving the qualifying target
- NR = National record
- PB = Personal best
- SB = Season best
- N/A = Round not applicable for the event

=== Men ===
Langidrik competed in the third preliminary round heat on 19 August against seven other sprinters. There, he recorded a personal best time of 11.78 seconds and placed seventh, failing to advance further as only the top two of each heat and the two next fastest would be able to do so.

Track and road events

Athlete	Event	Preliminary		Heat		Semifinal		Final	
Athlete	Event	Result	Rank	Result	Rank	Result	Rank	Result	Rank
Ty'ree Langidrik	100 metres	11.78 PB	7	Did not advance					
