= Athletics at the 2005 South Pacific Mini Games =

Athletics at the VII South Pacific Mini Games
- Dates: July 25–29
- Host city: Koror, Palau
- Venue: National Stadium
- Level: Senior
- Events: 39 (20 men, 19 women)
- Participation: 144 athletes from 15 nations

Athletics competitions at the 2005 South Pacific Mini Games were held at the National Stadium in Koror, Palau, between July 25–29, 2005.

A total of 39 events were contested, 20 by men and 19 by women.

== Medal summary ==
Medal winners and their results were published on the Athletics Weekly webpage courtesy of Tony Isaacs and Børre Lilloe, and on the Oceania Athletics Association webpage by Bob Snow. Complete results can also be found on the Oceania Athletics Association, the Palau Track and Field Association, and on the Athletics PNG webpages.

Placings where no medal was awarded are highlighted in sky blue^{a}

=== Men ===
Event	Gold		Silver		Bronze	
100 metres (wind: +0.5 m/s)	Moses Kamut (VAN)	10.64	Jone Delai (FIJ)	10.73	Wally Kirika (PNG)	10.84
200 metres (wind: +1.7 m/s)	Iliesa Namosimalua (FIJ)	21.54	Moses Kamut (VAN)	21.67	Lesia Vanawalu (FIJ)	22.03
400 metres	Waisea Finau (FIJ)	48.78	Niko Verekauta (FIJ)	49.55	Iliesa Namosimalua (FIJ)	49.79
800 metres	Isireli Naikelekelevesi (FIJ)	1:53.01	Setefano Mika (SAM)	1:53.68	Chris Bais (PNG)	1:55.08
1500 metres	Setefano Mika (SAM)	4:01.33	Isireli Naikelekelevesi (FIJ)	4:01.90	Chris Bais (PNG)	4:05.45
5000 metres	Sapolai Yao (PNG)	15:59.72	Rodney Rapasi Gapirongo (SOL)	16:50.57	Derek Mandell (GUM)^{a}	17:12.43
10000 metres	Sapolai Yao (PNG)	33:49.40	Chris Votu (SOL)	34:46.40	Noel Waimea (SOL)	35:14.76
Half Marathon	Chris Votu (SOL)	1:18:51	Rajendra Singh (FIJ)	1:20:03	Noel Waimea (SOL)	1:20:27
110 metres hurdles (wind: +0.6 m/s)	Aleki Toetu'u Sapoi (TGA)	15.11	Jacques Xenihatre (NCL)	15.26	John Wainiqolo (FIJ)^{a}	16.14
400 metres hurdles	Aleki Toetu'u Sapoi (TGA)	53.89	Meli Cama (FIJ)	55.65	Kumimo'ui Uhila (TGA)	55.88
High jump	Rajendra Prasad (FIJ)	1.95	Xavier Fenuafanote (NCL)	1.80	Donovan Helvey (PLW)^{a}	1.80
Long jump	Eroni Tuivanuavou (FIJ)	7.10 (wind: -2.1 m/s)	Melvin Hamou (NCL)	6.84 (wind: -1.8 m/s)	Harmon Harmon (COK)	6.69 (wind: -3.4 m/s)
Triple jump	Sandy Katusele (PNG)	14.40 (wind: -2.1 m/s)	Jacques Xenihatre (NCL)	14.14 (wind: -1.7 m/s)	Kumimo'ui Uhila (TGA)	13.67 (wind: -0.8 m/s)
Shot put	Shaka Sola (SAM)	17.74	Aukusitino Hoatau (WLF)	17.58	Lolésio Iloai (WLF)	15.72
Discus throw	Aukusitino Hoatau (WLF)	52.80	Shaka Sola (SAM)	49.33	Justin Andre (GUM)	43.87
Hammer throw	Faleono Seve (SAM)	54.11	Justin Andre (GUM)	52.77	Brentt Jones (NFK)	52.52
Javelin throw	Jacky Tuakoifenua (WLF)	63.44	Iosefo Vuloaloa (FIJ)	59.97	Rodolphe Vili (NCL)	57.06
Octathlon	Harmon Harmon (COK)	4719	Iosefo Vuloaloa (FIJ)	4710	Rémy Ihmanang (NCL)^{a}	4291
4 x 100 metres relay	Papua New Guinea; Kupun Wisil; Wally Kirika; Edward Buidal; Anton Lui	41.92	Fiji; Eroni Tuivanuavou; Iliesa Namosimalua; Lesia Vanawalu; Jone Delai	41.97	Federated States of Micronesia; Peter Donis Rudolf; Jack Howard; Jesse Hairens; John Howard	42.83
4 x 400 metres relay	Fiji; Niko Verekauta; Iliesa Namosimalua; Isireli Naikelekelevesi; Waisea Finau	3:18.26	Papua New Guinea; Fabian Nuilai; Kupun Wisil; Joshiah Sasanui; Chris Bais	3:21.23	Solomon Islands; Jonah Hone; William Taloga; Hugo Hebala; Chris Walasi	3:28.15

=== Women ===
Event	Gold		Silver		Bronze	
100 metres (wind: 0.1 m/s)	Mae Koime (PNG)	12.03	Litiana Miller (FIJ)	12.38	Toea Wisil (PNG)	12.43
200 metres (wind: 2.1 m/s)	Mae Koime (PNG)	24.69 w	Sera Tuinalase (FIJ)	25.39 w	Toea Wisil (PNG)	25.65 w
400 metres	Mae Koime (PNG)	57.10	Toea Wisil (PNG)	57.91	Mereoni Raluve (FIJ)	59.11
800 metres	Salome Dell (PNG)	2:21.83	Merelaisa Dawaqa (FIJ)	2:21.88	Cecilia Kumalalamene (PNG)	2:22.24
1500 metres	Mary Sloan Siegrist (GUM)	4:54.88	Salome Dell (PNG)	5:00.60	Leana Peters (GUM)	5:15.75
5000 metres	Leana Peters (GUM)	21:06.72	Linda Tora (SOL)	21:39.76	Nicole Layson (GUM)^{a}	22:38.82
10000 metres	Linda Tora (SOL)	46:22.10	June Fataea (SOL)^{a}	47:52.81		
100 metres hurdles (wind: 1.5 m/s)	Milika Tuivanuavou (FIJ)	16.70	Ledua Baker Taleiviti (FIJ)	17.47	Kristen Mendiola (GUM)^{a}	17.70
400 metres hurdles	Merolyn Auga (PNG)	67.15	Ledua Baker Taleiviti (FIJ)^{a}	68.55		
High jump	Milika Tuivanuavou (FIJ)	1.45	Joycelyn Taurikeni (SOL)^{a}	1.30		
Long jump	Fanny See (NCL)	5.60 (wind: -0.8 m/s)	Milika Tuivanuavou (FIJ)^{a}	5.50 (wind: +0.4 m/s)	Soko Salaqiqi (FIJ)^{a}	5.25 (wind: +0.0 m/s)
Triple jump	Soko Salaqiqi (FIJ)	11.43 (wind: -1.6 m/s)	Fanny See (NCL)^{a}	10.64 (wind: -2.1 m/s)		
Shot put	Ana Po'uhila (TGA)	16.92	Melehifo Uhi (TGA)	14.27	Tereapii Tapoki (COK)	13.85
Discus throw	Melehifo Uhi (TGA)	51.60	Tereapii Tapoki (COK)	48.32	Ana Po'uhila (TGA)	45.69
Hammer throw	Patricia Kolivai (NCL)	45.49	Suzy Vercoe (NFK)	41.78	Siniva Marsters (COK)	41.69
Javelin throw	Serafina Akeli (SAM)	52.26	Linda Selui (NCL)	50.23	Tereapii Tapoki (COK)	43.78
Heptathlon	Milika Tuivanuavou (FIJ)	3559	Maleah Umerang Tengadik (PLW)^{a}	2906		
4 x 100 metres relay	Fiji; Litiana Miller; Sera Tuinalase; Mereoni Raluve; Tahitia Kamea	48.52	Papua New Guinea^{a} Toea Wisil; Mae Koime; Nessie Ogisi; Winai Waro	49.16		
4 x 400 metres relay	Papua New Guinea; Toea Wisil; Maria Kaupa; Salome Dell; Mae Koime	3:58.97	Fiji; Mereoni Raluve; Merelaisa Dawaqa; Sera Tuinalase; Soko Salaniqiqi	4:03.51	Solomon Islands^{a} Pauline Kwalea; Joycelyn Taurikeni; June Fataea; Elisabeth Gaobata	4:26.91

== Medal table (unofficial) ==
* Host nation (Palau)

Rank	Nation	Gold	Silver	Bronze	Total
1	Fiji	11	13	3	27
2	Papua New Guinea	10	3	6	19
3	Samoa	4	2	0	6
4	Tonga	4	1	3	8
5	New Caledonia	2	5	1	8
6	Solomon Islands	2	3	3	8
7	Guam	2	1	2	5
8	Wallis and Futuna	2	1	1	4
9	Cook Islands	1	1	4	6
10	Vanuatu	1	1	0	2
11	Norfolk Island	0	1	1	2
12	Federated States of Micronesia	0	0	1	1
13	Palau*^{b}	0	0	0	0
Totals (13 entries)		39	32	25	96

== Participation (unofficial) ==
The official start list contains 144 athletes (90 men, 54 women) from 17 countries. However, in the result lists, the announced athletes from Kiribati (6) and Nauru (1) did not appear, but only athletes from the following 15 countries:

- Cook Islands (3)
- Fiji (26)
- Guam (9)
- Marshall Islands (7)
- Federated States of Micronesia (8)
- New Caledonia (15)
- Norfolk Island (2)
- Northern Mariana Islands (2)
- Palau (13)
- Papua New Guinea (21)
- Samoa (6)
- Solomon Islands (16)
- Tonga (4)
- Vanuatu (1)
- Wallis and Futuna (4)

== Notes ==
^ a No medal awarded for place-getters where insufficient competitors took part in an event.

^ b Host nation Palau had a second-placed athlete and a third-placed athlete, but they were not awarded medals as insufficient competitors took part in those events.
