= Trudy Duburiya =

Nauruan sprinter

Personal information
- Nationality: Nauru
- Born: 13 January 1976 (age 50)
- Spouse: Michael Aroi (since 1999)

Sport
- Country: Nauru
- Sport: Track and field

Achievements and titles
- Personal bests: 400m - 66.80 NR; 100m - 14.34

Trudy Duburiya is a Nauruan track and field sprinter.

== Sports career ==
She competed at the 1991 World Championships in Athletics in Tokyo, where she finished 6th in the 100 meters qualifying race with a time of 14.34.

She participated in the 1993 South Pacific Mini Games, where she participated in the 100 m and the 200 m race where she scored 7th place in the qualifying heat and 7th place in the semi-final respectively.

Duburiya won a bronze medal twice in the 400 meters at the 1994 and the 1998 Micronesian Games. In 1998 Micronesian Games, she also won a bronze medal in the shot put and discus throw.

== Personal career ==
Trudy is from Anetan district. She married Michael Aroi in 1999.
