= Athletics at the 1994 Micronesian Games =

Athletics at the III Micronesian Games
- Dates: March 27 - April 2
- Host city: Mangilao, Guam
- Level: Senior
- Events: 32 (16 men, 16 women)

Athletics competitions at the 1994 Micronesian Games were held in Mangilao, Guam, between March 27 - April 2, 1994.

A total of 32 events were contested, 16 by men and 16 by women.

== Medal summary ==
Medal winners and their results were published on the Athletics Weekly webpage courtesy of Tony Isaacs. Complete results can be found at the Pacific Islands Athletics Statistics.

=== Men ===
Event	Gold		Silver		Bronze	
100 metres	Frederick Canon (NRU)	11.3	Jacky Okada (PLW)	11.3	Daniel Adachi (PLW)	11.4
200 metres	Frederick Canon (NRU)	23.7	Jacky Okada (PLW)	23.8	Tryson Duburiya (NRU)	24.1
400 metres	Martin Motuahala (MHL)	52.3	Cedric Frazier (NMI)	53.0	Clinton Ngiraked (NMI)	53.3
800 metres	Anthony Quan (GUM)	1:59.6 GR	(Pohnpei State) Elias Rodriguez (POH)	2:02.3	James Evangelista (GUM)	2:04.6
1500 metres	Anthony Quan (GUM)	4:17.7 GR	(Pohnpei State) Elias Rodriguez (POH)	4:20.4	James Evangelista (GUM)	4:23.0
5000 metres	(Pohnpei State) Elias Rodriguez (POH)	17:11.7 GR	Tim Brady (GUM)	17:23.2	Joe Taitano (GUM)	17:32.1
10000 metres	(Pohnpei State) Elias Rodriguez (POH)	35:46.1 GR	John Hoffman (NMI)	36:39.7	Joe Taitano (GUM)	36:41.0
Marathon	(Pohnpei State) Elias Rodriguez (POH)	2:55:54	Fred Schumann (GUM)	3:02:27	(Chuuk State) Soichi Koichi (CHU)	3:40:20?
High jump	Todd Surber (MHL)	1.72 =GR	Sngebard Delong (PLW)	1.68	Kerjoe Rechirei (PLW)	1.61
Long jump	Florenz Quitlong (GUM)	6.69 GR	Cedric Frazier (NMI)	6.11	(Kosrae) Luke Jerry (KOS)	6.10
Triple jump	Kerjoe Rechirei (PLW)	13.10w	David Wilson (GUM)	12.79w	Fred Rocio (GUM)	12.28w
Shot put	Rene Delamar (GUM)	12.94	Pelefoti Cooper (PLW)	12.32	Alan Remeliik (PLW)	12.25
Discus throw	Rene Delamar (GUM)	39.68 GR	Gerard Jones (NRU)	39.62	Pelefoti Cooper (PLW)	36.38
Javelin throw	Joal Untalan (NMI)	48.84	(Kosrae) Brightwell Skilling (KOS)	46.44	Fine Olsson (NRU)	46.36
4 x 100 metres relay	Marshall Islands; Laan Lorrance; Joe Usher; Martin Motuahala; Daniel Andrew	44.5	Northern Mariana Islands; Clinton Ngiraked; Wesley Inawo; Cedric Frazier; Tony Ichiou	44.7	Nauru; Ace Capelle; Frederick Canon; Tryson Duburiya; Michael Demapilis	44.8
4 x 400 metres relay	Guam; Florenz Quitlong; David Wilson; Anthony Quan; James Evangelista	3:30.6 GR	Northern Mariana Islands; Clinton Ngiraked; Wesley Inawo; Cedric Frazier; Tony Ichiou	3:34.3	Palau; Ricky Ngiraked; Sngebard Delong; Clyde Napolaon; Einer Kebekol	3:35.5

=== Women ===
Event	Gold		Silver		Bronze	
100 metres	(Pohnpei State) Rita Epina (POH)	13.4	Anelize Emiliano (PLW)	13.4	Theresa Sison (GUM)	13.4
200 metres	(Pohnpei State) Rita Epina (POH)	27.8 GR	Anelize Emiliano (PLW)	28.2?	Theresa Sison (GUM)	28.1?
400 metres	Theresa Sison (GUM)	62.9 GR	Shelly Jongman (NMI)	65.6	Trudy Duburiya (NRU)	65.9
800 metres	Marie Benito (GUM)	2:36.8 GR	Dannette Ricky (PLW)	2:37.6	Shelly Jongman (NMI)	2:42.5
1500 metres	Marie Benito (GUM)	5:19.3	Hyacinth Ignacio (NMI)	5:44.4	Amanda Barker (MHL)	5:46.1
3000 metres	Marie Benito (GUM)	12:13.9	(Chuuk State) Aniwika Sakan (CHU)	12:41.7	Bellee Ngiraibab (PLW)	12:43.5
10000 metres	Marie Benito (GUM)	44:51.6	Joanne Bonine (GUM)	45:17.0	Bernice Carbullido (GUM)	45:26.1
Marathon	Joanne Bonine (GUM)	3:38:27	Carol Lynn Pierce (NMI)	5:10:56		
High jump	Rica Chisato (NMI)	1.29	Nerlina Merep (PLW)	1.25	Julie Tokyo (NMI)	1.18
Long jump	Theresa Sison (GUM)	4.80 GR	Nerlina Merep (PLW)	4.54	Sato Shimamura (GUM)	4.50
Triple jump	Nerlina Merep (PLW)	9.33	Dancia Benavente (GUM)	9.11	Sato Shimamura (GUM)	9.01
Shot put	Emiliana Quitugua (NMI)	9.64 GR	Polly Omechelang (NMI)	8.36	Anelize Emiliano (PLW)	8.32
Discus throw	Polly Omechelang (NMI)	29.12 GR	Emiliana Quitugua (NMI)	25.76	Carol Hinkle (GUM)	25.34
Javelin throw	Anelize Emiliano (PLW)	32.98	Emiliana Quitugua (NMI)	31.88	Polly Omechelang (NMI)	27.58
4 x 100 metres relay	Palau; Anelize Emiliano; Nerlina Merep; A. Ngirkelau; Jolene Rafael	54.9	Guam; Dancia Benavente; Mio Shimamura; Sato Shimamura; Theresa Sison	55.3	Kosrae; Lelean Abraham; Margrate Wakuk; Justina Palik; Maureen Elley	55.8
4 x 400 metres relay	Palau; Dannette Ricky; Cherrie Ringang; Paola Soaladaob; Laura Mangham	4:33.8 GR	Northern Mariana Islands; Stacey Conliff; Shelly Jongman; Heidi Yelin; Hyacinth Ignacio	4:37.6	Guam; Dancia Benavente; Adele Pama; Sato Shimamura; Theresa Sison	4:40.6

== Medal table (unofficial) ==
* Host nation (Guam)

Rank	Nation	Gold	Silver	Bronze	Total
1	Guam (GUM)*	13	6	12	31
2	Palau (PLW)	5	9	7	21
3	Pohnpei	5	2	0	7
4	Northern Mariana Islands (NMI)	4	12	4	20
5	Marshall Islands (MHL)	3	0	1	4
6	Nauru (NRU)	2	1	4	7
7	Kosrae	0	1	2	3
8	Chuuk	0	1	1	2
Totals (8 entries)		32	32	31	95
