= Mariana Cress =

American-Marshallese sprinter

Personal information
- Nationality: Marshall Islands
- Born: 12 August 1998 (age 27) Minneapolis, Minnesota, USA
- Height: 1.58 m (5 ft 2 in)
- Weight: 52 kg (115 lb)

Sport
- Country: Marshall Islands
- Sport: Athletics
- Event(s): 100 m, 200 m

Achievements and titles
- Personal best(s): 100 m: 12.79 (2015); 200 m: 26.90 (2014)
Medal record
Women's Athletics
Representing Marshall Islands
Micronesian Games
Bronze medal – third place	2014 Pohnpei	100 m
Bronze medal – third place	2014 Pohnpei	200 m
Bronze medal – third place	2014 Pohnpei	4x100m relay

Mariana Cress (born August 12, 1998) is an American-Marshallese sprinter. She is the current holder of the Marshallese records for the 100 metres and 200 metres. She competed for the women's 100 metres in the 2016 Summer Olympics.

== International competitions ==
Year	Competition	Venue	Position	Event	Notes
2014	Micronesian Games	Pohnpei, Federated States of Micronesia	3rd	100 m	13.32
2014	Micronesian Games	Pohnpei, Federated States of Micronesia	3rd	200 m	26.99
2014	Micronesian Games	Pohnpei, Federated States of Micronesia	3rd	4 × 100 m relay	53.88
2016	Olympic Games	Rio de Janeiro, Brazil	18th (p)	100 m	13.20

== Personal Bests ==
Outdoor

Event	Time	Venue	Date
100 m	12.79 (NR)	Burnsville, United States	9 May 2015
200 m	26.90 (NR)	Pohnpei, Federated States of Micronesia	21 July 2014
