= Keitani Graham =

Micronesian wrestler (1980–2012)

Personal information
- Nationality: Federated States of Micronesia
- Born: February 1, 1980 Kealakekua, Hawaii, U.S.
- Died: December 6, 2012 (aged 32) Chuuk, F.S. Micronesia
- Height: 1.73 m (5 ft 8 in)
- Weight: 84 kg (185 lb)

Sport
- Country: Federated States of Micronesia
- Sport: Greco-Roman wrestling, Athletics
Medal record
Men's athletics
Representing Chuuk
Micronesian Games
Gold medal – first place	2002 Kolonia	Pentathlon
Gold medal – first place	2002 Kolonia	4x400 m relay
- Updated on 6 May 2013

Keitani Graham (February 1, 1980 — December 6, 2012) was a Micronesian Greco-Roman wrestler. He competed in the Greco-Roman 84 kg event at the 2012 Summer Olympics and was eliminated in the qualifications by Charles Betts.

Graham was born in Kealakekua, Hawaii and attended Punahou School in Honolulu and the College of the Holy Cross in Worcester, Massachusetts. After college, he taught at Princess Ruth Ke’elikōlani Middle School. He died in Chuuk at the age of 32 after suffering a heart attack.

== Achievements ==
Graham also competed successfully in combined events in track and field athletics.

Year	Competition	Venue	Position	Event	Notes
Representing Chuuk
2002	Micronesian Games	Kolonia, Pohnpei	1st	Pentathlon	2702 pts
2002	Micronesian Games	Kolonia, Pohnpei	1st	4x400 m relay	3:25.49 min GR
