= Maria Ikelap =

Micronesian sprinter

Personal information
- Nationality: Chuukeese
- Born: January 4, 1987 (age 39) Weno, Chuuk
- Height: 1.60 m (5 ft 3 in)
- Weight: 48 kg (106 lb)

Sport
- Country: Federated States of Micronesia
- Sport: Athletics
Medal record
Women's athletics
Representing Chuuk
Micronesian Games
Gold medal – first place	2006 Saipan	Cross country - team
Silver medal – second place	2006 Saipan	4x400 m relay
Bronze medal – third place	2006 Saipan	200 m
Bronze medal – third place	2006 Saipan	4x100 m relay
- Updated on 6 May 2013

Maria Epiph Ikelap (born January 4, 1987, in Weno Island, Chuuk) is a track and field sprint athlete who competes internationally for the Federated States of Micronesia.

Ikelap represented Federated States of Micronesia at the 2008 Summer Olympics in Beijing. She competed at the 100 metres sprint and placed eighth in her heat without advancing to the second round. She ran the distance in a time of 13.73 seconds.

== Achievements ==
Year	Competition	Venue	Position	Event	Notes
Representing Chuuk
2006	Micronesian Games	Saipan, Northern Mariana Islands	3rd	200 m	28.12 s
2006	Micronesian Games	Saipan, Northern Mariana Islands	3rd	4 × 100 m relay	54.27 s
2006	Micronesian Games	Saipan, Northern Mariana Islands	2nd	4 × 400 m relay	4:30.89 min
2006	Micronesian Games	Saipan, Northern Mariana Islands	1st	Cross country - Team	10 pts
Representing the Federated States of Micronesia
2006	World Junior Championships	Beijing, China	60th (h)	100m	13.94 (wind: +0.8 m/s)
