= Athletics at the 2002 Micronesian Games =

Athletics at the V Micronesian Games
- Dates: July 22–26
- Host city: Kolonia, Pohnpei (Pohnpei State)
- Venue: Pohnpei State Track and Field
- Level: Senior
- Events: 35 (19 men, 16 women)

Athletics competitions at the 2002 Micronesian Games were held at the Pohnpei State Track and Field in Kolonia, Pohnpei, between July 22–26, 2002.

A total of 35 events were contested, 19 by men and 16 by women.

== Medal summary ==
Medal winners and their results were published on the Athletics Weekly webpage courtesy of Tony Isaacs.

=== Men ===
Event	Gold		Silver		Bronze	
100 metres	(Chuuk State) John Howard (CHU)	10.88 GR	(Chuuk State) Jack Howard (CHU)	11.01	Christopher Adolf (PLW)	11.01
200 metres	(Chuuk State) John Howard (CHU)	22.15 GR	Roman Cress (MHL)	22.43	Christopher Adolf (PLW)	22.47
400 metres	(Chuuk State) Jack Howard (CHU)	50.22 GR	(Yap State) Richard Falan (YAP)	50.71	Russell Ward Roman (PLW)	51.04
800 metres	Neil Weare (GUM)	1:59.64	(Pohnpei State) Cornelio Ardos (POH)	2:01.95	Russell Ward Roman (PLW)	2:04.39
1500 metres	Neil Weare (GUM)	4:13.58 GR	(Pohnpei State) Salv Delos Santos (POH)	4:26.59	(Chuuk State) Arno Farek (CHU)	4:28.27
5000 metres	Neil Weare (GUM)	16:02.73 GR	Pablo Cercenia (GUM)	17:33.82	(Chuuk State) Cheroky Hartman (CHU)	18:09.24
10000 metres	Neil Weare (GUM)	42:28.95	(Chuuk State) Enrich Hauk (CHU)	42:34.84	(Yap State) Allen David (YAP)	42:36.06
Half Marathon	Neil Weare (GUM)	1:20:01	(Pohnpei State) Rendelius Germinaro (POH)	1:23:08	Pablo Cercenia (GUM)	1:26:57
110 metres hurdles	(Pohnpei State) Isaac Saimon (POH)	16.06 GR	(Pohnpei State) Erwin Alex (POH)	16.60	(Chuuk State) Ricky Shorey (CHU)	17.10
400 metres hurdles	(Pohnpei State) Ronny Ifamilik (POH)	57.36	Shane Ogumoro (NMI)	59.89	(Pohnpei State) Samuel Anson (POH)	61.40
High jump	Donovan Helvey (PLW)	1.71	(Yap State) Steven Chomyed (YAP)	1.68	(Yap State) Richard Falan (YAP)	1.60
Long jump	Christopher Adolf (PLW)	6.35	Taia Maerennang (KIR)	6.09	(Pohnpei State) Cornelio Ardos (POH)	6.05
Triple jump	McKnight McArthur (PLW)	12.78	Taia Maerennang (KIR)	12.62	(Yap State) Robert Goronfich (YAP)	12.50
Shot put	Rais Aho (MHL)	12.70	(Yap State) Ram Ramngen Sulog (YAP)	11.47	(Chuuk State) Ruken Inegaw (CHU)	10.94
Discus throw	(Yap State) Clayton Maluwelgiye (YAP)	35.66	Rais Aho (MHL)	32.83	Jersey Iyar (PLW)	31.22
Javelin throw	(Yap State) Clayton Maluwelgiye (YAP)	55.00	Jersey Iyar (PLW)	49.64	Christopher Kitalong (PLW)	48.03
Pentathlon	(Chuuk State) Keitani Graham (CHU)	2702	Christopher Kitalong (PLW)	2670	McKnight McArthur (PLW)	2651
4 x 100 metres relay	Chuuk	43.23	Palau	43.60	Pohnpei	44.31
4 x 400 metres relay	Chuuk; John Howard; Jack Howard; Keitani Graham; Peter Donis Rudolf	3:25.49 GR	Palau	3:27.56	Pohnpei	3:34.14

=== Women ===
Event	Gold		Silver		Bronze	
100 metres	Ngerak Florencio (PLW)	13.24	Imengel Louch (PLW)	13.34	(Chuuk State) Angie Nedelec (CHU)	13.35
200 metres	(Chuuk State) Angie Nedelec (CHU)	27.63	Ngerak Florencio (PLW)	27.65	Desiree Craggette (GUM)	27.81
400 metres	Ngerak Florencio (PLW)	64.94	(Pohnpei State) Vangie Mercado (POH)	65.61	(Chuuk State) Kiumy Kapier (CHU)	68.43
800 metres	(Chuuk State) Vanity Kouch (CHU)	2:36.76	Avon Grace Mazo (PLW)	2:37.92	Sharon Truce (PLW)	2:39.05
1500 metres	(Pohnpei State) Jaceleen Pluhs (POH)	5:26.15	(Pohnpei State) Atrian Ladore (POH)	5:36.07	(Chuuk State) Vanity Kouch (CHU)	5:46.79
3000 metres	(Pohnpei State) Atrian Ladore (POH)	11:52.84 GR	(Chuuk State) Corason Kanas (CHU)	12:19.04	(Chuuk State) Erne Jansou (CHU)	12:32.96
10000 metres	(Pohnpei State) Kamila Lainos (POH)	51:52.72	(Pohnpei State) Miuleen Pluhs (POH)	52:21.82	(Pohnpei State) Sylvia Minoske (POH)	55:14.32
100 metres hurdles	(Pohnpei State) Mihter Wendolin (POH)	21.47				
High jump	Barbara Gbewonyo (PLW)	1.41	Carrissa Dkar Subris (PLW)	1.41	Kimaia Dan Murdoch (KIR)	1.38
Long jump	(Chuuk State) Angie Nedelec (CHU)	4.82	Desiree Craggette (GUM)	4.66	(Pohnpei State) Mihter Wendolin (POH)	4.60
Shot put	(Yap State) Schola Fathaangin (YAP)	10.89 GR	Chandis Cooper (PLW)	10.85	Melanie Nestor (PLW)	10.16
Discus throw	Dolores Rangamar (NMI)	31.69 GR	(Yap State) Schola Fathaangin (YAP)	31.48	Vanessa Mobel (NMI)	30.00
Javelin throw	(Yap State) Schola Fathaangin (YAP)	35.98 GR	Vanessa Mobel (NMI)	33.50		
Pentathlon	Maleah Umerang Tengadik (PLW)	2112 GR	Jewel Mangham (PLW)	1974	Julie Tokyo (NMI)	1910
4 x 100 metres relay	Chuuk; Regina Shotaro; Twinsanne Sam; Kiumy Kapier; Angie Nedelec	52.23 GR	Pohnpei	55.82	Marshall Islands	59.28
4 x 400 metres relay	Palau	4:27.02	Chuuk	4:31.06	Pohnpei	4:36.32

== Medal table (unofficial) ==
* Host nation (Pohnpei)

Rank	Nation	Gold	Silver	Bronze	Total
1	Chuuk	10	4	8	22
2	Palau	8	10	9	27
3	Pohnpei*	6	8	7	21
4	Guam	5	2	2	9
5	Yap	4	4	3	11
6	Northern Mariana Islands	1	2	2	5
7	Marshall Islands	1	2	1	4
8	Kiribati	0	2	1	3
Totals (8 entries)		35	34	33	102
