= Jack Howard (sprinter) =

Micronesian athlete, sprinter

Personal information
- Nationality: Chuukeese
- Born: July 21, 1981 (age 44) Weno, Chuuk, Micronesia
- Height: 1.77 m (5 ft 10 in)
- Weight: 84 kg (185 lb)

Sport
- Country: Federated States of Micronesia
- Sport: Athletics
Medal record
Men's athletics
Representing Federated States of Micronesia
(South) Pacific Games
Bronze medal – third place	2003 Suva	4x100 m relay
(South) Pacific Mini Games
Bronze medal – third place	2005 Koror	4x100 m relay
Representing Chuuk
Micronesian Games
Gold medal – first place	2006 Saipan	100 m
Gold medal – first place	2006 Saipan	4x100 m relay
Gold medal – first place	2006 Saipan	4x400 m relay
Gold medal – first place	2002 Kolonia	400 m
Gold medal – first place	2002 Kolonia	4x400 m relay
Silver medal – second place	2006 Saipan	200 m
Silver medal – second place	2002 Kolonia	100 m
- Updated on 6 May 2013

Jack Howard (born July 21, 1981 in Weno, Chuuk Atoll) is a track and field sprint athlete who competes internationally for the Federated States of Micronesia.

Howard represented the Federated States of Micronesia at the 2008 Summer Olympics in Beijing. He competed at the 100 metres sprint and placed 7th in his heat without advancing to the second round. He ran the distance in a time of 11.03 seconds.

His brother John Howard competed at the 2012 Summer Olympics.

== Achievements ==
Year	Competition	Venue	Position	Event	Notes
Representing Chuuk
2002	Micronesian Games	Kolonia, Pohnpei	2nd	100 m	11.01 s
2002	Micronesian Games	Kolonia, Pohnpei	1st	400 m	50.22 s
2002	Micronesian Games	Kolonia, Pohnpei	1st	4 × 400 m relay	3:25.49 min
Representing Federated States of Micronesia
2003	South Pacific Games	Suva, Fiji	3rd	4 × 100 m relay	42.12 s
2005	South Pacific Mini Games	Koror, Palau	3rd	4 × 100 m relay	42.83 s
Representing Chuuk
2006	Micronesian Games	Saipan, Northern Mariana Islands	1st	100 m	11.12 s (wind: -0.3 m/s)
2006	Micronesian Games	Saipan, Northern Mariana Islands	2nd	200 m	22.73 s (wind: +0.0 m/s)
2006	Micronesian Games	Saipan, Northern Mariana Islands	1st	4 × 100 m relay	43.76 s
2006	Micronesian Games	Saipan, Northern Mariana Islands	1st	4 × 400 m relay	3:31.59 min
