= Roman Cress =

Marshallese sprinter

Personal information
- Full name: Roman William Cress
- Nationality: Marshall Islands
- Born: August 2, 1977 (age 48) Kaven, Maloelap Atoll

Sport
- Sport: Track and field
Medal record
Men's athletics
Representing Marshall Islands
(South) Pacific Games
Silver medal – second place	1999 Santa Rita	200 m
Micronesian Games
Gold medal – first place	2006 Saipan	200 m
Silver medal – second place	2010 Koror	100 m
Silver medal – second place	2010 Koror	200 m
Silver medal – second place	2002 Kolonia	200 m
Bronze medal – third place	2006 Saipan	100 m
Oceania Championships
Gold medal – first place	2011 Apia	200 m
Silver medal – second place	2011 Apia	100 m
- Updated on 6 May 2013

Roman William Cress (born August 2, 1977, in Kaven) is a track athlete from the Marshall Islands. He was born to an American father and Marshallese mother. Cress attended South High School and participated in Track as a student. He then attended MCTC, transferred to St. Thomas for his bachelor's degree and participated in Track as a student athlete.

Cress has won the bronze medal in the 100 metres sprint at the 2006 Micronesia Games and gold in the 200 metres event at the same Games. He was the first Marshallese track athlete in history to compete in the Olympic Games, representing his country at the 2008 Summer Olympics in Beijing. At the 100 metres he finished 8th in his heat in a time of 11.18 seconds He is currently a school administrator at Robbinsdale Middle School in Robbinsdale, Minnesota.

== Achievements ==
Year	Competition	Venue	Position	Event	Notes
Representing Marshall Islands
1999	South Pacific Games	Santa Rita, Guam	2nd	200 m	21.89 s
2002	Micronesian Games	Kolonia, Pohnpei	2nd	200 m	22.43 s
2006	Micronesian Games	Saipan, Northern Mariana Islands	3rd	100 m	11.19 s (wind: -0.3 m/s)
2006	Micronesian Games	Saipan, Northern Mariana Islands	1st	200 m	22.66 s (wind: +0.0 m/s)
2010	Micronesian Games	Koror, Palau	2nd	100 m	11.20 s
2010	Micronesian Games	Koror, Palau	2nd	200 m	23.15 s
2011	Oceania Championships (Regional Division West)	Apia, Samoa	2nd	100 m	11.10 s (wind: +0.7 m/s)
2011	Oceania Championships (Regional Division West)	Apia, Samoa	1st	200 m	22.54 s (wind: +0.8 m/s)

== See also ==
- Marshall Islands at the 2008 Summer Olympics
