= Wally Kirika =

Papua New Guinean sprinter

Personal information
- Nationality: Papua New Guinea
- Born: October 27, 1982 (age 43) Kainantu, Eastern Highlands

Sport
- Sport: Athletics
Medal record
Men's athletics
Representing Papua New Guinea
(South) Pacific Games
Gold medal – first place	2003 Suva	4x100 m relay
Bronze medal – third place	2007 Apia	100 m
(South) Pacific Mini Games
Gold medal – first place	2005 Koror	4x100 m relay
Gold medal – first place	2001 Middlegate	4x100 m relay
Bronze medal – third place	2005 Koror	100 m
Oceania Championships
Silver medal – second place	2006 Apia	100 m
Silver medal – second place	2006 Apia	4x100 m relay
- Updated on 28 April 2013

Wally Kirika (born October 27, 1982) is a sprinter from Kainantu, Papua New Guinea.

He began sprinting at Kainantu High School. As a junior athlete, he was one of four male sprinters selected by the Papua New Guinea Athletic Union to take part in the Melanesian Championships in Fiji in April 2001. He reached the second round in the 100m at the 2006 Commonwealth Games with a then-personal best of 10.76s. His time of 10.80s in the second round was the best of the three Pacific Islanders in the second round. His personal bests, both set in 2007, are 10.74s in the 100m and 22.01s in the 200m.

As of 2010 he was a winger with the Hornibrook NGI Harlequins rugby team.

== Achievements ==
Year	Competition	Venue	Position	Event	Notes
Representing Papua New Guinea
2001	South Pacific Mini Games	Middlegate, Norfolk Island	1st	4 × 100 m relay	42.04 s
2003	South Pacific Games	Suva, Fiji	1st	4 × 100 m relay	40.94 s
2005	South Pacific Mini Games	Koror, Palau	3rd	100 m	10.84 s (wind: +0.5 m/s)
2005	South Pacific Mini Games	Koror, Palau	1st	4 × 100 m relay	41.92 s
2006	Oceania Championships	Apia, Samoa	2nd	100 m	10.82 s (wind: -0.3 m/s)
2006	Oceania Championships	Apia, Samoa	2nd	4 × 100 m relay	42.01 s
2007	Pacific Games	Apia, Samoa	3rd	100 m	10.74 s (wind: +0.7 m/s)
