= John Howard (Micronesian sprinter) =

Sprinter from the Federated States of Micronesia

Personal information
- Nationality: Chuukeese
- Born: July 21, 1981 (age 45) Weno, Chuuk
- Height: 1.78 m (5 ft 10 in)
- Weight: 67 kg (148 lb)

Sport
- Country: Federated States of Micronesia
- Sport: Athletics
- Event: 100 metres
- Coached by: Marz Akapito and Carl Cruz
Medal record
Men's athletics
Representing Federated States of Micronesia
(South) Pacific Games
Bronze medal – third place	2003 Suva	200 m
Bronze medal – third place	2003 Suva	4x100 m relay
(South) Pacific Mini Games
Bronze medal – third place	2005 Koror	4x100 m relay
Men's athletics
Representing Chuuk
Micronesian Games
Gold medal – first place	2010 Koror	100 m
Gold medal – first place	2010 Koror	200 m
Gold medal – first place	2010 Koror	4x100 m relay
Gold medal – first place	2002 Kolonia	100 m
Gold medal – first place	2002 Kolonia	200 m
Gold medal – first place	2002 Kolonia	4x400 m relay
- Updated on 6 May 2013

John Howard (born July 21, 1981 in Weno) is a sprinter from the Federated States of Micronesia. He came 7th in Heat 6 of the 100 metres Preliminaries at the 2004 Summer Olympics and finished 5th in Heat 3 of the 100 metres Preliminaries at the 2012 Summer Olympics. His twin brother Jack Howard competed at the 2008 Summer Olympics.

== Achievements ==
Year	Competition	Venue	Position	Event	Notes
Representing Chuuk
2002	Micronesian Games	Kolonia, Pohnpei	1st	100 m	10.88 s
2002	Micronesian Games	Kolonia, Pohnpei	1st	200 m	22.15 s
2002	Micronesian Games	Kolonia, Pohnpei	1st	4 × 400 m relay	3:25.49 min
Representing Federated States of Micronesia
2003	South Pacific Games	Suva, Fiji	3rd	200 m	21.94 s (wind: -1.1 m/s)
2003	South Pacific Games	Suva, Fiji	3rd	4 × 100 m relay	42.12 s
2005	South Pacific Mini Games	Koror, Palau	3rd	4 × 100 m relay	42.83 s
Representing Chuuk
2010	Micronesian Games	Koror, Palau	1st	100 m	11.04 s
2010	Micronesian Games	Koror, Palau	1st	200 m	22.86 s
2010	Micronesian Games	Koror, Palau	1st	4 × 100 m relay	44.24 s
