= Mihter Wendolin =

Micronesian sprinter (born 1987)

Personal information
- Nationality: Pohnpei
- Born: February 3, 1987 (age 39) Pohnpei, Federated States of Micronesia
- Height: 1.63 m (5 ft 4 in)
- Weight: 54 kg (119 lb)

Sport
- Country: Federated States of Micronesia
- Sport: Athletics
Medal record
Women's athletics
Representing Pohnpei
Micronesian Games
Gold medal – first place	2010 Koror	Long jump
Gold medal – first place	2002 Kolonia	100 m hurdles
Silver medal – second place	2010 Koror	Triple jump
Silver medal – second place	2006 Saipan	4x100 m relay
Bronze medal – third place	2010 Koror	100 m
Bronze medal – third place	2010 Koror	4x400 m relay
Bronze medal – third place	2006 Saipan	100 m
Bronze medal – third place	2006 Saipan	400 m
Bronze medal – third place	2006 Saipan	4x400 m relay
Bronze medal – third place	2002 Kolonia	Long jump
- Updated on 6 May 2013

Mihter Wendolin (born February 3, 1987, in Pohnpei) is a Micronesian sprinter. She competed in the 100 metres competition at the 2012 Summer Olympics; she ran the preliminaries in 13.67 seconds, which did not qualify her for Round 1.

== Achievements ==
Year	Competition	Venue	Position	Event	Notes
Representing Pohnpei
2002	Micronesian Games	Kolonia, Pohnpei	1st	100 m hurdles	21.47 s
2002	Micronesian Games	Kolonia, Pohnpei	3rd	Long jump	4.60 m
2006	Micronesian Games	Saipan, Northern Mariana Islands	3rd	100 m	13.38 s
2006	Micronesian Games	Saipan, Northern Mariana Islands	3rd	400 m	66.26 s
2006	Micronesian Games	Saipan, Northern Mariana Islands	2nd	4 × 100 m relay	54.10 s
2006	Micronesian Games	Saipan, Northern Mariana Islands	3rd	4 × 400 m relay	4:38.31 min
2010	Micronesian Games	Koror, Palau	3rd	100 m	13.51 s
2010	Micronesian Games	Koror, Palau	1st	Long jump	4.55 m
2010	Micronesian Games	Koror, Palau	2nd	Triple jump	9.81 m
2010	Micronesian Games	Koror, Palau	3rd	4 × 400 m relay	4:31.86 min
