= Marshall Islands at the 2017 World Championships in Athletics =

- Flag of the Marshall Islands
- WA code: MHL
- National federation: Marshall Islands Athletics
- Website: Official website

in London, United Kingdom 4–13 August 2017
- Competitors: 1 (1 man) in 1 event
- Medals: Gold 0 Silver 0 Bronze 0 Total 0

World Championships in Athletics appearances
- 1991; 1993–1997; 1999; 2001–2007; 2009; 2011; 2013; 2015; 2017; 2019; 2022; 2023

The Marshall Islands competed at the 2017 World Championships in Athletics in London, United Kingdom, from 4–13 August 2017.

== Results ==
=== Men ===
Track and road events

Athlete	Event	Preliminary Round		Heat		Semifinal		Final	
Athlete	Event	Result	Rank	Result	Rank	Result	Rank	Result	Rank
Jeki Lanki	100 metres	11.91 PB	26	Did not advance					
