= Athletics at the 1990 Micronesian Games =

Athletics at the II Micronesian Games
- Dates: July
- Host city: San Antonio, Saipan, Northern Mariana Islands
- Level: Senior
- Events: 27 (14 men, 13 women)

Athletics competitions at the 1990 Micronesian Games were held in San Antonio, Saipan, Northern Mariana Islands, in July, 1990.

A total of 27 events were contested, 14 by men and 13 by women.

== Medal summary ==
Medal winners and their results were published on the Athletics Weekly webpage courtesy of Tony Isaacs.

=== Men ===
Event	Gold		Silver		Bronze	
100 metres	Daniel Adachi (PLW)	11.10 =GR	Tommy Worswick (PLW)	11.31	(Chuuk State) Charles Petrus (CHU)	11.50
200 metres	Daniel Adachi (PLW)	23.30 GR	(Chuuk State) Theodore Naka (CHU)	23.90	Jacky Okada (PLW)	23.97
400 metres	Richard Ngiraked (PLW)	52.34 GR	Ricky Ngiraked (PLW)	52.54	(Chuuk State) John Luther (CHU)	53.69
800 metres	(Pohnpei State) Elias Rodriguez (POH)	2:07.19 GR	Roy Avery (GUM)	2:07.49	Einer Kebekol (PLW)	2:08.01
1500 metres	(Pohnpei State) Elias Rodriguez (POH)	4:19.08 GR	Richard Madrekewet (PLW)	4:28.71	Einer Kebekol (PLW)	4:29.19
5000 metres	(Pohnpei State) Elias Rodriguez (POH)	17:18.51 GR	Yong Choi (NMI)	17:24.58	(Chuuk State) William Willy (CHU)	17:42.40
10000 metres	Yong Choi (NMI)	37:04.27 GR	(Pohnpei State) Elias Rodriguez (POH)	37:04.74	(Chuuk State) Estos Tisa (CHU)	38:19.40
Marathon	(Pohnpei State) Elias Rodriguez (POH)	2:52:29	Yong Choi (NMI)	2:55:31	(Chuuk State) Estos Tisa (CHU)	3:11:38
High jump	Tomiwo Suzuky (PLW)	1.65	(Pohnpei State) Edwin Charles (POH)	1.60	(Pohnpei State) Anthony Roby (POH)	1.50
Long jump	Kerjoe Rechirei (PLW)	6.18 GR	Rollins Jonathan (PLW)	5.83	Fred Rocio (GUM)	5.76
Shot put	Pelefoti Cooper (PLW)	13.16 GR	(Chuuk State) Rasko Sos (CHU)	11.20	(Chuuk State) Pat Kanas (CHU)	10.70
Discus throw	Pelefoti Cooper (PLW)	39.32 GR	Jeffrey Pua (NMI)	29.28	(Chuuk State) Frances Nabo (CHU)	28.88
4 x 100 metres relay	Palau	44.31 GR	Chuuk	45.24	Guam	47.05
4 x 400 metres relay	Palau	3:33.01 GR	Chuuk	3:42.34	Guam	3:49.06

=== Women ===
Event	Gold		Silver		Bronze	
100 metres	Anelize Emiliano (PLW)	13.20 GR	Sinta Ngirmeriil (PLW)	13.46	(Pohnpei State) Rita Epina (POH)	13.69
200 metres	Anelize Emiliano (PLW)	28.65 GR	Theresa Sison (GUM)	28.85	Anavelee Sakuma (PLW)	28.94
400 metres	Theresa Sison (GUM)	68.68 GR	(Chuuk State) Ania Joseph (CHU)	68.76	Kristina Wilson (GUM)	69.01
800 metres	Marie Benito (GUM)	2:37.90	Kristina Wilson (GUM)	2:47.44	Laura Mangham (PLW)	2:48.56
1500 metres	Marie Benito (GUM)	5:15.71	Kristina Wilson (GUM)	5:31.88	Miriam Ilemelong (PLW)	5:37.52
5000 metres	Marie Benito (GUM)	20:07.03	(Chuuk State) Movie Werner (CHU)	21:52.18	Miriam Ilemelong (PLW)	22:13.57
10000 metres	Marie Benito (GUM)	41:26.48	Lou Klitzki (GUM)	46:54.29	Margarite Abraham (PLW)	58:05.48
High jump	Ruth Ngirailab (PLW)	1.32 GR	Brenges Kloulubak (PLW)	1.19		
Long jump	Ruth Ngirailab (PLW)	4.25	Brenges Kloulubak (PLW)	3.81		
Shot put	Ruth Ngirailab (PLW)	7.24	Clarrisa Fejeran (NMI)	6.05		
Discus throw	Ruth Ngirailab (PLW)	27.54	Frances Santos (NMI)	22.37		
4 x 100 metres relay	Palau	53.52 GR	Pohnpei	57.08	Marshall Islands	57.80
4 x 400 metres relay	Chuuk	4:36.74	Palau	4:41.67	Pohnpei	5:23.74

== Medal table (unofficial) ==
* Host nation (Northern Mariana Islands)

Rank	Nation	Gold	Silver	Bronze	Total
1	Palau	16	8	8	32
2	Guam	5	5	4	14
3	Pohnpei	4	3	3	10
4	Chuuk	1	6	7	14
5	Northern Mariana Islands*	1	5	0	6
6	Marshall Islands	0	0	1	1
Totals (6 entries)		27	27	23	77
