= Athletics at the 2006 Micronesian Games =

Athletics at the VI Micronesian Games
- Dates: June 24 - July 1
- Host city: Susupe, Saipan, Northern Mariana Islands
- Venue: Oleai Sports Complex
- Level: Senior
- Events: 44 (22 men, 22 women)
- Participation: 8 nations

Athletics competitions at the 2006 Micronesian Games were held at the Oleai Sports Complex in Susupe, Saipan, Northern Mariana Islands, between June 24 - July 1, 2006.

A total of 44 events were contested, 22 by men and 22 by women.

== Medal summary ==
Medal winners and their results were published on the webpages of Athletics Weekly webpage courtesy of Tony Isaacs, and of the Oceania Athletics Association.

=== Men ===
Event	Gold		Silver		Bronze	
100 metres (wind: -0.3 m/s)	(Chuuk State) Jack Howard (CHU)	11.12	Tyrone Omar (NMI)	11.13	Roman Cress (MHL)	11.19
200 metres (wind: +0.0 m/s)	Roman Cress (MHL)	22.66	(Chuuk State) Jack Howard (CHU)	22.73	Ty Saiske (PLW)	23.46
400 metres	John Stills (PLW)	52.05	(Pohnpei State) Elterson Rodriguez (POH)	52.05	Toom Annaua (KIR)	52.32
800 metres	Derek Mandell (GUM)	2:03.76	(Pohnpei State) Keith Daniel Sepety (POH)	2:05.97	Toby Castro (GUM)	2:06.85
1500 metres	Derek Mandell (GUM)	4:11.92 GR	(Pohnpei State) Keith Daniel Sepety (POH)	4:26.22	Toby Castro (GUM)	4:27.04
5000 metres	Derek Mandell (GUM)	16:52.85	Brent Butler (GUM)	17:00.49	(Chuuk State) Kostantino Kosy (CHU)	17:39.88
10000 metres	Derek Mandell (GUM)	35:47.58	Brent Butler (GUM)	36:26.52	(Chuuk State) Kostantino Kosy (CHU)	37:15.61
Half Marathon	Brent Butler (GUM)	1:24:11	(Chuuk State) Kostantino Kosy (CHU)	1:26:09	(Chuuk State) Juda Ikelap (CHU)	1:28:55
110 metres hurdles (wind: NWI)	Kenneth Karosich (GUM)	16.45	Beteru Ateri (KIR)	17.12	Jahlil Fielder (GUM)	17.30
400 metres hurdles	Kenneth Karosich (GUM)	58.23	Moses Bismark (PLW)	61.01	(Chuuk State) Steve Mathias (CHU)	62.74
High jump	Beteru Ateri (KIR)	1.74	Buraieta Yeeting (KIR)	1.74	(Yap State) Nathan Nabachon (YAP)	1.71
Long jump	Buraieta Yeeting (KIR)	6.38 (wind: +0.0 m/s)	John Stills (PLW)	6.35 (wind: +0.0 m/s)	Michael Alicto (GUM)	6.20 (wind: +0.0 m/s)
Triple jump	Buraieta Yeeting (KIR)	13.39 (wind: +0.3 m/s) GR	(Chuuk State) Pernor Hartman (CHU)	12.20 (wind: +0.4 m/s)	Calson Dulei (PLW)	12.19 (wind: +0.0 m/s)
Shot put	Justin Andre (GUM)	13.34	Jersey Iyar (PLW)	12.63	Tiim Romatoa (KIR)	11.97
Discus throw	Justin Andre (GUM)	41.19 GR	Tiim Romatoa (KIR)	36.31	Melvin Tagabuel (NMI)	35.60
Hammer throw	Justin Andre (GUM)	51.29	Joseph Saures (NMI)	28.52	Galileo Saiske (PLW)	25.83
Javelin throw	Jersey Iyar (PLW)	52.27	Dougwin Franz (PLW)	49.44	Dallas Oketol (PLW)	49.31
Octathlon	Nick Mangham (PLW)	4298	Beteru Ateri (KIR)	3828	Leon Mengloi (KIR)	3640
4 x 100 metres relay	Chuuk; R.S. Sufon; Freeder Freddy; Evanston Nomau; Jack Howard	43.76	Pohnpei; Murphy Hairens; Jenson Wendolin; Jesse Hairens; Elterson Rodriguez	44.77	Northern Mariana Islands; Darrel Roligat; Tyrone Omar; Dexter Dillay; Benjamin Jones Jr	44.78
4 x 400 metres relay	Chuuk; Peter Donis Rudolf; Freeder Freddy; Steve Mathias; Jack Howard	3:31.59	Palau; Nicholas Mangham; John Stills; Christopher Kenty; Idip Tiobech	3:32.00	Pohnpei; Jenson Wendolin; Murphy Hairens; Jordan Ardos; Elterson Rodriguez	3:35.62
6km Cross Country - Individual	(Chuuk State) Juda Ikelap (CHU)	19:05	(Chuuk State) Michael Henry (CHU)	19:14	(Chuuk State) Ignore Sakate (CHU)	19:25
Cross Country - Team	Chuuk; Juda Ikelap; Michael Henry; Ignore Sakate	6	Northern Mariana Islands; Nathaniel Mateo; Yoshiharu Suzuki; Christopher Santos	18	Palau; Douglas Schmidt; Nicholas Mangham; John Stills	27

=== Women ===
Event	Gold		Silver		Bronze	
100 metres (wind: +0.0 m/s)	Ngerak Florencio (PLW)	12.97 GR	Cora Low (GUM)	13.10	(Pohnpei State) Mihter Wendolin (POH)	13.38
200 metres (wind: +0.0 m/s)	Ngerak Florencio (PLW)	26.76 GR	Paloma Swei (PLW)	27.76	(Chuuk State) Maria Ikelap (CHU)	28.12
400 metres	Ngerak Florencio (PLW)	62.91	Jacquelin Wonenberg (NMI)	64.03	(Pohnpei State) Mihter Wendolin (POH)	66.26
800 metres	Leana Peters (GUM)	2:29.90 GR	Nicole Layson (GUM)	2:31.11	(Chuuk State) Vanity Raynold (CHU)	2:36.75
1500 metres	Leana Peters (GUM)	5:01.50 GR	Noriko Jim-Nasuhara (NMI)	5:01.54	Nicole Layson (GUM)	5:13.58
5000 metres	Noriko Jim-Nasuhara (NMI)	19:24.18 GR	Leana Peters (GUM)	20:26.42	Nicole Layson (GUM)	20:29.42
10000 metres	Leana Peters (GUM)	48:36.88	Nicole Layson (GUM)	48:37.50	Morgan Avery (GUM)	48:52.57
Half Marathon	Akiko Hagiwara (NMI)	1:40:47				
100 metres hurdles (wind: NWI)	Cora Low (GUM)	16.49 GR	Kristen Mendiola (GUM)	17.40	Barbara Gbewonyo (PLW)	18.56
400 metres hurdles	Kimaia Dan Murdoch (KIR)	74.85	Barbara Gbewonyo (PLW)	77.86	Liamwar Rangamar (NMI)	80.67
High jump	Barbara Gbewonyo (PLW)	1.46	Kimaia Dan Murdoch (KIR)	1.43	Taina Yano (PLW)	1.34
Long jump	Cora Low (GUM)	4.66 w (wind: +3.0 m/s)	Barbara Gbewonyo (PLW)	4.61 (wind: +0.2 m/s)	Kimaia Dan Murdoch (KIR)	4.59 (wind: +1.3 m/s)
Triple jump	Barbara Gbewonyo (PLW)	9.89 (wind: +0.7 m/s) GR	Kimaia Dan Murdoch (KIR)	9.11 (wind: +0.4 m/s)	(Chuuk State) Kimenta Dobich (CHU)	9.10 (wind: +0.7 m/s)
Shot put	Chandis Cooper (PLW)	11.24 GR	(Yap State) Lucinda Kamloy (YAP)	9.32	Kimaia Dan Murdoch (KIR)	9.02
Discus throw	(Yap State) Javendra Lyn Lukreb (YAP)	28.26	Doris Rangamar (NMI)	28.21	Maleah Umerang Tengadik (PLW)	27.80
Hammer throw	Chandis Cooper (PLW)	25.21	Corrine Hideos (PLW)	23.24	Doris Rangamar (NMI)	22.18
Javelin throw	Maleah Umerang Tengadik (PLW)	34.69	Anelize Emiliano (PLW)	30.73	Kimaia Dan Murdoch (KIR)	30.50
Pentathlon	Kimaia Dan Murdoch (KIR)	2258 GR	Janyssa Ford (PLW)	1674	Wang Yue (NMI)	1616
4 x 100 metres relay	Palau; Ngerak Florencio; Anelize Emiliano; Paloma Swei; Peoria Koshiba	52.25	Pohnpei; Vangie Mercado; Amanda Wendolin; Marselihna Wendolin; Mihter Wendolin	54.10	Chuuk; Sam Twinsanne; Maria Ikelap; Aisina Finas; Kiumy Kapier	54.27
4 x 400 metres relay	Palau; Ngerak Florencio; Taina Yano; Paloma Swei; Peoria Koshiba	4:29.01	Chuuk; Aisina Finas; Maria Ikelap; Vanity Raynold; Stayleen Rimen	4:30.89	Pohnpei; Vangie Mercado; Lilihna Mihkel; Marselihna Wendolin; Mihter Wendolin	4:38.31
3km Cross Country - Individual	Noriko Jim-Nasuhara (NMI)	9:59	(Chuuk State) Vanity Raynold (CHU)	11:14	(Chuuk State) Stayleen Rimen (CHU)	11:19
Cross Country - Team	Chuuk; Vanity Raynold; Stayleen Rimen; Maria Ikelap	10	Northern Mariana Islands; Noriko Jim-Nasuhara; Jacque Wonenberg; Liamwar Rangamar	14	Palau; Peoria Koshiba; Paloma Swei; Barbara Gbewonyo	23

== Medal table (unofficial) ==
* Host nation (Palau)

Rank	Nation	Gold	Silver	Bronze	Total
1	Guam (GUM)	15	7	7	29
2	Palau (PLW)*	13	11	9	33
3	Chuuk	6	6	10	22
4	Kiribati (KIR)	5	6	6	17
5	Northern Mariana Islands (NMI)	3	7	5	15
6	Yap	1	1	1	3
7	Marshall Islands (MHL)	1	0	1	2
8	Pohnpei	0	5	4	9
Totals (8 entries)		44	43	43	130
