= Marshall Islands at the 2019 World Athletics Championships =

Marshall Islands at the 2019 World Championships in Athletics
- WA code: MHL

in Doha, Qatar
- Competitors: 1 (1 man) in 1 event
- Medals: Gold 0 Silver 0 Bronze 0 Total 0

World Championships in Athletics appearances
- 1991; 1993–1997; 1999; 2001–2007; 2009; 2011; 2013; 2015; 2017; 2019; 2022; 2023

Marshall Islands competed at the 2019 World Athletics Championships in Doha, Qatar from 27 September to 6 October 2019.

== Results ==
Key

- Note–Ranks given for track events are within the athlete's heat only
- Q = Qualified for the next round
- q = Qualified for the next round as a fastest loser or, in field events, by position without achieving the qualifying target
- NR = National record
- PB = Personal best
- N/A = Round not applicable for the event
- Bye = Athlete not required to compete in round

=== Men ===
Track and road events

Athlete	Event	Preliminary		Heat		Semifinal		Final	
Athlete	Event	Result	Rank	Result	Rank	Result	Rank	Result	Rank
Don Motellang	100 metres	11.89 PB	28	Did not advance					
