= Hadley Hesus =

Palauan politician

Member of the Kayangel State Legislature
- Incumbent
- Assumed office January 24, 2025

Hadley Hesus is a Palauan politician who has served as a member of the Kayangel State Legislature since January 2025. He was elected in a special election and was officially sworn in on January 24, 2025. He represents the at-large district.

He previously ran in the 2020 election for the same seat.
