= Athletics at the 2010 Micronesian Games =

Athletics at the VII Micronesian Games
- Dates: August 3–6
- Host city: Koror, Palau
- Venue: National Stadium
- Level: Senior
- Events: 36 (18 men, 18 women)
- Participation: 8 nations

Athletics competitions at the 2010 Micronesian Games were held at the National Stadium in Koror, Palau, between August 3–6, 2010.

A total of 36 events were contested, 18 by men and 18 by women.

== Medal summary ==
Medal winners and their results were published on the Oceania Athletics Association and on the Games' athletics webpage.

=== Men ===
Event	Gold		Silver		Bronze	
100 metres (wind: NWI)	(Chuuk State) John Howard (CHU)	11.04	Roman Cress (MHL)	11.20	Tyrone Omar (NMI)	11.32
200 metres (wind: NWI)	(Chuuk State) John Howard (CHU)	22.86	Roman Cress (MHL)	23.15	Rodman Teltull (PLW)	23.29
400 metres	Douglas Schmidt (PLW)	51.38	John Stills (PLW)	52.69	(Pohnpei State) McCaffrey Jason Gilmete (POH)	53.00
800 metres	Derek Mandell (GUM)	1:58.10 GR	Douglas Schmidt (PLW)	1:59.20	Michael Gaitan (GUM)	2:05.39
1500 metres	Derek Mandell (GUM)	4:16.87	Jeofry Limtiaco (GUM)	4:26.40	Toby Castro (GUM)	4:27.11
5000 metres	Michael Gaitan (GUM)	17:43.36	Toby Castro (GUM)	17:48.85	(Chuuk State) A.M. Sairen (CHU)	17:57.00
10km road race	Derek Mandell (GUM)	37:48.44	(Pohnpei State) Rendelius Germinaro (POH)	38:30.67	Toby Castro (GUM)	39:39.58
110 metres hurdles (wind: NWI)	Leon Mengloi (PLW)		Michael Herreros (GUM)		Clayton Kenty (NMI)	
400 metres hurdles	Jacques Stills (PLW)	60.96	Clayton Kenty (NMI)	61.58	Jeofry Limtiaco (GUM)	61.61
High jump	Leon Mengloi (PLW)	1.73m	John Stills (PLW)	1.65m	Mitchell Mamis (PLW)	1.65m
Long jump	Jonavin Ryan Ichihara (NMI)	5.82m (wind: NWI)	John Stills (PLW)	5.79m (wind: NWI)	Carson Jr. Olkeriil (PLW)	5.58m (wind: NWI)
Triple jump	Douglas Schmidt (PLW)	12.63m (wind: NWI)	(Chuuk State) Pernor Hartman (CHU)	11.99m (wind: NWI)	Albert Juan III (GUM)	11.95m (wind: NWI)
Shot put	Jersey Iyar (PLW)	12.05m	(Pohnpei State) Ron Etscheit (POH)	11.45m	(Yap State) Daniel Ramngen (YAP)	10.94m
Discus throw	(Pohnpei State) Clayton Maluwelgiye (POH)	38.15m	(Yap State) Edmund Faymau (YAP)	33.81m	Jersey Iyar (PLW)	33.80m
Javelin throw	Dougwin Franz (PLW)	60.86m GR	Nick Gross (NMI)	53.12m	Jersey Iyar (PLW)	50.89m
Octathlon	Leon Mengloi (PLW)	4475 pts GR	Christopher Kitalong (PLW)	3941 pts	Trevor Ogumoro (NMI)	2910 pts
4 x 100 metres relay	Chuuk; Yonder Namelo; Rusty Etipo; Yondan Namelo; John Howard	44.24	Palau; Leon Mengloi; Rodman Teltull; Rivers Reklai; John Stills	44.53	Pohnpei; Jeffrey Bonabard; Jesse Hairens; Jayson Ernest; Justine Rodgriguez	45.07
4 x 400 metres relay	Palau; Douglas Schmidt; John Stills; Francis Tkel; Rodman Teltull	3:31.76	Pohnpei; McCaffrey Jason Gilmete; Rico Joab; Jonathan Matthew Larudine; Pahnrasko Ardos	3:35.54	Guam; Derek Mandell; Michael Gaitan; Jeofry Limtiaco; Keith Muna	3:36.05

=== Women ===
Event	Gold		Silver		Bronze	
100 metres (wind: NWI)	Yvonne Bennett (NMI)	12.68 GR	Naomi Burke (GUM)	13.43	(Pohnpei State) Mihter Wendolin (POH)	13.51
200 metres (wind: NWI)	Yvonne Bennett (NMI)	26.41 GR	Naomi Blaz (GUM)	27.60	Naomi Burke (GUM)	27.88
400 metres	Yvonne Bennett (NMI)	61.30 GR	Haley Nemra (MHL)	62.15	Naomi Blaz (GUM)	64.34
800 metres	Haley Nemra (MHL)	2:27.40 GR	Amy Atkinson (GUM)	2:27.60	(Chuuk State) Merisen Cornelio (CHU)	2:42.68
1500 metres	Amy Atkinson (GUM)	5:09.66	Haley Nemra (MHL)	5:22.80	Nicole Layson (GUM)	5:30.05
5000 metres	Mamiko Oshima-Berger (NMI)	21:11.62	Nicole Layson (GUM)	21:17.82	Haley Nemra (MHL)	21:32.75
10km road race	Mamiko Oshima-Berger (NMI)	46:09.40	Nicole Layson (GUM)	47:21.29	Sheena Subido (GUM)	54:53.70
100 metres hurdles (wind: NWI)	Jacquelin Wonenberg (NMI)	18.23	Sorai Reklai (PLW)	19.23	Liamwar Rangamar (NMI)	19.79
400 metres hurdles	Jacquelin Wonenberg (NMI)	73.68 GR	Liamwar Rangamar (NMI)	74.28	Ruby Joy Gabriel (PLW)	76.91
High jump	Colleen Gibbons (PLW)	1.48m	Carissa Trolii (PLW)	1.40m	Jacquelin Wonenberg (NMI)	1.30m
Long jump	(Pohnpei State) Mihter Wendolin (POH)	4.55m (wind: NWI)	Jacquelin Wonenberg (NMI)	4.48m (wind: NWI)	Noreen Ericsson (GUM)	4.46m (wind: NWI)
Triple jump	Jacquelin Wonenberg (NMI)	10.10m (wind: NWI) GR	(Pohnpei State) Mihter Wendolin (POH)	9.81m (wind: NWI)	Naomi Blaz (GUM)	9.34m (wind: NWI)
Shot put	Chandis Cooper (PLW)	10.31m	Genie Gerardo (GUM)	9.68m	Jenequa Sullivan Benaven (NMI)	9.55m
Discus throw	Jenequa Sullivan Benaven (NMI)	31.34m	Maleah Tangadik (PLW)	31.20m	Genie Gerardo (GUM)	26.99m
Javelin throw	Maleah Tangadik (PLW)	35.92m	Jacquelin Wonenberg (NMI)	33.05m	Liamwar Rangamar (NMI)	32.82m
Pentathlon	Jacquelin Wonenberg (NMI)	2380 pts GR	Pellma Hesus (PLW)	2011 pts		
4 x 100 metres relay	Northern Mariana Islands; Reylynn Jones Sapong; Jacquelin Wonenberg; Yvette Bennett; Yvonne Bennett	52.96	Palau; Ruby Joy Gabriel; Sorai Reklai; Darlene Riungel; Sarabeth Ksano	54.56	Chuuk; Olifera Mailo; Aphtarsia Lodge; Darla Simina; Monserat Phillip	55.07
4 x 400 metres relay	Northern Mariana Islands; Jacquelin Wonenberg; Yvette Bennett; Liamwar Rangamar; Yvonne Bennett	4:24.94 GR	Guam; Naomi Blaz; Noreen Ericsson; Nicole Layson; Amy Atkinson	4:29.57	Pohnpei; Mihter Wendolin; Reloliza Saimon; Amanda Wendolin; Ashley Apiner	4:31.86

== Medal table (unofficial) ==
* Host nation (Palau)

Rank	Nation	Gold	Silver	Bronze	Total
1	Northern Mariana Islands	13	5	7	25
2	Palau*	12	11	6	29
3	Guam	5	10	13	28
4	Chuuk	3	1	3	7
5	Pohnpei	2	4	4	10
6	Marshall Islands	1	4	1	6
7	Yap	0	1	1	2
Totals (7 entries)		36	36	35	107
