= Marie Benito =

Guamanian long-distance runner

Personal information
- Nationality: Chamorro (Guam)
- Born: Marie Calvo; August 9, 1965 (age 61) Tamuning, Guam USA
- Relative: Jaron Anthony Benito Middleton (nephew) Mike Benito (husband)

Sport
- Sport: Long-distance running
- Event: Marathon

Marie Benito (born August 9, 1965) is a Guam long-distance runner. She competed in the women's marathon at the 1996 Summer Olympics.
