= Neil Weare =

Guamanian middle-distance runner

Personal information
- Nationality: Guam
- Born: 20 June 1980 (age 46)

Sport
- Sport: Middle-distance running
- Event: 1500 metres

Neil Weare (born 20 June 1980) is a Guam middle-distance runner. He competed in the men's 1500 metres at the 2004 Summer Olympics.
