= Elias Rodriguez (athlete) =

Micronesian athletics competitor

Personal information
- Born: 23 August 1964 (age 61) Pohnpei
- Height: 5 ft 4.5 in (1.64 m)
- Weight: 62 kg (137 lb)

Sport
- Country: Federated States of Micronesia
- Sport: Athletics
- Event: Men's Marathon

Achievements and titles
- Olympic finals: 2000 Summer Olympics
- Highest world ranking: 81
- Updated on 9 May 2017

Elias Rodriguez (born 23 August 1964 in Pohnpei) he is a retired athlete who competed internationally for the Federated States of Micronesia.

Rodriguez represented Federated States of Micronesia at the 2000 Summer Olympics in Sydney. He competed in the marathon where he finished 81st in a time of 3:09:14.

Rodriguez's training for the 2000 Olympic marathon included pre dawn long runs over hills on his home island of Pohnpei and speed work in the evenings following days working at a full-time job. Rodriquez's Olympic marathon experience was unique according to coach and training partner Jim Blair, "Elias may have been the only marathoner running that day whose training included a full day's work at a hardware store."

In a field of 100 Rodriquez finished 81st, ahead of 19 world-class runners who had dropped out.

As the last athlete to compete in the 2000 Sydney Olympics Rodriquez may have received its largest ovation as over 100,000 spectators cheered him on as they awaited the closing ceremonies and fireworks only moments after he crossed the finish line.

== Post-Olympic career ==
Rodriguez coached and mentored the Federated States of Micronesia's Olympic track and field athletes at the 2016 Summer Olympics held in Rio de Janeiro, Brazil.
