= Christopher Adolf =

Palauan sprinter (born 1976)

Christopher Silas Adolf (born April 16, 1976) is a retired track and field sprint athlete who competed internationally for Palau. He was born on 16 April, 1976. Adolf was part of the first ever team from Palau to compete at the Olympics when he was picked for the 2000 Summer Olympics in Sydney and his result was #8h r1/4 in 100 metres. He competed in the 100 metres, where he finished 8th in his heat so didn't advance to the next round.
