= Athletics at the 1969 Micronesian Games =

Athletics at the I Micronesian Games
- Dates: July
- Host city: San Antonio, Saipan, Northern Mariana Islands (Trust Territory of the Pacific Islands)
- Level: Senior
- Events: 24 (18 men, 6 women)
- Participation: 6 nations

Athletics competitions at the 1969 Micronesian Games were held in San Antonio, Saipan, Northern Mariana Islands, in July, 1969. Only athletes from those six Micronesian territories that constituted the U.S. administrated Trust Territory of the Pacific Islands were participating.

A total of 24 events were contested, 18 by men and 6 by women.

== Medal summary ==
Medal winners and their results were published on the Athletics Weekly webpage courtesy of Tony Isaacs.

=== Men ===
Event	Gold		Silver		Bronze	
100 metres	(Trust Territory of the Pacific Islands) Eliezer Sebalt (PLW)	11.1	(Trust Territory of the Pacific Islands) Tadasi Sakuma (PLW)	11.2	(Trust Territory of the Pacific Islands) Cabriel Walter (PLW)	11.3
200 metres	(Trust Territory of the Pacific Islands) Eliezer Sebalt (PLW)	23.5	(Trust Territory of the Pacific Islands) Cabriel Walter (PLW)	24.1	(Trust Territory of the Pacific Islands) Avin Chero (CHU)	24.4
400 metres	(Trust Territory of the Pacific Islands) Eliezer Sebalt (PLW)	53.8	(Trust Territory of the Pacific Islands) Cleofas Iyar (PLW)	55.0	(Trust Territory of the Pacific Islands) Karno Kumo (CHU)	57.1
800 metres	(Trust Territory of the Pacific Islands) Cleofas Iyar (PLW)	2:11.3	(Trust Territory of the Pacific Islands) Karno Kumo (CHU)	???	(Trust Territory of the Pacific Islands) Antonio Spencer (POH)	???
1500 metres	(Trust Territory of the Pacific Islands) Ishiro Hairens (POH)	4:40.9	(Trust Territory of the Pacific Islands) Alyko Peiso (POH)	4:44.3	(Trust Territory of the Pacific Islands) William Osima (PLW)	4:44.5
3000 metres	(Trust Territory of the Pacific Islands) Ishiro Hairens (POH)	10:33.3	(Trust Territory of the Pacific Islands) Elia Kual (PLW)	10:51.0	(Trust Territory of the Pacific Islands) Isidro Hairens (POH)	10:54.0
5000 metres	(Trust Territory of the Pacific Islands) Ishiro Hairens (POH)	18:18.8	(Trust Territory of the Pacific Islands) Silas Ngirabiang (PLW)	18:52.4	(Trust Territory of the Pacific Islands) Elia Kual (PLW)	18:56.5
10,000 metres	(Trust Territory of the Pacific Islands) Ishiro Hairens (POH)	39:38.8	(Trust Territory of the Pacific Islands) Alyko Peiso (POH)	39:44.1	(Trust Territory of the Pacific Islands) Elia Kual (PLW)	40:14.3
110 metres hurdles	(Trust Territory of the Pacific Islands) Dave Emil (PLW)	17.3	(Trust Territory of the Pacific Islands) Tony Towai (PLW)	17.6	(Trust Territory of the Pacific Islands) Mike Zakios (MHL)	18.4
High jump	(Trust Territory of the Pacific Islands) Henry Edwin (POH)	1.72	(Trust Territory of the Pacific Islands) Tony Towai (PLW)	1.72	(Trust Territory of the Pacific Islands) Yamada (YAP)	1.67
Pole vault	(Trust Territory of the Pacific Islands) Filomena Ngirabedul (PLW)	3.20	(Trust Territory of the Pacific Islands) Tony Towai (PLW)	3.05	(Trust Territory of the Pacific Islands) Nachimu Sourk (CHU)	2.89
Long jump	(Trust Territory of the Pacific Islands) Mike Zakios (MHL)	6.04	(Trust Territory of the Pacific Islands) William Ngiraikelau (PLW)	6.03	(Trust Territory of the Pacific Islands) Solomen Ruben (CHU)	5.89
Triple jump	(Trust Territory of the Pacific Islands) William Ngiraikelau (PLW)	13.33	(Trust Territory of the Pacific Islands) Paulus Kumangai (PLW)	12.75	(Trust Territory of the Pacific Islands) Simeon Wilson (POH)	12.42
Shot put	(Trust Territory of the Pacific Islands) Carwin Edwin (POH)	11.78	(Trust Territory of the Pacific Islands) Jess Pua (NMA)	10.72	(Trust Territory of the Pacific Islands) Oketang Ngirailab (PLW)	10.46
Discus throw	(Trust Territory of the Pacific Islands) Samuel Butelbai (PLW)	32.04	(Trust Territory of the Pacific Islands) Oketang Ngirailab (PLW)	30.38	(Trust Territory of the Pacific Islands) Carwin Edwin (POH)	30.18
Javelin throw	(Trust Territory of the Pacific Islands) Singeru Techur (PLW)	51.14	(Trust Territory of the Pacific Islands) Teofilus Joshua (PLW)	50.90	(Trust Territory of the Pacific Islands) Samuel Butelbai (PLW)	49.80
4 × 100 metres relay	(Trust Territory of the Pacific Islands) Palau	45.7	(Trust Territory of the Pacific Islands) Ponape	47.0	(Trust Territory of the Pacific Islands) Truk	47.8
4 × 400 metres relay	(Trust Territory of the Pacific Islands) Palau	3:39.7	(Trust Territory of the Pacific Islands) Ponape	3:55.0	(Trust Territory of the Pacific Islands) Truk	3:59.5

=== Women ===
Event	Gold		Silver		Bronze	
100 metres	(Trust Territory of the Pacific Islands) Clara Joshua (PLW)	13.5	(Trust Territory of the Pacific Islands) Atalia Chukon (CHU)	13.8	(Trust Territory of the Pacific Islands) Ines Iasuo (CHU)	13.9
200 metres	(Trust Territory of the Pacific Islands) Notune Albert (POH)	28.7	(Trust Territory of the Pacific Islands) Clara Joshua (PLW)	30.1	(Trust Territory of the Pacific Islands) Ines Iasuo (CHU)	30.3
400 metres	(Trust Territory of the Pacific Islands) Notune Albert (POH)	71.7	(Trust Territory of the Pacific Islands) Menros Amru (CHU)	72.2	(Trust Territory of the Pacific Islands) Royal Olter (POH)	75.9
High jump	(Trust Territory of the Pacific Islands) Julia Franz (PLW)	1.27	(Trust Territory of the Pacific Islands) Margarita Ngirakamerang (PLW)	1.24	(Trust Territory of the Pacific Islands) Kautiang Mikel (PLW)	1.24
Long jump	(Trust Territory of the Pacific Islands) Julia Franz (PLW)	4.39	(Trust Territory of the Pacific Islands) Clara Joshua (PLW)	4.31	(Trust Territory of the Pacific Islands) Maraka Kamien (CHU)	3.86
4 × 100 metres relay	(Trust Territory of the Pacific Islands) Truk	56.8	(Trust Territory of the Pacific Islands) Ponape	57.4	(Trust Territory of the Pacific Islands) Palau	57.6

== Medal table (unofficial) ==
* Host nation (Northern Mariana Islands)

Rank	Nation	Gold	Silver	Bronze	Total
1	(Trust Territory of the Pacific Islands) Palau	14	15	8	37
2	(Trust Territory of the Pacific Islands) Ponape	8	5	5	18
3	(Trust Territory of the Pacific Islands) Truk	1	3	9	13
4	(Trust Territory of the Pacific Islands) Marshall Islands	1	0	1	2
5	(Trust Territory of the Pacific Islands) Northern Mariana Islands*	0	1	0	1
6	(Trust Territory of the Pacific Islands) Yap	0	0	1	1
Totals (6 entries)		24	24	24	72

== Participation ==
Athletes from the following 6 territories were reported to participate:

- (Trust Territory of the Pacific Islands) Marshall Islands
- (Trust Territory of the Pacific Islands) Northern Mariana Islands
- (Trust Territory of the Pacific Islands) Palau
- (Trust Territory of the Pacific Islands) Ponape
- (Trust Territory of the Pacific Islands) Truk
- (Trust Territory of the Pacific Islands) Yap
