= Athletics at the Micronesian Games =

Athletics competitions have been held at the quadrennial Micronesian Games, that are open for the 10 member federations of the Micronesian Games Council, since the inaugural edition 1969 in Saipan, then Trust Territory of the Pacific Islands (now Northern Mariana Islands).

== Editions ==
Some host cities were extracted from national record lists of Micronesian Games Council members.

Games	Year	Host city	Country	Events	
Games	Year	Host city	Country	Men	Women
I	1969	San Antonio, Saipan	Trust Territory of the Pacific Islands	18	6
II	1990	San Antonio, Saipan	Northern Mariana Islands	14	13
III	1994	Mangilao	Guam	16	16
IV	1998	Koror	Palau	16	16
V	2002	Kolonia	Pohnpei	19	16
VI	2006	Susupe, Saipan	Northern Mariana Islands	22	22
VII	2010	Koror	Palau	18	18
VIII	2014	Kolonia	Pohnpei	19	19
IX	2018	Yap	Federated States of Micronesia	19	18
X	2024	Majuro			

== Medals ==
Medal winners for the athletics events of the Micronesian Games until 2006 were published courtesy of Tony Isaacs.

== See also ==
- List of Micronesian Games records in athletics
