= Cloncurry–Dajarra Road =

Road in Queensland, Australia

Cloncurry–Dajarra Road Queensland

General information
- Type: Rural road
- Length: 169 km (105 mi)
- Route number(s): no shield

Major junctions
- North-east end: Barkly Highway Cloncurry
- Malbon–Selwyn Road; Chatham Phosphate Road; Mount Isa–Duchess Road
- South-west end: Diamantina Developmental Road Dajarra

Location(s)
- Major settlements: Malbon, Duchess

Cloncurry–Dajarra Road is a 169-kilometre (105 mi) long road route between the towns of Cloncurry and Dajarra in the Shire of Cloncurry in Queensland, Australia. It is a state-controlled district road (number 7708) rated as a local road of regional significance (LRRS). It is a north-east to south-west link between the Barkly Highway and the Diamantina Developmental Road, servicing a number of cattle grazing and production areas in northern Queensland.

== Route description ==
Cloncurry–Dajarra Road commences at an intersection with the Barkly Highway in Cloncurry, about 11 kilometres (6.8 mi) west of the town. Starting as Cloncurry–Duchess Road it runs south until it approaches the railway line, where it turns south-west to parallel the line. At the southern boundary of the locality it crosses the line and enters Kuridala. Ballara Nature Refuge occupies much of Kuridala. The road and the railway line each follow separate corridors through the nature refuge in a north–south direction.

Nearing the southern extent of the nature refuge the road crosses the line on two occasions, before and after the side road to Malbon village. It then turns south-west, still loosely following the railway line, until it approaches the south-west corner of Kuridala. Here it turns west, crossing the Burke River and a branch railway line before turning south-west then sharply north-west at an intersection with Chatsworth Phosphate Road, and entering Duchess.

The road continues west to the town of Duchess where it crosses the railway line, turns south-west, and re-crosses the line, which then turns north-west towards Mount Isa. It then turns west until it reaches an intersection with Mount Isa–Duchess Road, (Note: A small section of Mount Isa-Duchess Road, within Mount Isa City, is a state-controlled district road (number 7709) rated as a local road of strategic significance (LRRS).) where it turns south-west as Dajarra–Duchess Road. From here the road continues south-west and then west before crossing the Dajarra boundary and again turning south-west. It continues south-west until it meets the Diamantina Developmental Road (here known as Boulia–Mount Isa Highway) 0.7 kilometres (0.43 mi) south-east of the town of Dajarra, where it ends.

Land use along this road is a mixture of stock grazing on native vegetation, nature refuge and railway operations.

== Road condition ==
Much of the road remains unsealed, but approximately 4.5 kilometres (2.8 mi) was sealed in 2018 under a $3.2 million project funded by the Northern Australia Beef Roads Program.

In November 2021 funding of $31.5 million under various programs was announced for this road, with an expected completion date of early 2022.

== History ==
Copper was discovered in the Cloncurry area in 1867, and the town was established to service the Great Australia Mine to the south. Fort Constantine was the first pastoral run in the district. Gold was discovered nearby, at Top Camp. The town was surveyed in 1876 and proclaimed in 1884. The railway arrived in 1907. It is likely that several other pastoral runs were established in the district.

Copper was discovered at Kuridala in 1884 and the Hampden mine commenced operations in the 1890s. The discovery was on a pastoral lease named Eureka. Copper mining in Kuridala led to the establishment of two new towns, Ballara and Kuridala, both now abandoned.

Copper was discovered in Duchess in 1897 on a pastoral run, which led to the opening of a mine and the founding of the town. The railway arrived in 1912. The town of Duchess is surrounded by cattle stations, including Stradbroke and Bushy Park.

The railway branch line arrived in the small settlement of Dajarra in 1917, and the town grew around it. There were already many pastoral runs in the surrounding area and further west, and the primary purpose of the railway was the transport of live beef cattle to markets in the east of the state. Dajarra railway station was reputed to be one of the busiest cattle transfer sites in the world.

Prior to construction of the railway, it is likely that early roads were cut from both Cloncurry and Dajarra to provide access for wheeled vehicles to the pastoral runs and mining settlements. Over time these tracks may have been improved and extended to eventually form a through road.

== Modern usage ==
Although not yet fully sealed the road is used extensively by road trains carrying cattle, and by other large trucks conveying heavy goods.

== Major intersections ==
All distances are from Google Maps. The entire road is in the Cloncurry local government area.

Location	km	mi	Destinations	Notes
Cloncurry	0	0.0	Barkly Highway – east – Julia Creek, Mckinlay – west – Mount Isa	North-eastern end of Cloncurry–Dajarra Road. Local name is Cloncurry–Duchess Road.
Kuridala	45.3	28.1	Malbon–Selwyn Road – east – Malbon, Selwyn	
Kuridala	101	63	Chatham Phosphate Road – south – The Monument	
Duchess	118	73	Mount Isa–Duchess Road – north-west – Mount Isa	Name changes to Dajarra–Duchess Road.
Dajarra	169	105	Diamantina Developmental Road (Boulia–Mount Isa Highway) - south - Boulia – west – Mount Isa	South-western end of Cloncurry–Dajarra Road
1.000 mi = 1.609 km; 1.000 km = 0.621 mi: Route transition
