= Wee MacGregor railway =

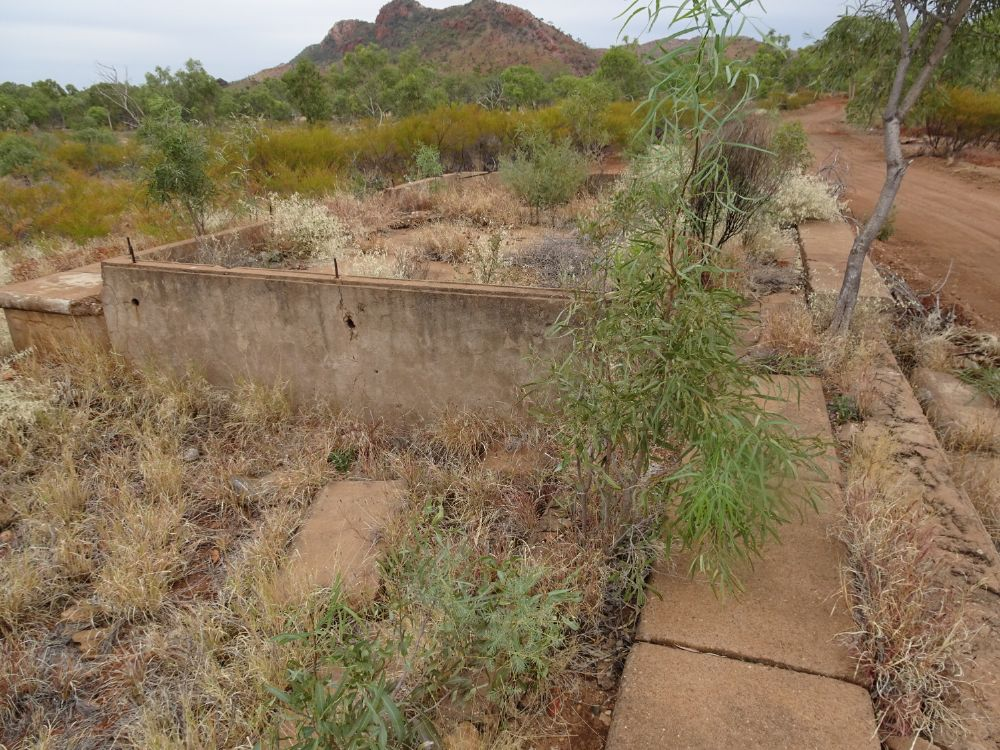
- Former freight platform, Ballara, 2018

- Location within Queensland
- 20.9252°S 139.9491°E
- Location: Kuridala, Shire of Cloncurry, Queensland, Australia

History
- Design period: 1900-1914 Early 20th century
- Built: 1909–1926

Queensland Heritage Register
- Official name: Wee MacGregor tram and rail complex and the former towns of Ballara and Hightville
- Type: state heritage
- Designated: 1 March 2019
- Reference no.: 650084
- Type: Mining and mineral processing: Mining camp/settlement; Transport-rail: Railway culvert; Transport-rail: Railway embankment/formation/cutting; Transport-rail: Railway platform; Transport-rail: Tramway; Transport-rail: Bridge-railway; Transport-rail: Rail tunnel
- Theme: Exploiting, utilising and transforming the land: Exploiting natural resources; Moving goods, people and information: Using rail; Building settlements, towns, cities and dwellings: Establishing settlements and towns

Wee MacGregor railway is a heritage-listed tramway and railway associated with the former towns of Ballara and Hightville in the locality of Kuridala, Shire of Cloncurry, Queensland, Australia. It was built from 1909 to 1926. It was added to the Queensland Heritage Register on 1 March 2019.

== History ==
The Wee MacGregor tram and rail complex and the former towns of Ballara and Hightville are located in the Argylla Ranges between Cloncurry and Mount Isa in North West Queensland, in the traditional country of the Kalkadoon people. Constructed during an early 20th century boom in copper prices, the now-abandoned mining towns of Hightville and Ballara were surveyed in 1913 and 1914 respectively. The former western terminus (near Ballara) of a private 3-foot-6-inch (1.07 m) narrow gauge railway line was constructed 1913–14 and a private 2-foot (0.61 m) gauge tramway, was constructed 1914–15 between Ballara and the Wee MacGregor mine. The complex includes a 48-metre (157 ft) long ore transfer stage (c. 1914), and a 77-metre (253 ft) long tunnel (1914–15).

The town of Cloncurry was surveyed in the 1870s to support the local mining and pastoral industries. Pastoralist Ernest Henry had discovered copper nearby in 1867 and established the "Great Australia" (or Great Australian) mine. Part of the area was proclaimed a goldfield in 1874, and the Cloncurry Mining District (later the Cloncurry Gold and Mineral Field) was proclaimed in 1883. In 1885 Cloncurry was described as "A copper-mining centre and township on the River Cloncurry", with a population of 754. The Cloncurry Mineral Field was proclaimed in 1905, and the Cloncurry Gold and Mineral Field in January 1913. Copper was discovered south of Cloncurry in 1884, and a town was formed in 1898 called Hampden (later called Kuridala, now heritage-listed as the Kuridala Township site). At Mount Elliot, south of Hampden, copper was discovered in 1899 and mining commenced in 1906 at the Mount Elliott Mining Complex.

The absence of a railway initially hampered the effective exploitation of Cloncurry's mineral resources. The closure of the Great Australia mine in 1887 meant a proposed railway from Normanton was diverted to Croydon as the Gulflander (1888–91), but when copper prices rose in 1905 the Queensland Government decided to extend the Great Northern Railway west from Richmond, and the first construction train reached Cloncurry in December 1907. In 1906–07 copper averaged £87 a ton on the London market, the highest price for 30 years.

Mining activity was increasing on the Cloncurry field even before the railway arrived. By March 1906, copper had been discovered as an outcrop at the Wee MacGregor lease, west-southwest of Cloncurry. The MacGregor ore body was discovered by Jack White in 1904 and James Peberdy, from Victoria, purchased seven leases in 1905, and later created the MacGregor Cloncurry Copper Mines Company. The Leichhardt Development Syndicate was formed in October 1906 to develop the Wee MacGregor "group" of mines, which included the Wee MacGregor, Grand Central, Wattle, and Wallaroo leases, and two months later MacGregor Cloncurry Copper Mines (the MacGregor Company) was floated in London. Hampden Cloncurry Copper Mines Ltd, and Mount Elliot Limited, two companies which later dominated the Cloncurry field during World War I (WWI), were also floated in 1906. In November 1906 tenders were called to sink 100 ft (30m) shafts on the Wee MacGregor, Wallaroo, and Grand Central leases.

A survey plan from January 1907 shows two shafts on the Wee MacGregor lease, and one shaft on the Wallaroo lease. By October 1907 there were three prospecting shafts on the Wee MacGregor lease. That year, with a population of 650 miners (almost double that of 1906), the Cloncurry field produced 5.6% of Queensland's copper. The Great Australia mine also reopened in 1907 (Jane Lennon & Associates, and H Pearce, Mining Heritage Places Study, p.xxvi). By July 1908 the MacGregor Company was employing 70 men, not including mine officials, and during 1908 a telephone link with Cloncurry was established and tenders were called for a mail service.

By 1909 a settlement, including company offices and a store, was developing near the Wallaroo mine, located about 1 km southeast of the Wee MacGregor mine. That year John Frost constructed the MacGregor Hotel on the site of Hightville. The hotel was listed under "Hightville" in Wise's Post Office Directory of 1911, although the town of Hightville was not surveyed until November 1913. In early 1909, the main camp for the Wee MacGregor mine was at the Wallaroo mine. The offices and store at the camp were lit by acetylene gas. Edith Edwards was the licensed victualler at the MacGregor Hotel, and from 1912 to 1920, Pierce Edwards is at the MacGregor Hotel. Hightville was surveyed into quarter acre (0.1ha) blocks in November 1913. The MacGregor Hotel is shown adjacent to the road on a 3-acre block within the town.

Isolation threatened the economic viability of the Wee MacGregor group of mines. Ore was first drayed to Cloncurry along a rough road in May 1909, but this form of transport was uneconomic. One option for the MacGregor Company was to build a private mining railway, as had been done elsewhere in Queensland, e.g. the Chillagoe railway (built 1898–1901), the Mount Garnet railway (1901–02), and the Etheridge railway (1907–10), which were all 3 ft 6in gauge, as well as 2 ft tramways from Boonmoo to Stannary Hills (1901–02), and Stannary Hills to Irvinebank (1906–07). Such railways were part of a wider pattern in Queensland during the late 19th-early 20th century: the construction of private and local government railways and tramways to transport the products of mining, as well as timber and agricultural produce. However, the MacGregor Company could not afford a private railway to "Marabah" (Marraba), the closest point on the Mount Elliott railway, 39 kilometres (24 mi) away.

Another option was for the company to contribute towards a state-owned railway, as had occurred with the railway from Cloncurry to Mount Elliott, via Hampden. The cost of this railway, which opened in 1910, was split 50/50 between the Kidston Government and The Mount Elliott Company. The railway ran from Cloncurry via Malbon and Hampden to the town of Selwyn (next to the Mount Elliott mine), 72 miles from Cloncurry. In September 1910 the MacGregor Company proposed a branch line from Malbon, on the Mount Elliott railway, under similar terms, and the government agreed to split the cost of a line survey and plans.

In June 1911 the MacGregor Company sought government support for a shorter branch line, this time linking to the state railway being built southwest from Malbon towards Sulieman Creek. Government officials were sceptical about the profitability and lifespan of the Wee MacGregor group of mines, despite the company estimating reserves of 100,000 tons of ore (most from the Wee MacGregor mine). Instead of a 50–50 funding arrangement for a state owned branch line, the government agreed to rent the MacGregor Company the rails they needed to construct a private line. By January 1912, a network of railways was spreading out from Cloncurry to the surrounding copper mines: the Mount Elliott Railway served the Hampden and Mount Elliott mines to the south of Cloncurry. The railway to Sulieman Creek was designed to link up with "Great Western Railway", a line from Bourke, New South Wales, to Darwin, Northern Territory, which was never built. The Duchess mines, southwest of Cloncurry, were to be served by the Malbon to Sulieman Creek Railway, while a Cloncurry to Mount Cuthbert Railway was planned to the northwest of Cloncurry and the MacGregor line would serve mines west-southwest of Cloncurry.

Queensland's Railways Commissioner, Charles Evans, inspected the proposed route to the Wee MacGregor mine in July 1912, and the Railway Department's Engineer, Percy Ainscow, proposed a "no-frills" railway, with a 10-foot (3.0 m) wide formation, reduced earthworks, less side drainage, cheap concrete culverts and the minimum of bridges.

The company's branch line was proposed at an opportune time. In 1912, the Cloncurry field produced 45% of Queensland's annual production of copper, with annual copper earnings now exceeding gold's earnings. There were 1485 copper miners on the field, which was the "foremost producer of copper in the State". By July 1912, 7000 tons of ore were sitting on the surface at the Wee MacGregor mine, awaiting transport, along with 1200 tons from other mines.

The Wee MacGregor Tramway Agreement Bill was introduced to Queensland Parliament in November 1912. The legislation's title uses the term "tramway" possibly because the railway was built on a "tramway" mining lease, granted under The Mining Acts, 1898–1910. The legislation proposed that the MacGregor Company pay for the construction and maintenance of a private 3-foot-6-inch (1.07 m) "tramway" (actually a narrow gauge railway), 24 miles 40 chains (39.4 km) long, from the Malbon to Sulieman Creek Railway to a terminus at or near the Wee MacGregor mine. The Commissioner for Railways would provide steel rails, fish plates, fastenings, sleepers and other permanent way materials. The company would pay 5% per year "rent" on the cost of the materials supplied by the government, which had the power to acquire the line. By 2 December 1912, the company involved in the proposal had become the Hampden Company, which purchased the Wee MacGregor group of mines from the Macgregor Company for £108,750. The purchase cost was paid in two instalments of £54,375, and the second instalment was paid on 10 June 1913.

Despite the Labor Party's concern about a company gaining a competitive advantage from a private railway line, The Wee MacGregor Tramway Agreement Act 1912 was passed on 4 December 1912. Walter Paget, Minister for Railways, noted the difference from previous private sector-government railway agreements, with less government exposure to risk. Instead of half the estimated £92,000 cost of the railway, the government would only invest £27,000 in materials, and would not be liable for any operating losses. The government also included a provision that the company could only charge 25% above government transport rates, rather than the usual 50%.

Work started on the 3-foot-6-inch (1.07 m) railway in early 1913, supervised by Ainscow. MacGregor Junction (Devoncourt), on the Malbon to Sulieman Creek railway, was the location of the main construction camp. The steepest grade for the railway was 1 in 40, with a minimum curve radius of 5 chains (330 ft; 100 m). By April 1913 about 200 men were employed on the project. By April 1913, all formation works and cuttings were finished to the Malbon River, 5 miles (8 km) northwest of MacGregor Junction, which by then had a telegraph office, a general store, slaughter yards, butcher and baker.

The railway was planned as far as the Wallaroo mine, located east of the town of Hightville, but in late 1913 the Hampden Company decided that, due to the steep, difficult terrain near Hightville, the railway would be shortened, with the terminus now 22 miles 49 chains (36.4 km) from MacGregor Junction. The remainder of the route to Hightville, and beyond to the Wee MacGregor mine, would now be traversed by a 2-foot (0.61 m) gauge tramway, which could accommodate tighter curves and steeper grades than the railway. The 3 ft 6in line's route from MacGregor Junction initially headed northwest, crossed the Malbon River near both the 5 and 10 mile (8 km and 16 km) marks, and then travelled south of the river, past the Pindora siding near the 14 mile (22.5 km) mark, before crossing the Malbon River again near the 15 mile (24 km) mark. It then headed north along the east side of Jimmy's Creek, before turning west and heading along the north side of Jimmy's Creek to Ballara.

A railway station and goods shed were constructed on the northern side of the town of Ballara, where a triangular junction was located. Ballara, situated at "Lady Lease Flats", was surveyed in June 1914. A sale of town lots was scheduled for 14 August 1914, with upset prices for the 1/4-acre (0.10 ha) lots ranging from £10 to £30. The outbreak of WWI led to the sale's cancellation, and by the time a sale of 36 lots was held on 24 February 1915, prices had trebled. Ballara was originally called "Mineral" and the latter name continued in use for some time after the Town of Ballara was surveyed. Facilities at Ballara included a post office, established in late 1914, and a police reserve was gazetted at the west end of the town in 1915. A district hospital was established by August 1918, on 5 acres (2.0 ha) north of the turning triangle. The Ballara Hotel existed by 1918, although it burnt down on 27 April 1918, and again in April 1919. A state school was approved in May 1919, and opened in July 1919. A cemetery reserve was also gazetted, northeast of the hospital reserve, replacing the previous cemetery south of Hightville.

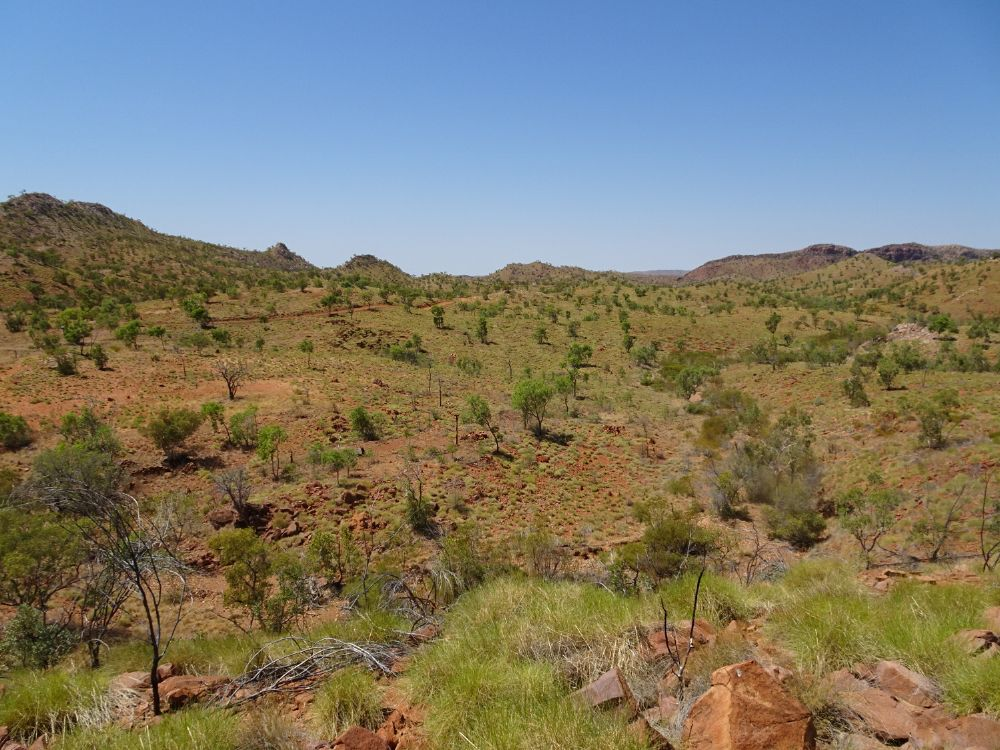
View over the site of Hightville, from NW, 2018

Hightville slowly declined after the 1913 decision to shorten the railway and relocate its terminus to Ballara, although a sale of 45 town lots still occurred in May 1914, with prices for a 1/4 acre (0.10 ha) ranging from £5 to £25. As well as the Macgregor Hotel, Hightville had a butcher by 1913; a storekeeper and postmaster by 1914; and a boarding house by 1915. A state school was also approved in May 1917, and sites were reserved for the school and police in 1918. By 1917, however, Hightville listings were included under "Ballara" in Wise's Post Office Directory. When the MacGregor Hotel burnt down in 1914, its replacement, the former Cosmopolitan Hotel from Ravenswood, was moved to Hightville, and later to Ballara. The school and its pupils moved to Ballara in 1919. Before the Hightville school moved to Ballara, pupils from Ballara caught the 2 ft tramway's locomotive to school in Hightville.

The 2-foot (0.61 m) tramway ran west from the triangular junction at Ballara, over a raised concrete ore transfer stage, past the terminus of the railway, and then curved north. It passed between Hightville and the Wallaroo mine, and proceeded to the Wee MacGregor mine - a total route of about 3.8 miles (6.1 km). A short branch tramway ran to the Wallaroo mine. Ore was transported via the tramway from the mines to the ore transfer stage, where it would be tipped from trucks on the tramway down into trucks on the railway. The railway would then convey the ore to the Hampden smelters (operational 1911). As the tramway was not part of the 1912 agreement, the company funded construction and purchased its 28-pound (13 kg) rails and steel sleepers.

By 5 May 1914 all earthworks, bridges, drains and rails for the railway were completed to the terminal yard at Ballara, although the station building and earthworks beyond the station weren't finished. The railway was operational during May 1914 and was officially opened to the public in July 1914, yet it was of little use for moving ore until the tramway was completed. The Hampden Company had spent £67,000, well under budget.

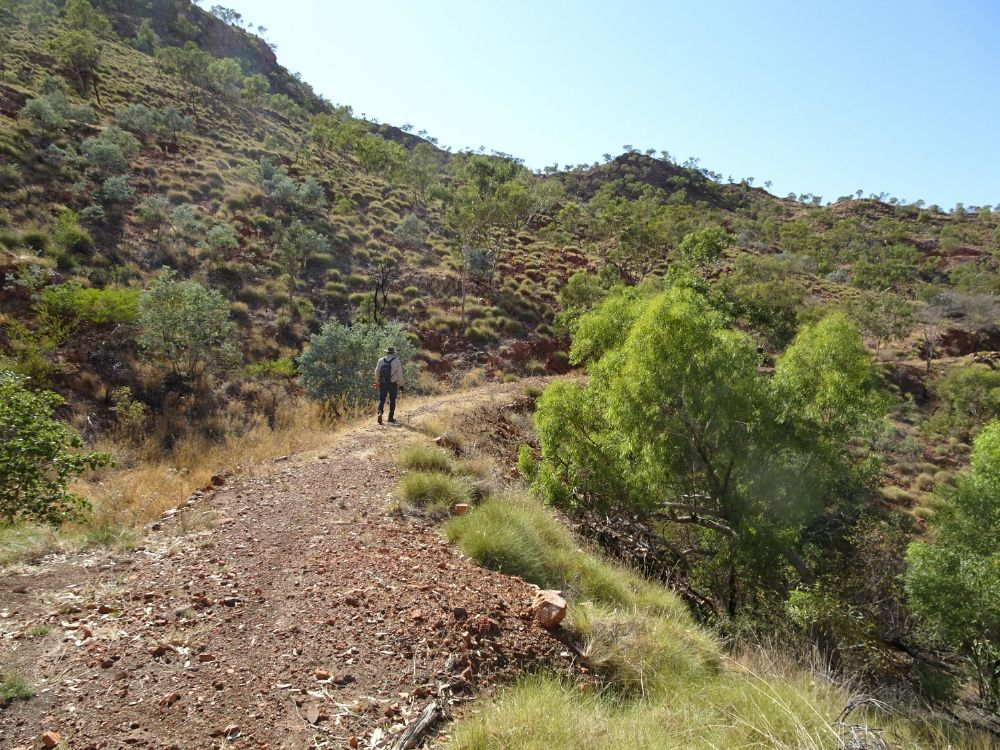
Tramway embankment north-east of the mine, 2018

The tramway was under construction in early 1914, with earthworks extending for 2 miles (3.2 km), and the "first five bridges and drains" nearing completion, by 5 May 1914. Between Hightville and the Wee MacGregor mine a 77-metre (253 ft) long unlined tunnel, with concrete portals, and a 1-in-22 grade towards the mine, was constructed through MacGregor Hill. The tunnel was nearly completed by January 1915, with rails laid 5 chains (330 ft; 100 m) through it by 11 March 1915. The secretary of the Hampden Company announced that the 2 ft tramway from Mineral [Ballara] to the Wee MacGregor had been completed, and would be used from 15 May 1915.

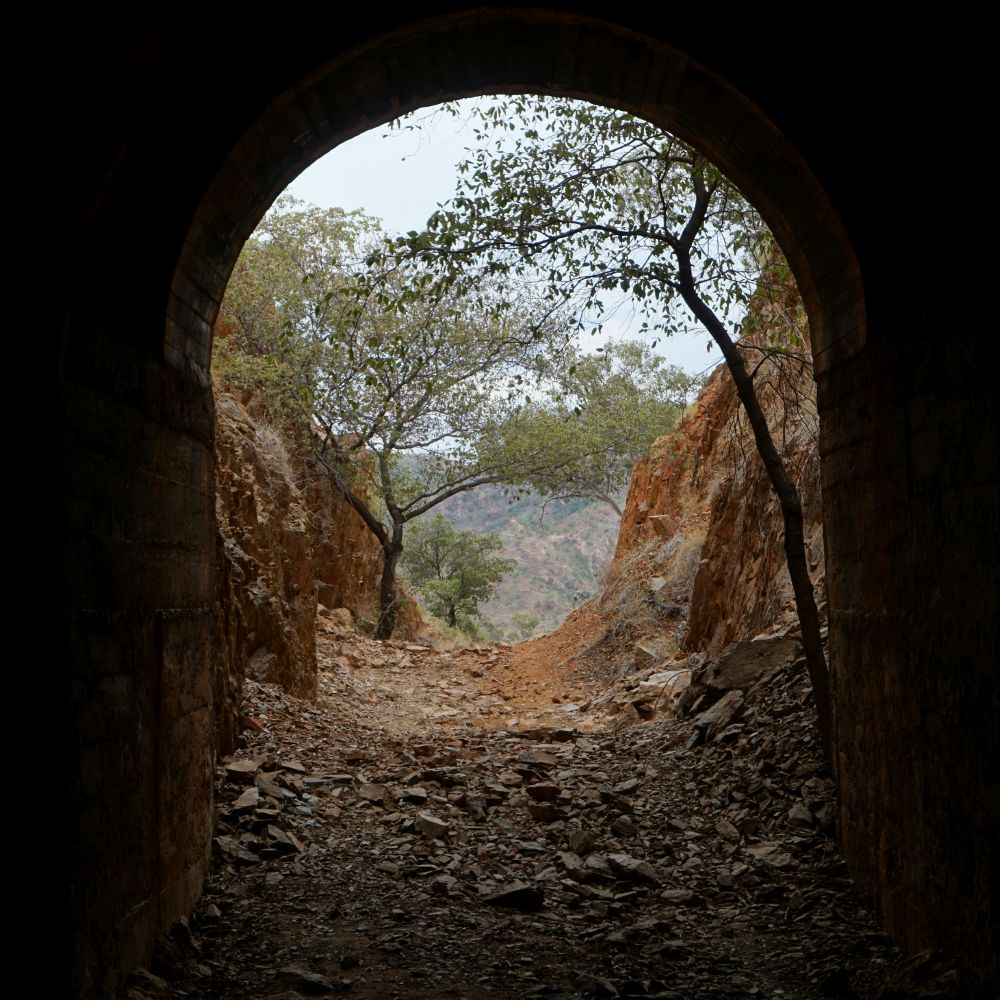
North portal of tunnel, 2018

The tramway was transporting ore by 31 May 1915. It had cost £11,005, and had curves as tight as 2 chains (130 ft; 40 m) radius. The tunnel remains the most westerly railway tunnel in Queensland, and the 47.9 metres (157 ft) long, 2.65 metres (8 ft 8 in) high ore transfer stage is unique as the only recorded tramway-to-railway ore transhipment platform in Queensland. Between 1866 and 1996, 64 bored tunnels were constructed in Queensland for Queensland Rail, while three tunnels were also built for private railways: the Linda Tunnel at Mount Morgan (1905, 3 ft 6in gauge), Lahey's Tramway at Canungra (1901, 3 ft 6in gauge), and the tunnel for the Wee MacGregor Tramway. The locomotive used on the Wee MacGregor tramway was thought to be a Krauss 0-4-0T (referring to the arrangement of wheels: four powered wheels with no unpowered wheels in front or behind them). However, a photograph of the Krauss (No.6416) used on the Wee MacGregor 2 ft tramway shows a 0–6-0 wheel arrangement. This locomotive was later used at the Kalamia Mill in Ayr, and then as a stationary boiler at Plantation Creek, before being abandoned in 1949.

The Annual Report of the Under Secretary of Mines for 1915 stated that "a 2-ft gauge tramway, four miles [6.4km] in length, from Ballara, connects the MacGregor and Wallaroo Mines with the main line, and carries 50 tons of ore per day in three train loads to Ballara, conveying firewood, mine timber, and general stores as return loading". Camels transported smelted copper from the Rosebud mine (north of the Wee MacGregor mine) to Ballara railway station. In October 1915. It was also reported that Mineral (Ballara) was "some four miles [6.4km] from the MacGregor mine on the Hightville railway [2ft tramway] line". The route of the 2 foot tramway, from the top of the turning triangle at Ballara to the Wee MacGregor mine, appears to cover about 6.1 km. Other mines were also served by the existence of the 2 ft tramway and 3 ft 6in railway lines.

Three trains a week had run along the railway from 25 May to 15 June 1914. However, the start of WWI on 4 August 1914 led to a temporary halt to mining, as German buyers held the contracts for the sale of copper. Only one supply train a week was run to Ballara until early 1915, when the Allied demand for copper revived mining and railway activity. Around 300 tons of ore was railed from Ballara each week during the war, and annual passenger numbers peaked at 4533 in 1916. During 1915, the railway to Ballara handled 12,786 tons of freight, rising to over 21,000 tons in 1916 and 1917, and 21,805 tons in 1918.

Wartime copper prices boosted the fortunes of the whole Cloncurry Gold and Mineral Field. The London market price for copper rose from under £60 a ton to £84 10s during 1915, and the Cloncurry district produced 53% of Queensland's copper that year. During 1916, copper prices rose from £85 to £150 a ton, and in September 1917 British Munitions authorities fixed the price at £110 5s. The Cloncurry field produced 63.2% of Queensland's copper in 1918, when the total population of the field reached 7795, with 100 men employed at the Wee MacGregor mine in December 1917. Prospecting shafts were also dug at the Pindora mines, located 4 km south of the MacGregor Junction to Ballara railway. Instead of a branch railway to the Pindora mines, motor lorries were used to carry ore from the Pindora mines to the Pindora siding.

Copper prices dropped after the end of WWI, falling from £112 per ton in December 1918 to £75 per ton in April 1919. By March 1919 it was reported that the price slump and a scarcity of workers had "dealt a knockout blow to all", although a new shaft was still being sunk on the Wee MacGregor mine. Copper production on the Cloncurry field fell in 1919, and only one train a week ran to Ballara, with 2170 tons of freight carried during the year - a 90% reduction from 1918.

In its nine years of smelting, 1911–1920, the Hampden Company produced 50,800 tons of copper. In 1920 the smelters of the Cloncurry district produced £701,717 of copper, out of Queensland's annual production of £1,551,995 (compared to £489,701 of gold) and there were 812 copper miners on the field. By 1920, the total value of copper won in Queensland to that year totalled £24,221,919 - second only to gold's earnings of £83,645,610, and tin was third, at £9,803,019.

However, at the end of 1920, copper prices were £72 a ton. This, along with high overheads, caused the closure of the Wee MacGregor mine in November 1920. The Hampden Company blamed industrial action, high wages and increasing railway freight rates for making its low-grade mines unprofitable. Tenders were invited in December 1920 for purchase of the "MacGregor Mines tramway", including "about 4 miles of 2 foot gauge tramway, built of 28lb. steel rails, iron sleepers, locomotive and ten bogie trucks". The tramway's rails were removed during 1921 and stacked at Ballara. The train service to Ballara dropped to once a month from February 1921, when there were still 17 families in the town, plus "copper gougers" (small mine operators) in the area. During 1921 the railway only carried 199 tons of freight.

Train services to Ballara were maintained by the government throughout most of the 1920s. In October 1922 a service from Cloncurry to Ballara ran on alternate Wednesdays. The discovery of a large silver-lead deposit at Mount Isa in 1923 raised hopes that the railway could be extended from Ballara to Mount Isa, but the line was constructed from Duchess instead. The Hampden Company forfeited its mining lease of the tramway route in 1923. The police station was moved to Mount Isa in 1924. Services to Ballara alternated between a weekly and a fortnightly schedule until early 1927, when regular services ended.

The line to Mount Isa opened in May 1929. Large reserves of copper were discovered at Mount Isa in 1941. By the end of 1965, the Black Rock open cut (1957) had yielded more copper than all the mines of the Cloncurry field had yielded in their entire history.

The MacGregor Junction to Ballara railway survived for a short while longer, as 38 tons of minerals and 10 tons of other goods were carried in the 1928–29 financial year, from Pindora siding. The rails between MacGregor Junction and Ballara were removed in 1929, and were stacked at Malbon. There were complaints that a final train was not even sent out to evacuate 30 copper gougers and their families.

After the mine's closure in 1920, Ballara's decline was inevitable. In 1920 Wise's Post Office Directory listed a district and a maternity hospital at Ballara; plus a school teacher; butchers; refreshment rooms; stores; a boarding house; a station and post master; and the MacGregor and Ballara Hotels. In 1925 WJ Mathews ran a store and the Macgregor Hotel. ). The school closed in February 1925. In 1926 Robert Letham ran the MacGregor Hotel. By 1927 no names or institutions were listed under Ballara.

Although the tramway and railway had closed, and Hightville and Ballara were abandoned, copper gougers retained an interest in the Wee MacGregor area over the following decades. In 1954, prospectors also discovered uranium deposits at Ballara. New work occurred at the Wee MacGregor mine, with new buildings constructed at Hightville, sometime between 1968 and 1972. Several concrete slabs at the site of Hightville date from the early 1970s, during a period of renewed mining activity at the Wee MacGregor mine when Eastern Copper Mines N.L. used acid leaching to extract copper from the Wee MacGregor's ore. In 2018, exploratory drilling work was underway at the mine.

== Description ==
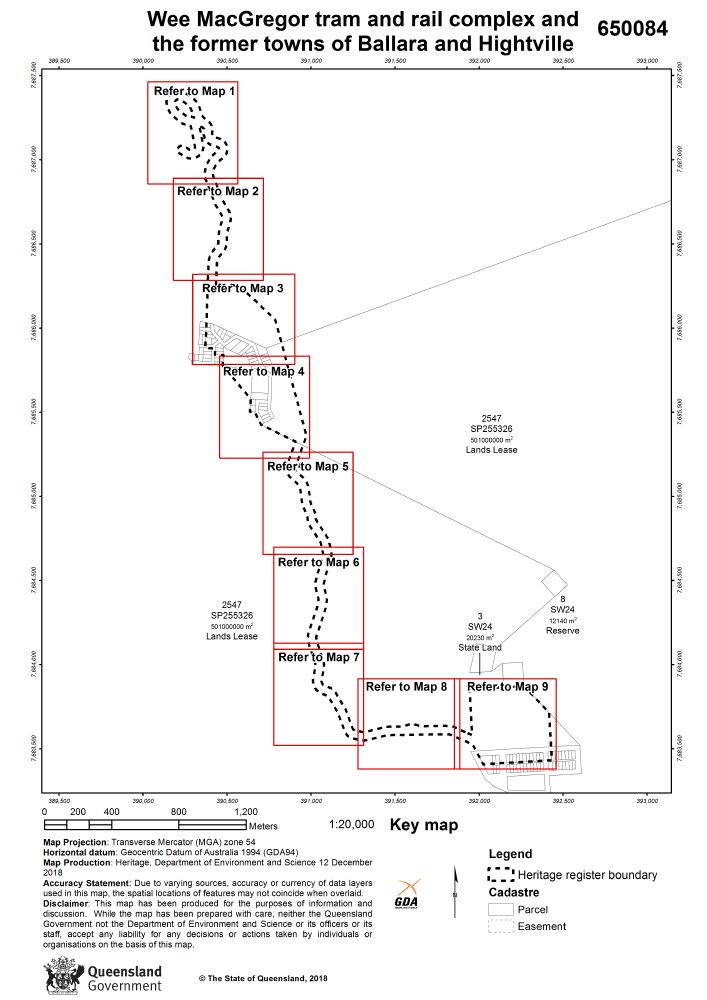
Overview map

The Wee MacGregor tramway and rail complex and the former towns of Ballara and Hightville (c. 1909-1929), is located approximately 17 km south of the Barkly Highway, roughly halfway between Mt Isa and Cloncurry. The place comprises the ruins of the:

- Ballara railway terminus – western terminus of the former 3 ft 6in (1.1m) gauge MacGregor Junction (Devoncourt) to Ballara railway
- Ballara to Wee MacGregor tramway formation – former 2 ft (0.6m) gauge, 3.8 mile (6.1 km) long tramway, between the Ballara railway terminus (south) and the former Wee MacGregor Mine
- ore transfer stage (500m west of Ballara railway station) – where copper ore brought south from the mine on the tramway was transferred to the railway
- former towns of Ballara and Hightville (1.2 km south of the mine)

Set in the Argylla Ranges, the terrain varies from south to north, being relatively low and flat around Ballara and increasingly hilly, steep and elevated towards and beyond Hightville, with expansive views offered from vantage points at Hightville and north of the tunnel. The rocky landscape is traversed by dry creeks and gullies, and vegetation includes Spinifex, Acacia and Eucalypt species.

While the ruins have been subject to deterioration and some disturbance, they continue to illustrate characteristics of their former functions and relationships. Collectively the remnant earthworks, structures, archaeological features and artefact scatters are a physical legacy of early 20th century mining transport infrastructure and associated occupation in the area. The place has the potential to reveal important information about the construction and operation of remote mining transport infrastructure, and the people who lived and worked there.

The following description identifies significant features evident along the former tramway formation, and at the railway terminus and town sites, and is based on a site visit undertaken by DES in October 2018. Refer to place maps 1–9 for feature locations, areas of archaeological potential and previous surface disturbance.

=== Ballara railway terminus ===
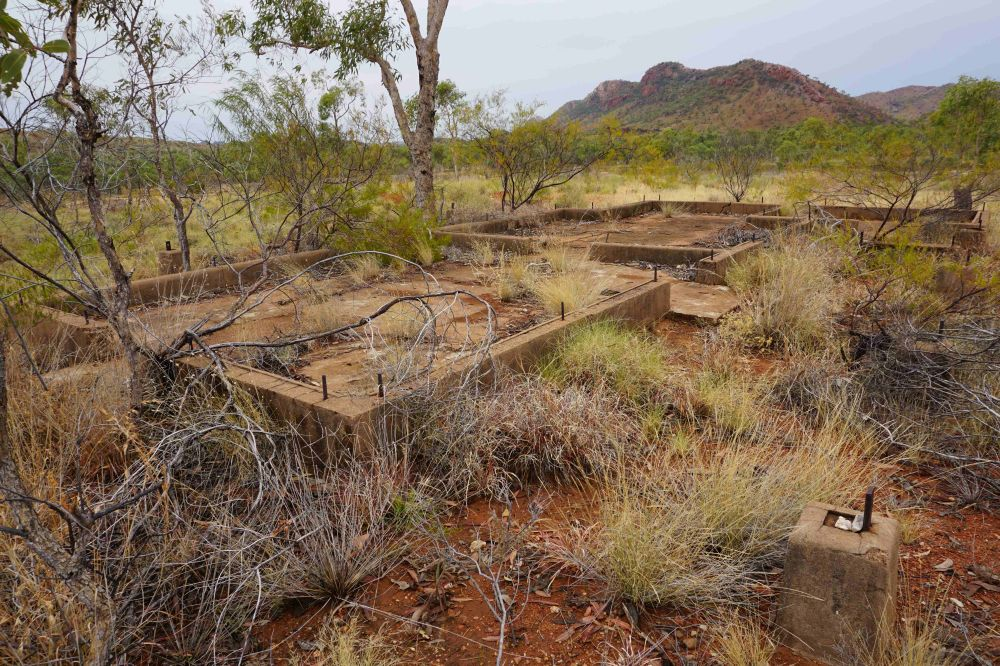
Foundations of the former mine managers's residence, Ballara, 2018

Located north of the former town of Ballara, the railway terminus comprises: the former railway line, which aligned approximately east–west, and continued west from the former Ballara Station, past the freight platform and to just west of the ore transfer stage; and a former turning triangle formed by sidings that curved north from both the tramway and the railway towards former maintenance buildings.

The route of the former railway line (tracks removed 1929) is evidenced by a cutting, at and west of the former station, and several culverts between the turning triangle and ore transfer station. From near the freight platform and westwards has been graded for use as a modern dirt road.

The former turning triangle is evidenced by earthworks including: a 50m long curved embankment, aligned northwest to southeast and located approximately 80m northwest of the railway station; and a 65m straight embankment, aligned north–south and located 140m north of the freight platform, with a culvert midway.

The former Ballara railway station (east) and freight platform (west) are of similar construction and situated approximately 110m apart; both are positioned on the south side of the railway line and aligned east–west. Along with the maintenance buildings, they retain concrete building footings with 150–205mm thick off-form concrete wall bases that have rebated tops and embedded metal bolts, to which the (possibly prefabricated) building superstructure was fixed. Platforms have 600mm x 65mm thick precast concrete bullnose capping in 1.2m lengths.

A collection of footings from former maintenance buildings are aligned north–south and located either side of the northern end of the former turning triangle:

A range of metal artefacts including rail wagons / ore bins are scattered around the terminus, and evidence of occupation includes sites to the west and northwest of the turning triangle.

=== Ore transfer stage ===
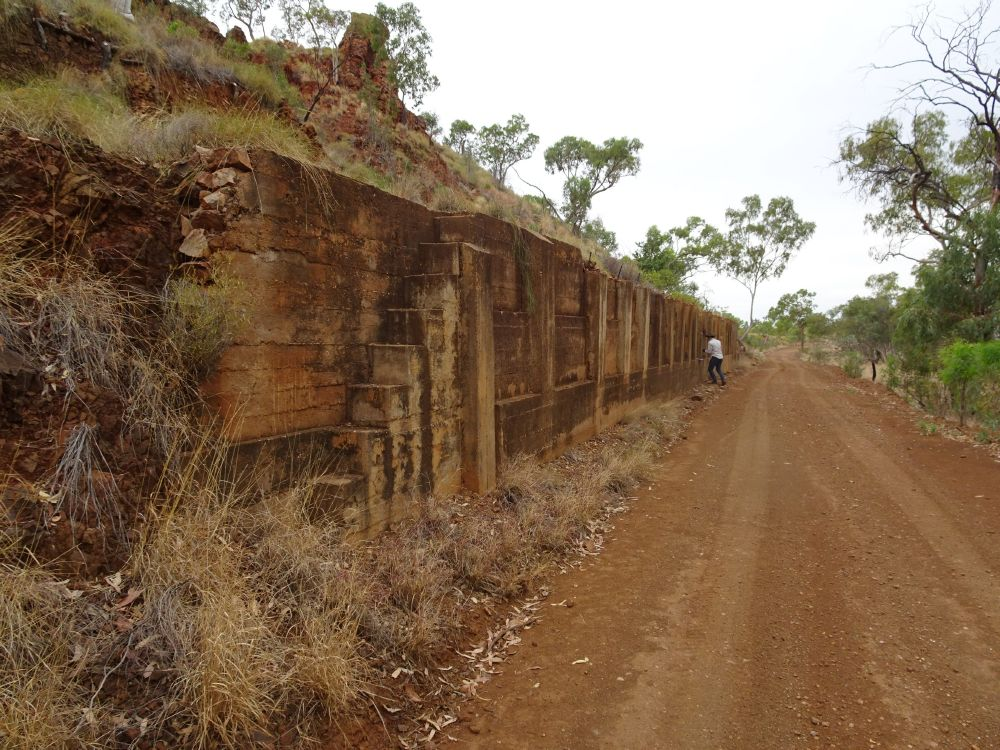
Former ore transfer stage, from tramway (raised on left) to railway (lower right), 2018

The ore transfer stage aligns east–west and comprises parallel stepped cuttings from the former railway (south, lower - recently graded) and tramway (north, upper) alignments, separated by a substantial concrete and earth platform that is flanked by a drystone retaining wall (east) and a curved embankment (west).

=== Ballara to Wee MacGregor tramway formation ===
The overall trajectory of the winding tramway formation between Ballara and the Wee MacGregor Mine is southeast to northwest (as constructed). From the ore loading stage the formation continues west approximately 400m, through relatively low, flat terrain. After a tight curve, the formation winds north, following and crossing a creek line, then to the east of the Hightville Cemetery, and includes the abutments of several bridges. The formation continues through the increasingly steep and elevated terrain, around the eastern and northern sides of Hightville, where the former Wallaroo Mine line branched to the northeast. North of Hightville, the formation passes through a tunnel and a series of tight curves form a loop around a hilltop at the northern end, finishing to the east of the former Wee MacGregor Mine.

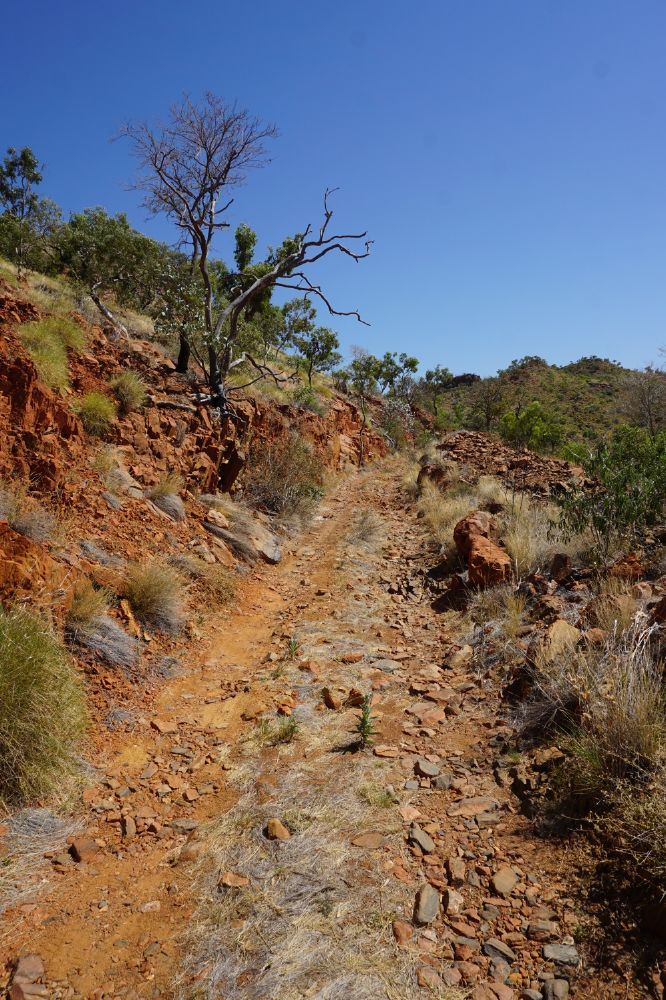
Tramway cutting between Hightville and tunnel, from south, 2018

While the tracks are no longer extant (removed 1921), the tramway formation is evidenced by earthworks including over 40 embankments and cuttings, drystone walls, culverts and eight bridge abutments. The scale, design and construction of these features ranges in response to the varying terrain, maintaining an optimal tramway gradient. Modern graded roads follow and cross parts of the formation, and have disturbed the surface in some areas.

Cuttings and embankments along the tramway generally comprise straight and curved linear alignments, cut into and built up from the rocky contours and approaches to creek crossings. Relatively shallow cuttings and low earth embankments, some with local drystone pitching, are prevalent in the southern half of the formation, where there are numerous former bridges, while earthworks responding to the steeper terrain to the north combine more substantial cuttings, embankments and drystone retaining walls. Most embankments, and some cuttings, incorporate concrete culverts, often with stonework surrounding the outlets. Deep, straight cuttings, through bedrock, approach the north and south tunnel entrances; erosion has raised the ground level of the southern cutting. Drystone retaining walls are generally constructed of random-coursed local stone. In the tight curves of the northern loop they are several metres high and retain the benched earth formation.

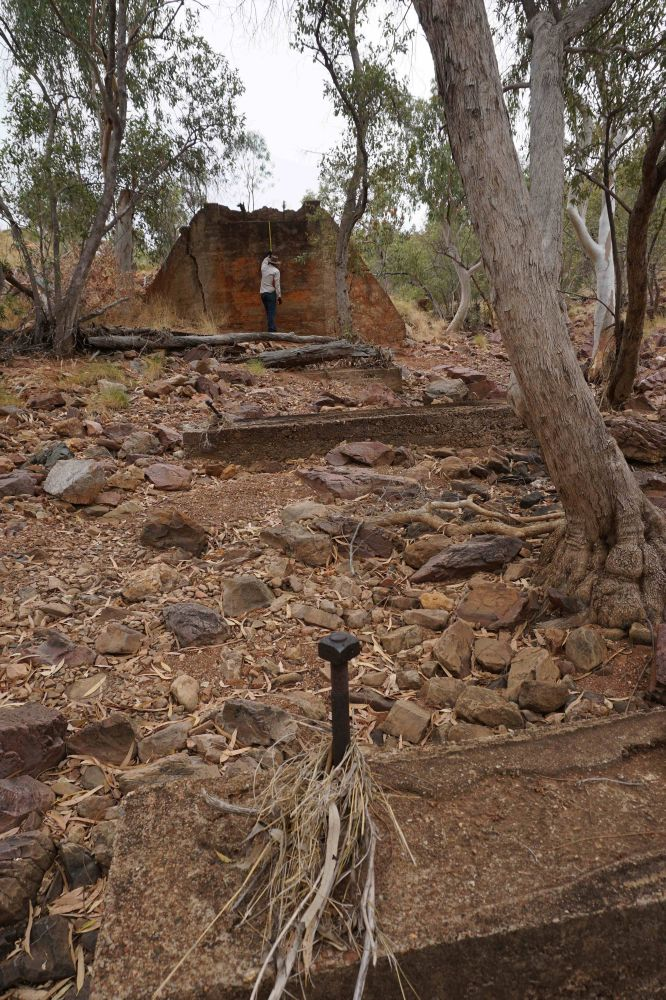
Pier footings of Bridge 1, from south, 2018

Bridge remnants generally comprise off-form concrete winged abutments and rectangular concrete pier footings, with rebated edges (abutments only) and exposed metal bolts for fixing the timber structure. Abutment walls are generally 2.7–2.8m wide (plus angled wing walls of varying lengths) and spans range from 4.67m to 26.2m. The concrete has aggregate of varying size, including smooth creek pebbles. Former bridges from south to north include:

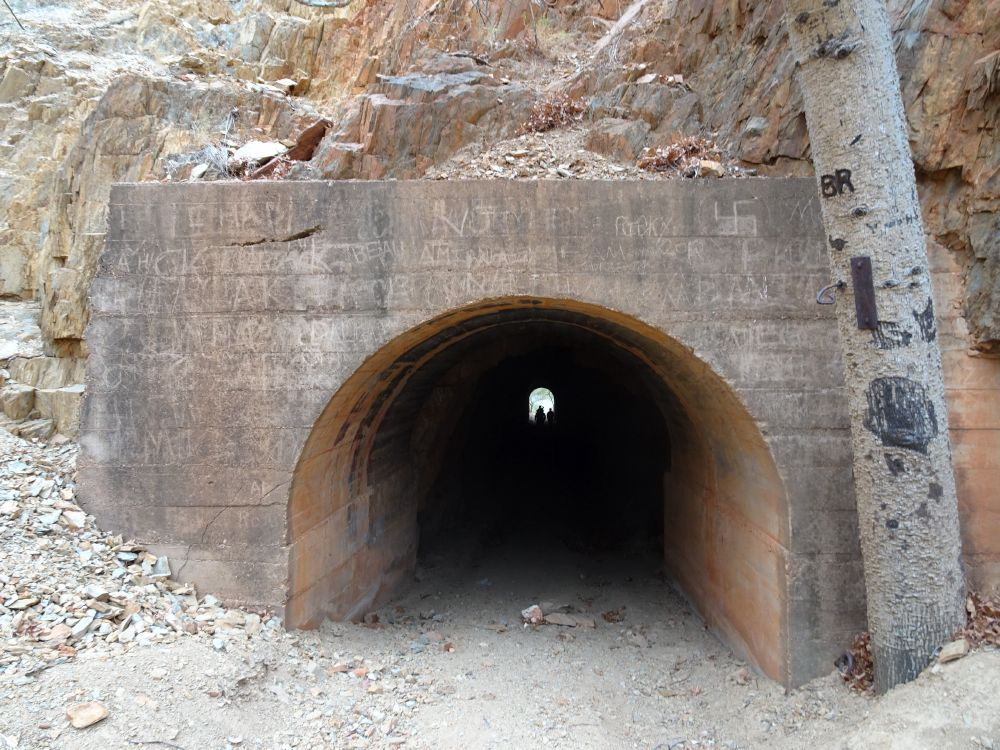
Southern portal of the tunnel, 2018

Along the tramway between the Wee MacGregor Mine and Hightville, the 77m long unlined tunnel through MacGregor Hill is orientated northwest–southeast and has rough-finished off-form concrete portals at both ends.

Concrete culverts are evident along the length of the tramway formation. The majority are pre-cast concrete pipe culverts, some with stone surrounding the outlets, of varying sizes (approximately 300mm-750mm diameter) and single and double-pipe configurations. Two substantial off-form box culverts are located at the railway turning triangle and near the approach to Wee Macgregor Mine. They have rectangular openings flanked by angled concrete wings and a drystone retaining wall surround (northern culvert only).

A former store and office is located east of the tramway formation, at Hightville, near the branch line to Wallaroo. Aligned north-south, it comprises a rectangular 13.5m x 6.3m two-tier building footprint of earth platforms surrounded by stone that is loosely coursed in some areas. The lower tier (west) is 2.5m wide, and the upper tier (east) is 3.8m wide and divided into two (7.2m and 6.2m) rooms; it is 400mm high, with several courses of stone at the southern end.

Evidence of occupation dotted along the tramway includes a possible well, earth / stone platforms and hearths, and associated artefacts.

=== Former town of Ballara ===
The surveyed (1914) town site of Ballara comprises former Ainscow Street, which is orientated approximately east–west, and former Peberdy and Knox streets running perpendicular to the south. A Police Reserve (gazetted 1915) was located at the western end of former Ainscow Street. Evidence of domestic and commercial premises, concentrated along former Ainscow Street, includes earth, stone and concrete building foundations and platforms, and associated glass, metal and ceramic artefacts.

The site of the former manager's residence, on the northern side of former Ainscow Street, comprises concrete building footings for an L-shaped building core, with verandah post footings on the northern, eastern and southern sides. All footings are off-form concrete, with embedded metal bolts and brackets for fixing the superstructure. The core is 12.8m x 4.7–5.5m, and has a concrete slab floor and 230mm high wall bases that outline four rooms. Concrete steps, offset by 5.7m at the eastern end, are 650mm high and have evidence of light green paint.

A row of apparent shops and/or dwellings, visible along the southern side of former Ainscow Street in historical photographs of the town, are evidenced by an alignment of building footings and associated artefacts.

=== Former town of Hightville ===
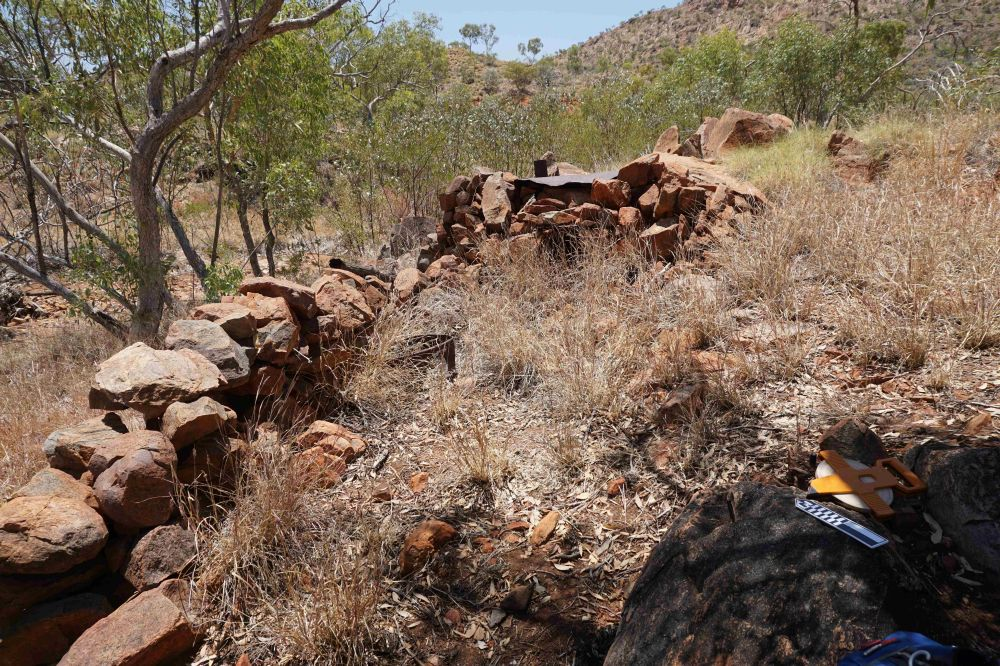
Evidence of habitation at Hightville, 2018

Located to the west and southwest of the tramway, the mining town of Hightville included: former Fountain Street, which followed a ridge in a north–south then northwest–southeast alignment; former Warrick Street, which zig-zagged to the northwest around a Police Reserve (gazetted 1918) and partly followed Wattle Creek; and Knox Street, which ran southwest off Warrick Street.

In contrast with Ballara, Hightville was surveyed (1913) several years after it was established (c. 1909) and evidence of occupation can be found both within and to the north of the surveyed town; it includes earth and stone platforms, hearths and footings, and associated artefact scatters from domestic and commercial premises, as well as a town dump to the south. The building remnants appear less formal than those at Ballara and are constructed using predominately locally sourced materials.

Occupation sites are located within the surveyed town, in the vicinity of former Fountain and Warrick streets. Several former dwelling and nearby dump sites are located west of the intersection of Warrick and Knox streets: Further occupation sites located to the north of the surveyed town.

The town dump comprises a collection of four distinct deposits (3.2m x 6.4m, 4.8m x 5.5m, 2.6m dia., and 2m x 3.3m) of predominantly green glass bottles and tin cans. There is some evidence of recent disturbance from shallow excavation. A survey cairn is located on a hill to the west of the dump.

== Heritage listing ==
Wee MacGregor railway was listed on the Queensland Heritage Register on 1 March 2019 having satisfied the following criteria.

The place is important in demonstrating the evolution or pattern of Queensland's history.

The Wee MacGregor tram and rail complex and the former towns of Ballara and Hightville (c. 1909-29), which includes the well-engineered route of a 2 ft (0.6m) gauge tramway and the terminus of a 3-foot-6-inch (1.07 m) narrow gauge railway, is important in demonstrating the major role of copper mining in the Queensland economy in the early 20th century, and the importance of railways to the economic viability of remote mines.

The place demonstrates the pattern of primary industry-based, private and local government railway and tramway construction, which flourished in 19th century and early 20th century Queensland. The construction of the 3-foot-6-inch (1.07 m) railway from MacGregor Junction (Devoncourt) to Ballara was an early example of government-private sector co-operation in building mining railways.

The short lifespans of the tramway (1915–21), the railway (1914–29), and the towns of Hightville (c. 1909-20) and Ballara (1914–26) are representative of the temporary nature of many mining towns and associated railways in Queensland, and their vulnerability to fluctuating commodity prices.

The place demonstrates rare, uncommon or endangered aspects of Queensland's cultural heritage.

In its form, layout and materials, the ore transfer stage, an integral element in the operation of the complex, is rare as the only known historic tramway-to-railway ore transhipment platform constructed in Queensland.

The place has potential to yield information that will contribute to an understanding of Queensland's history.

The Wee MacGregor tram and rail complex and the former towns of Ballara and Hightville has the potential to reveal important information about early 20th century remote mining transport infrastructure, activities associated with its construction and operation, and the people who lived and worked in this ephemeral mining landscape.

Archaeological investigations of the extensive tramway formation and adjacent railway terminus may address important research questions relating to: layout, design, material and construction responses to the remoteness and physical challenges of the local environment, including comparison between the surveyed and constructed tramway route; and the design and operation of dual-gauge mining transport networks.

The Ballara and Hightville town sites may facilitate detailed studies relating to the social dynamics of the community and its development, interaction, and decline. Archaeological investigations, including comparative studies, can inform understandings of domestic and commercial activities, living conditions, the layout of the settlements, construction methods and the use of materials.

The place is important in demonstrating the principal characteristics of a particular class of cultural places.

The place is an example of an early 20th century Queensland mining railway complex. In its surviving fabric the place retains: evidence at Ballara of railway buildings, a triangular junction, and the terminus of a railway line, with cuttings, embankments and culverts. It also retains the route of a tramway, from the triangular junction to the Wee MacGregor mine, and its associated infrastructure, including: an ore transfer stage; a tunnel, which is the most westerly railway tunnel in Queensland; plus bridge abutments and piers, culverts, cuttings, embankments and stone retaining walls.

The place is important because of its aesthetic significance.

The ruinous nature of the Wee MacGregor tram and rail complex, set in a remote, sparsely-vegetated and rocky landscape, evokes a sense of isolation, abandonment, and the hardship of the lives of those who lived and worked there. The qualities of the ascending formation can be experienced from a range of vantage points along the tramway route.
