= Kuridala, Queensland =

Kuridala
- Suburb
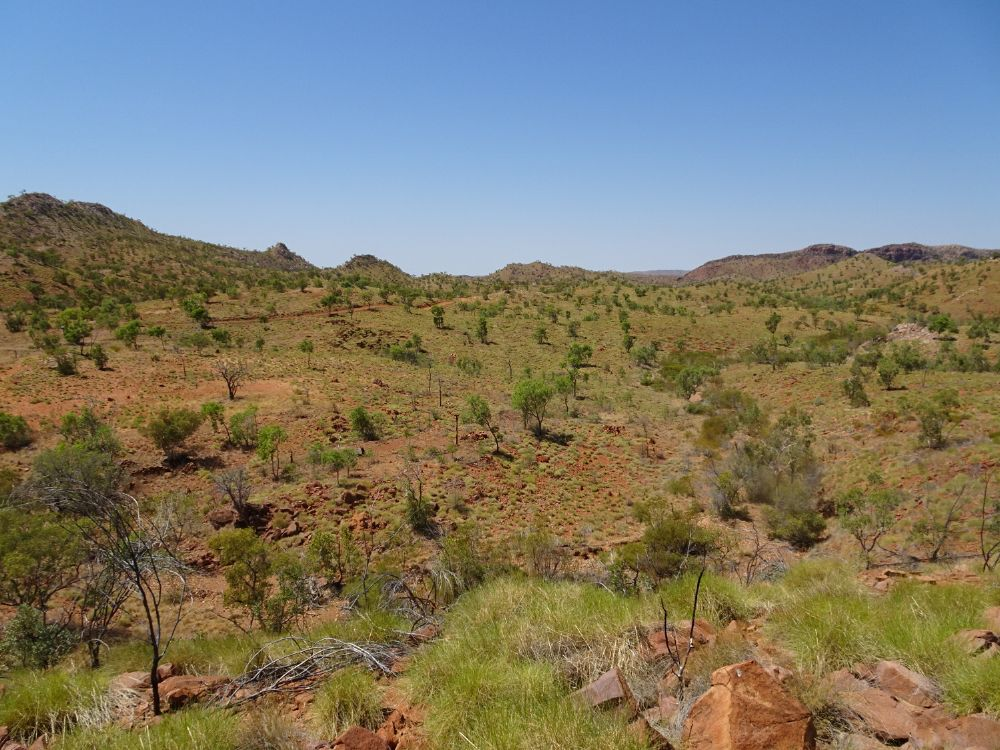
- Kuridala landscape, 2018

- Interactive map of Kuridala
- Coordinates: 21.1027°S 140.3825°E
- Country: Australia
- State: Queensland
- LGA: Shire of Cloncurry
- Location: 73.7 km (45.8 mi) SSW of Cloncurry; 155 km (96 mi) SE of Mount Isa CBD; 858 km (533 mi) WSW of Townsville; 1,778 km (1,105 mi) NW of Brisbane

Government
  - State electorate: Traeger
  - Federal division: Kennedy

Area
  - Total: 5,859.3 km^{2} (2,262.3 sq mi)

Population
  - Total: 38 (2021 census)
  - Density: 0.00649/km^{2} (0.01680/sq mi)
- Time zone: UTC+10:00 (AEST)
- Postcode: 4824
Suburbs around Kuridala
| Cloncurry | Cloncurry | Cloncurry |
| Duchess | Kuridala | McKinlay |
| Duchess | Selwyn | McKinlay |

Kuridala, formerly known as Friezland (German: [fʁiːt͡slant] FREETS-lahnt), is a rural locality in the Shire of Cloncurry, Queensland, Australia. It contains the former mining town of the same name. In the 2021 census, Kuridala had a population of 38 people.

== Geography ==
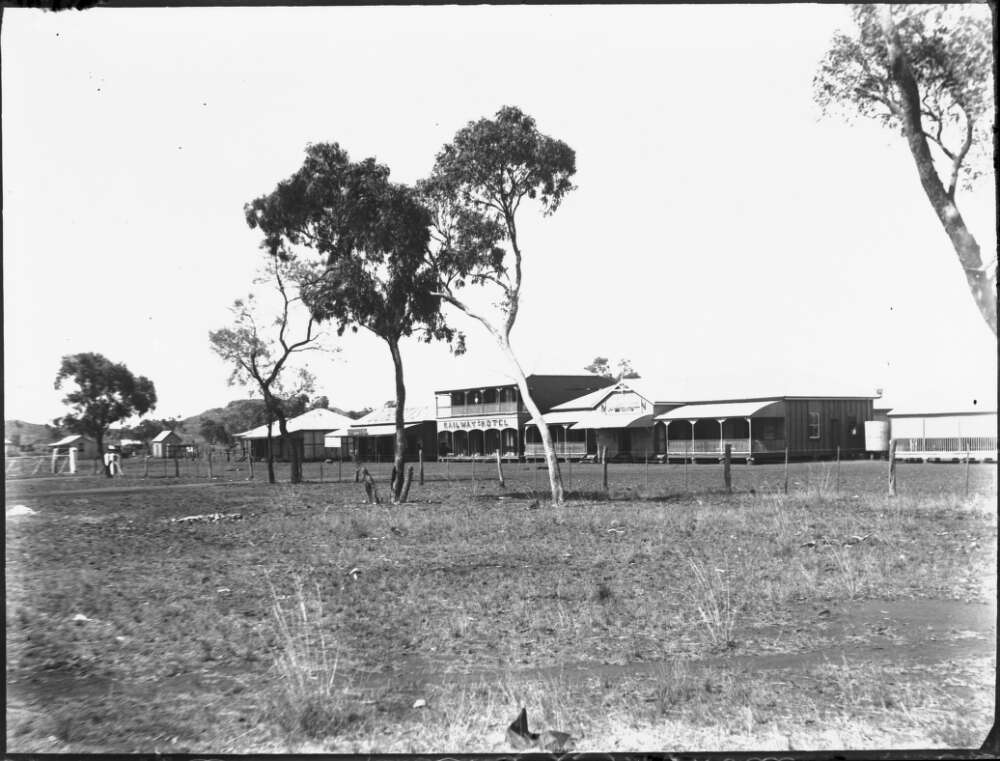
Malbon, circa 1940

Malbon is a town in the centre of the locality (21.0741°S 140.3013°E).

Ballara (20.9458°S 139.9633°E) is the now abandoned ruins of a settlement that supported the Wee MacGregor Mine. It is the north-west of the locality.

The abandoned mining town of Kuridala is in the south of the locality (21.28472°S 140.50833°E).

The Cloncurry Duchess Road (part of the Cloncurry–Dajarra Road) enters the locality from the north (Cloncurry), bypassing the town of Malbon to the west, and exiting to south-west (Duchess).

The Mount Isa railway line also enters the locality from the north (Cloncurry), passes through the town of Malbon which is served by Malbon railway station, and exits to the south-west (Duchess) where it splits into two lines, one bound north-west to Mount Isa and the other south to Selwyn.

There are numerous railway stations along the line within the locality:

- on the Mount Isa railway line (from north to south):
  - Mitakoodi railway station (abandoned, 20.9435°S 140.3081°E)
  - Marraba railway station (abandoned, 20.9894°S 140.3015°E)
  - Malbon railway station (21.0722°S 140.3001°E)
  - Kundora railway station (abandoned, 21.1166°S 140.25°E)
  - Devoncourt railway station, formerly known as Macgregor Junction railway station (abandoned, 21.1455°S 140.1947°E)
  - Wammutta railway station (21.1761°S 140.1463°E)
  - Dronfield railway station (abandoned, 21.2253°S 140.0424°E)
  - Bungalien railway station (21.3010°S 139.9814°E)
  - Flynn railway station (21.3184°S 139.9562°E)
- on the former Selwyn railway line:
  - Pokara railway station (former, 21.1°S 140.3166°E)
  - Florence railway station (former, 21.1738°S 140.3613°E)
  - Kuridala railway station (former, 21.28361°S 140.4997°E)

The predominant land use is grazing on native vegetation.

== History ==
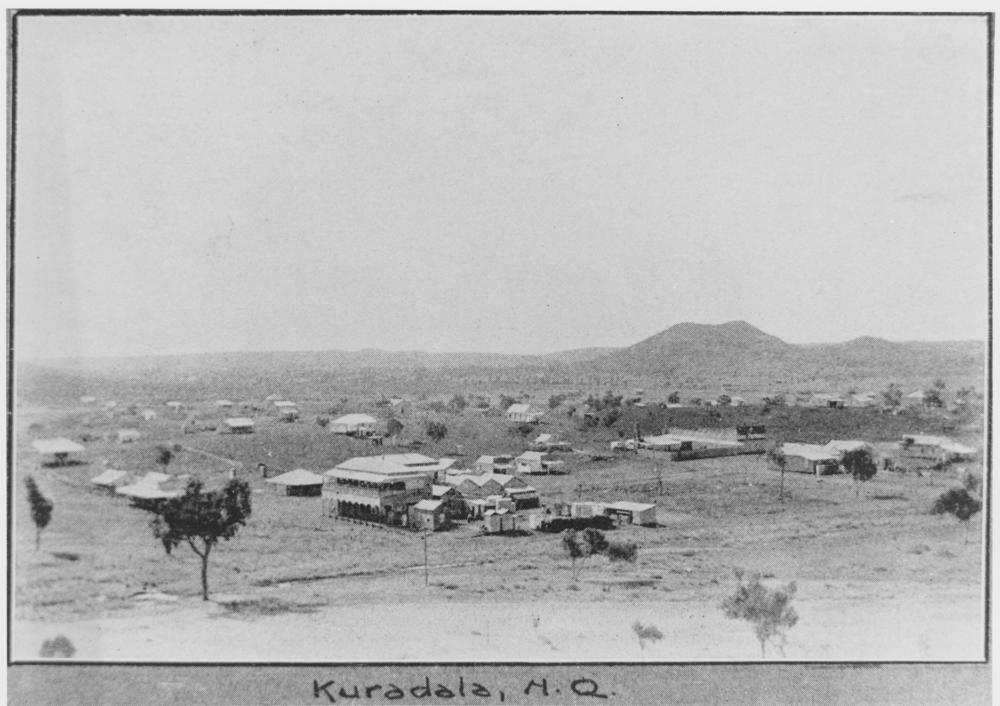
Town of Kuridala, circa 1921

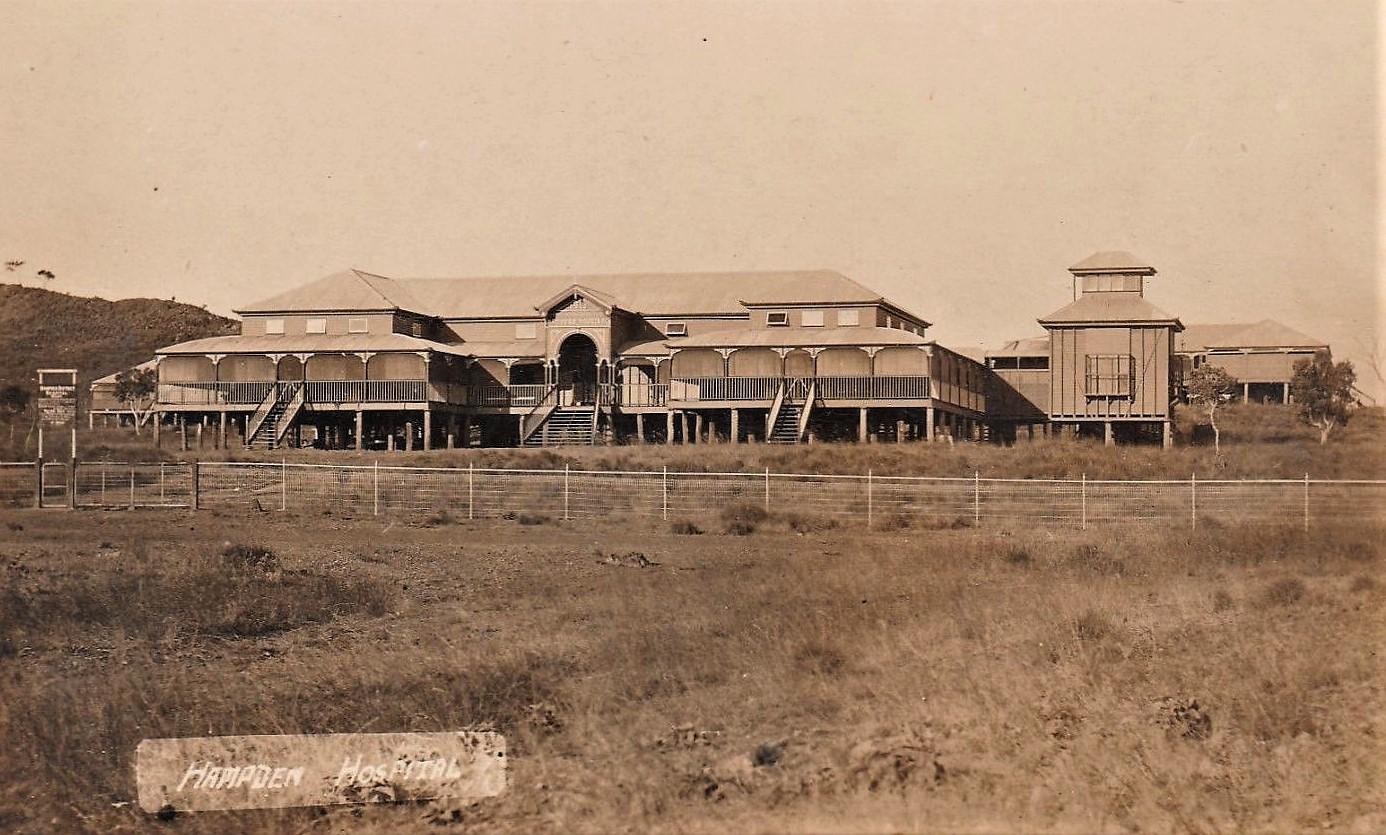
Hospital at Hampden (now Kuridala), early 1900s

The town of Kuridala was originally named Gulatten, then Hampden, then Friezland, and finally Kuridala in October 1916. Kuridala is reportedly an Aboriginal word, language and dialect not recorded, meaning eagle hawk.

Friezland Provisional School opened circa 1901 and closed in 1904 due to low student numbers. It reopened in 1906. On 1 January 1909, it became Friezland State School. In 1920, the school was renamed Kuridala State School in 1920. It closed circa 1932.

Malbon Provisional School opened on 7 November 1911. It became Malbon State School on 1 June 1916. It closed on 8 August 1969. It was on the southern end of the town on a 2-acre (0.81 ha) site on Malbon Selwyn Road (21.07534°S 140.30223°E).

Hightville Provisional School opened circa 1915 and closed circa 1919.

Ballara State School opened circa May 1919 and closed circa March 1925.

== Demographics ==
In the 2016 census, Kuridala had a population of 10 people.

In the 2021 census, Kuridala had a population of 38 people.

== Heritage listings ==
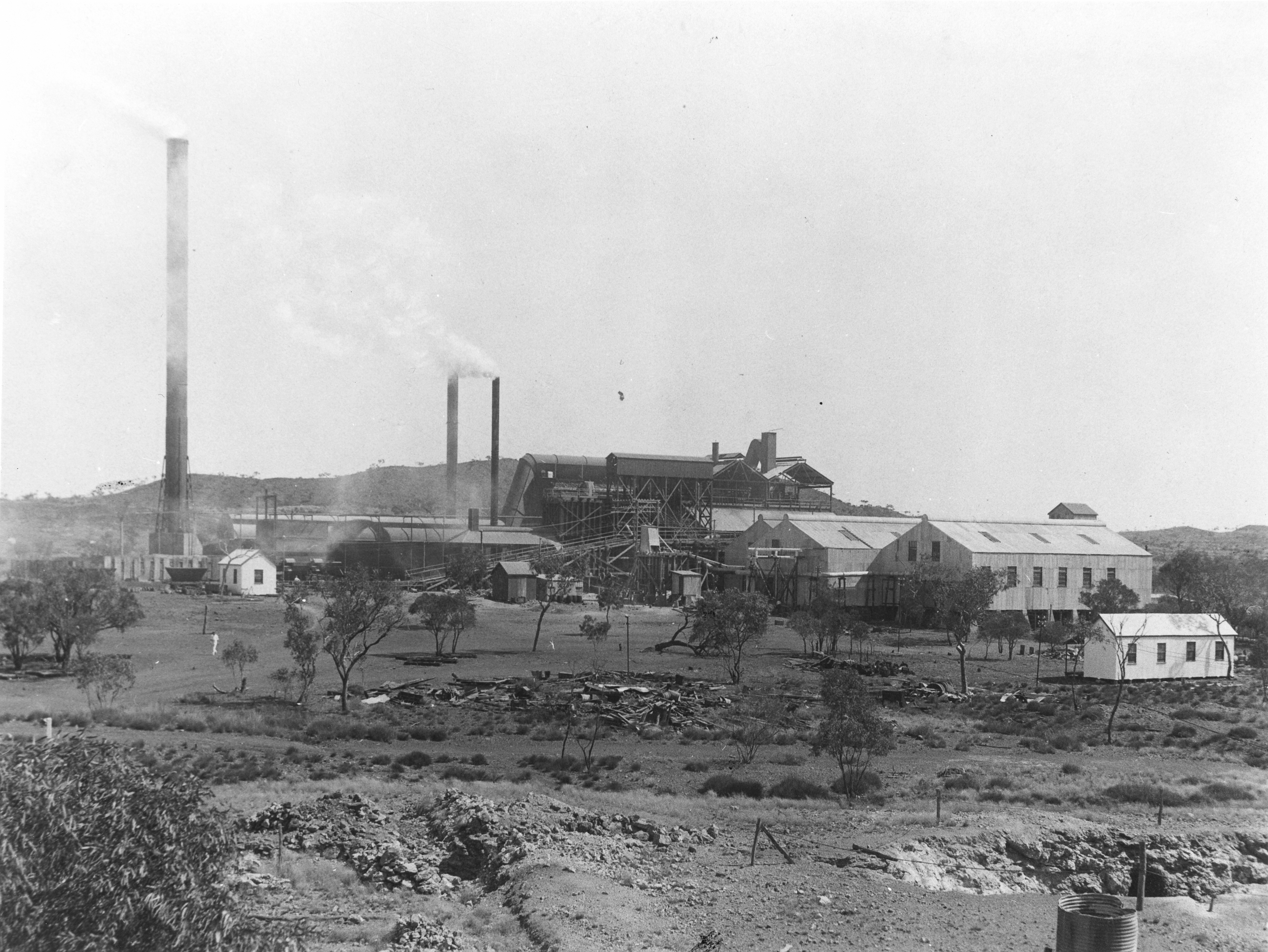
Mine and smelter in Kuridala township, 1916

Kuridala has a number of heritage-listed sites, including:

- Kuridala Township, Hampden Smelter and Mining Complex
- Wee MacGregor railway (20.9252°S 139.9491°E)

== Education ==
There are no schools in the locality. The nearest government school is Cloncurry State School (Prep to Year 12) in Cloncurry to the north. However, only students living in the north-west of the locality would be close enough for a daily commute. The alternatives are distance education and boarding school.

== See also ==
- List of tramways in Queensland
