= Ballara, Queensland =

Ballara Queensland
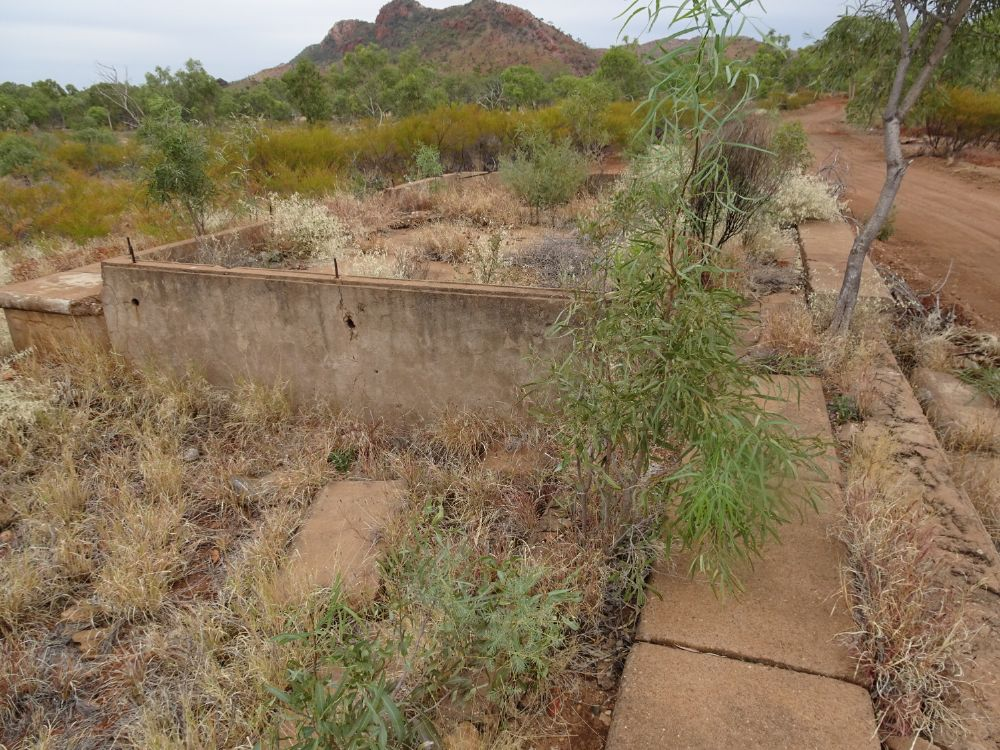
- Former railway freight platform, Ballara, 2018

- Coordinates: 20.9166°S 139.9667°E
- Established: 1914
- Location: 76 km (47 mi) WSW of Cloncurry; 76.6 km (48 mi) ESE of Mount Isa; 860 km (534 mi) WSW of Townsville; 1,780 km (1,106 mi) NW of Brisbane
- LGA(s): Shire of Cloncurry
- State electorate(s): Traeger
- Federal division(s): Kennedy

Ballara is the site of a deserted mining town in the locality of Kuridala in north-western Queensland, Australia, in the Selwyn Range between the towns of Mount Isa and Cloncurry. It is within the local government area of Shire of Cloncurry.

== History ==
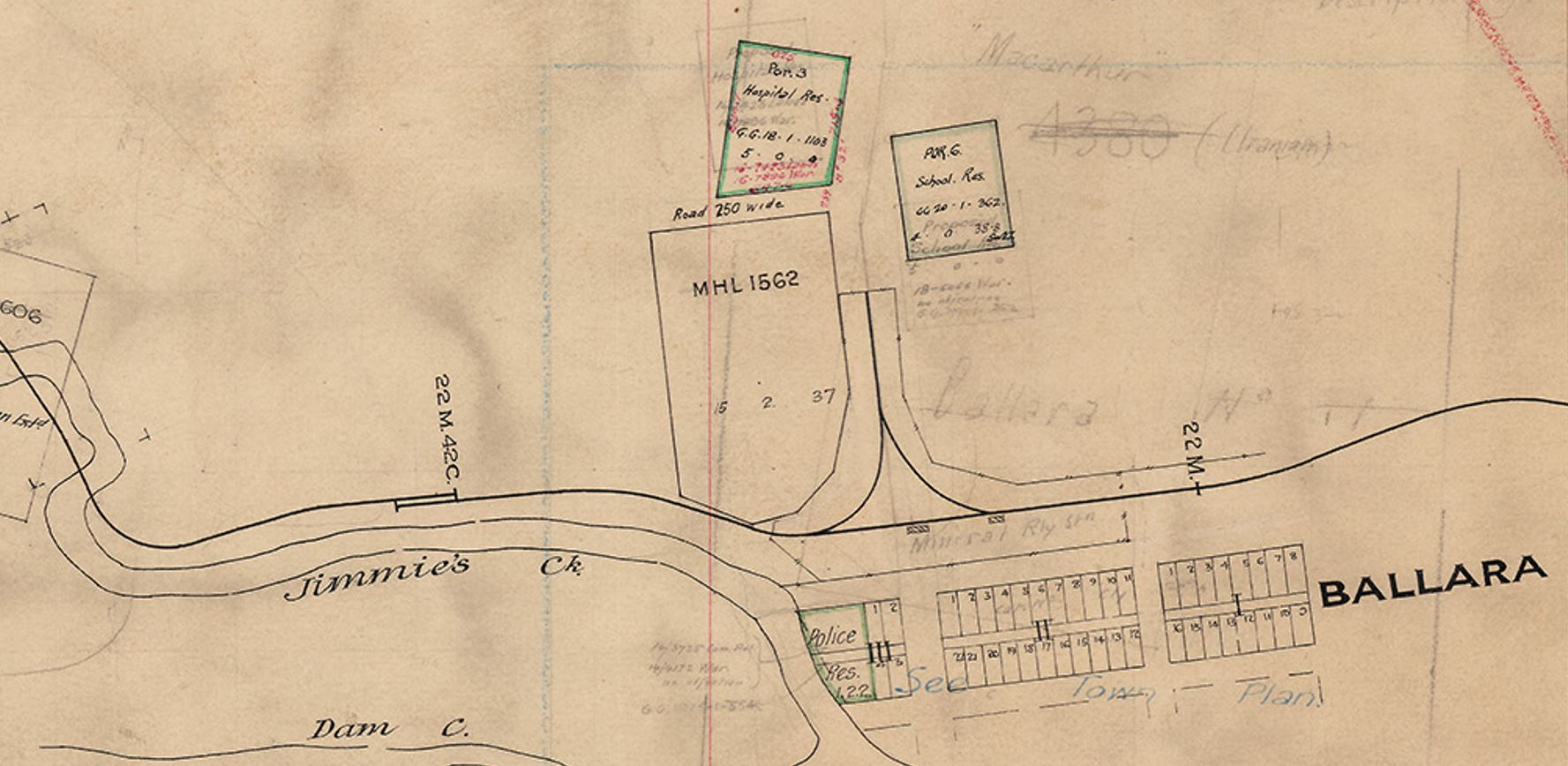
Ballara town map

Ballara Post Office opened circa 1914 (receiving offices had been open at Ballara and Hightville from 1909) and closed in 1927.

Ballara State School opened circa May 1919 and closed circa March 1925. It was located north of the town (20.9418°S 139.9632°E).

== Heritage ==
Ballara includes the remains of a railway station for the long-closed narrow-gauge Wee MacGregor railway (approx 20.94546°S 139.96248°E).

== Environment ==
Ballara is commemorated in the scientific name of the Kalkadoon grasswren (Amytornis ballarae).

== See also ==
- Kuridala Township site
- List of ghost towns
- List of tramways in Queensland
