= Duchess, Queensland =

Duchess
- Town
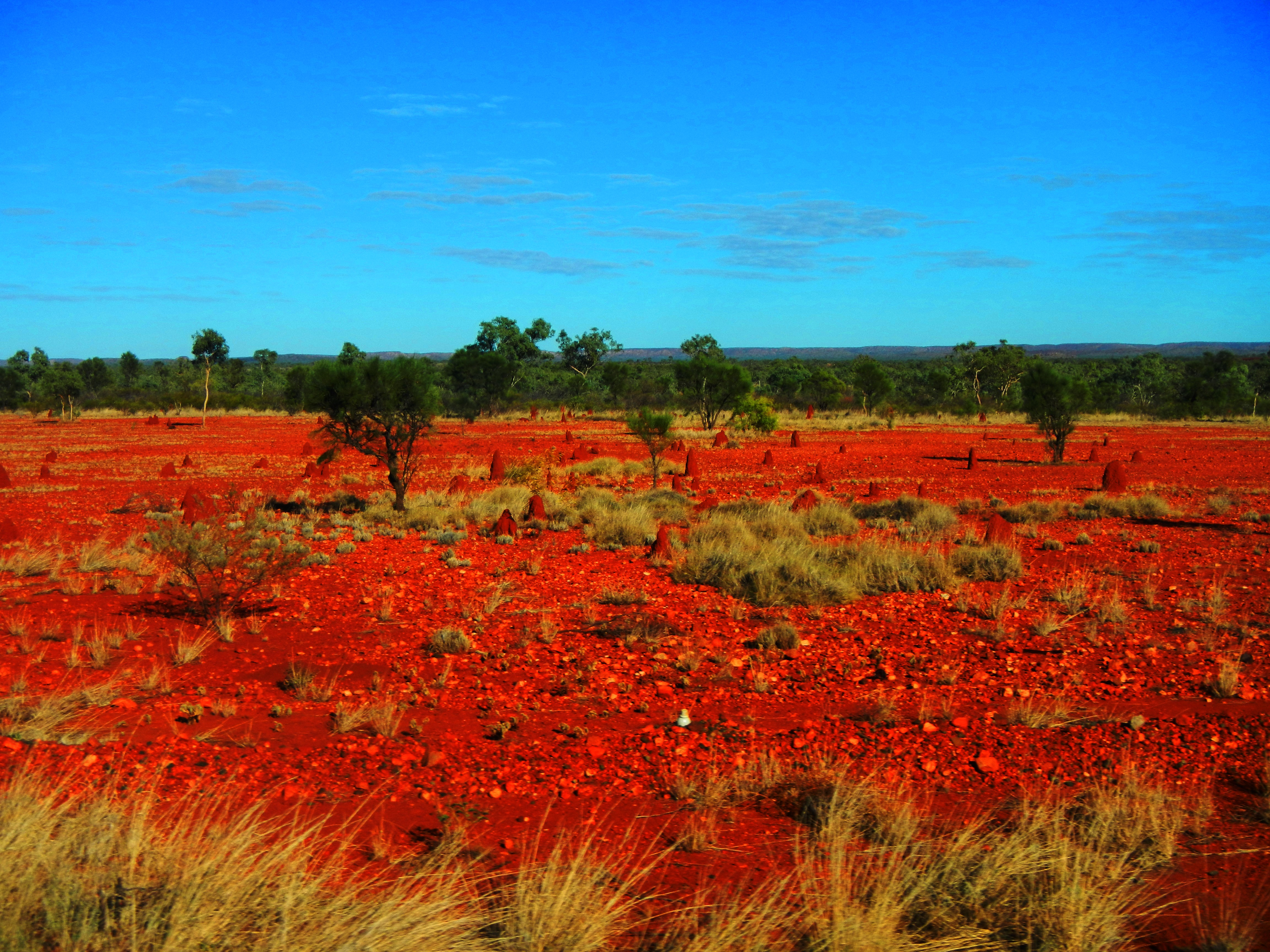
- Ant Hills, Duchess, 2013

- Interactive map of Duchess
- Coordinates: 21.3577°S 139.8641°E
- Country: Australia
- State: Queensland
- LGA: Shire of Cloncurry
- Location: 80.1 km (49.8 mi) SSE of Mount Isa; 134 km (83 mi) SW of Cloncurry; 918 km (570 mi) WSW of Townsville; 1,841 km (1,144 mi) NW of Brisbane
- Established: 1897

Government
  - State electorate: Traeger
  - Federal division: Kennedy

Area
  - Total: 3,629.4 km^{2} (1,401.3 sq mi)

Population
  - Total: 53 (2021 census)
  - Density: 0.01460/km^{2} (0.0378/sq mi)
- Time zone: UTC+10:00 (AEST)
- Postcode: 4825
Localities around Duchess
Mount Isa (locality)	Cloncurry	Kuridala
Waverley	Duchess	Kuridala
Dajarra	Dajarra	Selwyn

Duchess is a rural town and locality in the Shire of Cloncurry, Queensland, Australia. In the 2021 census, the locality of Duchess had a population of 53 people.

== Geography ==
The town is in the east of the locality. The Cloncurry Duchess Road, which is part of the Cloncurry-Dajarra Road, passes through the locality from south to east, passing through the town. The Great Northern railway passes through the locality from east to north-west, passing through the town which is served by the Duchess railway station (21.3556°S 139.8658°E).

Duchess is surrounded by a number of pastoral stations including Mayfield station and Stradbroke station.

The Dajarra railway line passes through the locality.

Butru is a neighbourhood (21.4879°S 139.7239°E) within the locality, which developed around the Butru railway station.

Juenburra is neighbourhood (21.4166°S 139.8166°E) within the locality, which developed around the Juenburra railway station.

Woobera is a neighbourhood (21.4666°S 139.7833°E) within the locality, which developed around the Woobera railway station.

In the north of the locality, there is a watershed separating into three drainage basins. The Leichhardt River and its east branch rise in the north of the locality and flows north into the Gulf of Carpentaria. The Malbon River rises in the north-east of the locality and flows north-east into the Cloncurry River and ultimately into the Flinders River and into the Gulf of Carpentaria. While the Wills Creek, Green Creek and Pilgrim Creek which rise in the south of the locality flow south and into the Bourke River and ultimately into the Georgina River which theoretically flows into Lake Eyre, but only rarely is there sufficient water for this occur.

== History ==
Kalkatunga (also known as Kalkadoon, Kalkadunga, Kalkatungu) is an Australian Aboriginal language. The Kalkatunga language region is North-West Queensland including the local government areas of the City of Mount Isa.

The town's name was derived from the name of the mine, which was named by pastoralist Alexander Kennedy when his son John Peter Kennedy discovered a deposit of copper there in 1897 and led to the founding of the town. (Alexander Kennedy would later be the first passenger on a Qantas plane from Cloncurry.) Duchess was the name or nickname of the Aboriginal consort of pastoralist St John de Satge who was nicknamed "The Duke", who had run away and sought refuge at Kennedy's Calton Downs station. A 1987 map indicates that Duchess was previously named Mairindi.

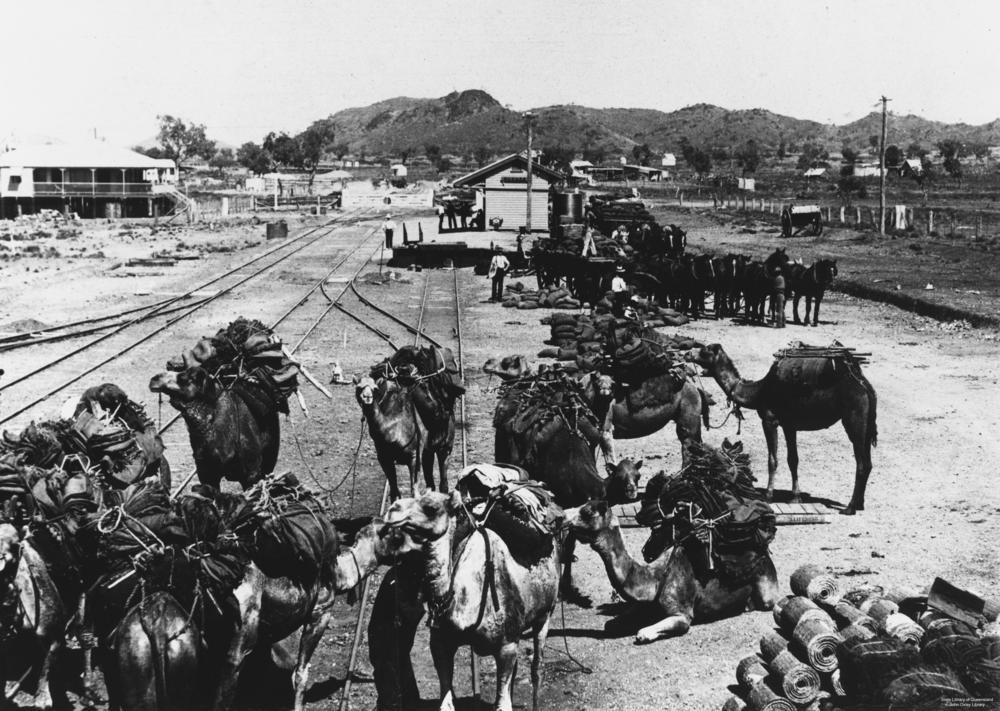
Team of camels at the Duchess Railway Station, circa 1910

Mining in the area lead to negotiations with the government in 1906 about building accessible railway stations. Duchess railway station opened on 21 October 1912 when the Great Northern railway line reached Duchess from Malbon.

In the 1911 census, the town had a population of 397. By 1915 the population boomed to over 1000. By the 1920s, the town's population dropped. At its peak and for a while afterwards, Duchess was home to four pubs, a school, a post office, a train station, and four automobile garages.

The Butru railway station was named by the Queensland Railways Department on 26 July 1915; it is an Aboriginal word referring to the waterhole where the railway line crosses the Wills River. The Dajarra railway line from the town of Duchess reached Butru on 18 December 1915.

The Woobera railway station was named by the Queensland Railways Department on 19 October 1917; it is an Aboriginal word meaning shelter for sleeping.

The Juenburra railway station was named by the Queensland Railways Department on 17 October 1918; it is an Aboriginal word meaning bush fly.

Duchess Provisional School opened on 17 July 1911 and closed on 10-June-83. It became Duchess State School on 1 March 1915. It closed in 1983.

Trekelano State School opened on 9 October 1918. It closed in 1926. It re-opened on 19 July 1936 but closed in 1941.

== Demographics ==
In the 2016 census, the locality of Duchess had a population of 23 people.

In the 2021 census, the locality of Duchess had a population of 53 people.

== Education ==
There are no schools in Duchess. The nearest government primary schools are Happy Valley State School in Happy Valley, Mount Isa, to the north and Dajarra State School in neighbouring Dajarra to the south. The nearest government secondary school is Spinifex State College in Mount Isa, which has its junior campus in Parkside and its senior campus in Pioneer. However, not all parts of Duchess are within range of these schools for a daily commute, so the alternatives are distance education and boarding schools. Spinifex State College has boarding facilities in Healy, Mount Isa.

== Amenities ==
- Duchess Pub

== Transport ==
Preceding station	Queensland Rail	Following station
Long distance rail services
Cloncurry towards Townsville	The Inlander	Mount Isa Terminus
