= Selwyn, Queensland =

Selwyn
- Town
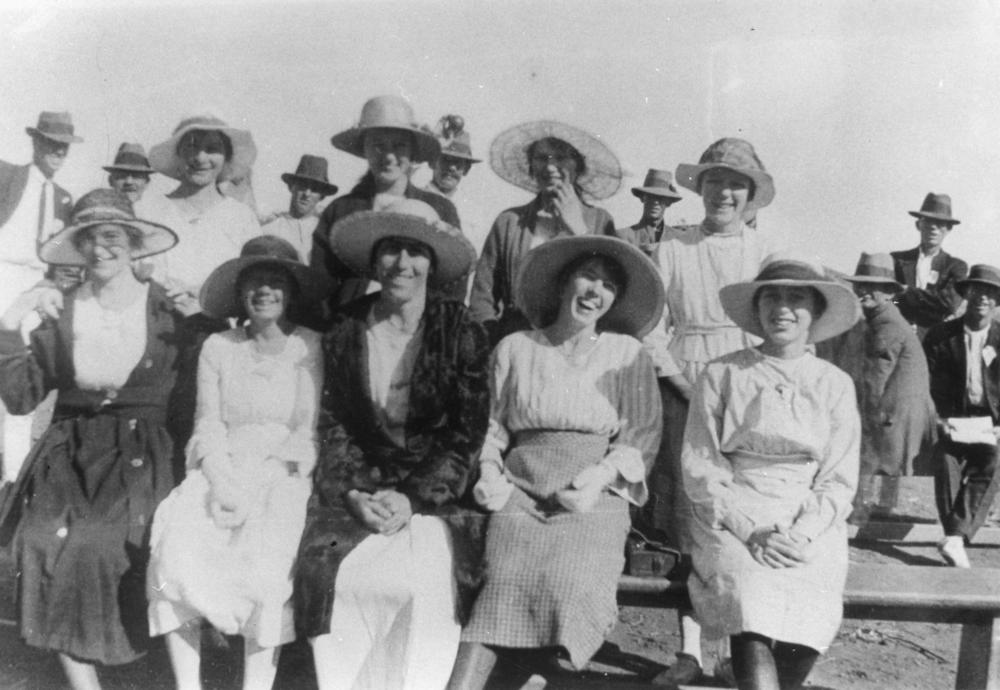
- Ladies enjoying a cricket match at Selwyn, 1921

- Interactive map of Selwyn
- Coordinates: 21.5255°S 140.5019°E
- Country: Australia
- State: Queensland
- LGA: Shire of Cloncurry
- Location: 161 km (100 mi) S of Cloncurry; 260 km (160 mi) SE of Mount Isa; 1,701 km (1,057 mi) NW of Brisbane

Government
  - State electorate: Traeger
  - Federal division: Kennedy

Area
  - Total: 10,504.7 km^{2} (4,055.9 sq mi)

Population
  - Total: 25 (2021 census)
  - Density: 0.00238/km^{2} (0.00616/sq mi)
- Time zone: UTC+10:00 (AEST)
- Postcode: 4823
Localities around Selwyn
Duchess	Kuridala	McKinlay
Dajarra	Selwyn	Middleton
Buckingham	Warenda	Warburton

Selwyn is a rural town and locality in the Shire of Cloncurry, Queensland, Australia. Selwyn is an abandoned former mining town. In the 2021 census, the locality of Selwyn had a population of 25 people.

== Geography ==
The Selwyn Range passes through the north of the locality.

=== Mountains ===
Selwyn has the following mountains (from north to south):

- in the north-east of the locality
  - Mount Tracey (21.4009°S 140.7713°E)
  - Mount Boorama (21.4312°S 140.8103°E)
- in the west of the locality
  - Mount Birnie (21.6168°S 139.9478°E) 450 metres (1,480 ft)
  - Mount Aplin (21.6730°S 139.9297°E) 496 metres (1,627 ft)
  - Mount Murray (21.8209°S 139.9773°E) 368 metres (1,207 ft)
  - Mount Merlin (21.8780°S 140.0104°E) 314 metres (1,030 ft)
  - Phosphate Hill (21.8889°S 139.9864°E)
  - Signal Hill (21.9799°S 140.0489°E) 307 metres (1,007 ft)
  - Swift Hills (22.0579°S 140.0336°E) 310 metres (1,020 ft)
  - Digby Peaks (22.1150°S 140.1343°E) 301 metres (988 ft)

=== Phosphate Hill railway line ===
The Phosphate Hill branch line of the Mount Isa railway line enters the locality from the north-west (Duchess) and runs parallel to the locality's western boundary until Phosphate Hill, the site of the phosphate mine. The stations on the line are (from north to south):

- Mirri railway station (21.7635°S 139.9729°E)
- Phosphate Hill railway station (21.8832°S 139.9776°E)

The Duchess Phosphate Hill Road runs loosely parallel and west of the Phosphate Hill branch line, also terminating at the mine site.

=== Selwyn railway line ===
The former Selwyn railway line had the following railway stations:

- Wontimee railway station (former, 21.3747°S 140.4913°E), named by the Railways Department from 24 September 1920, using an Aboriginal word meaning spring water
- Coppery railway station (former, 21.3833°S 140.5°E), named by Railways Department on 29 October 1912. after the mineral copper which was found in the locality
- Kongula railway station (former, 21.4666°S 140.4833°E), named by the Railways Department from 29 December 1909 by Railways Department, using an Aboriginal word meaning either a grass necklace or a local mountain

== History ==
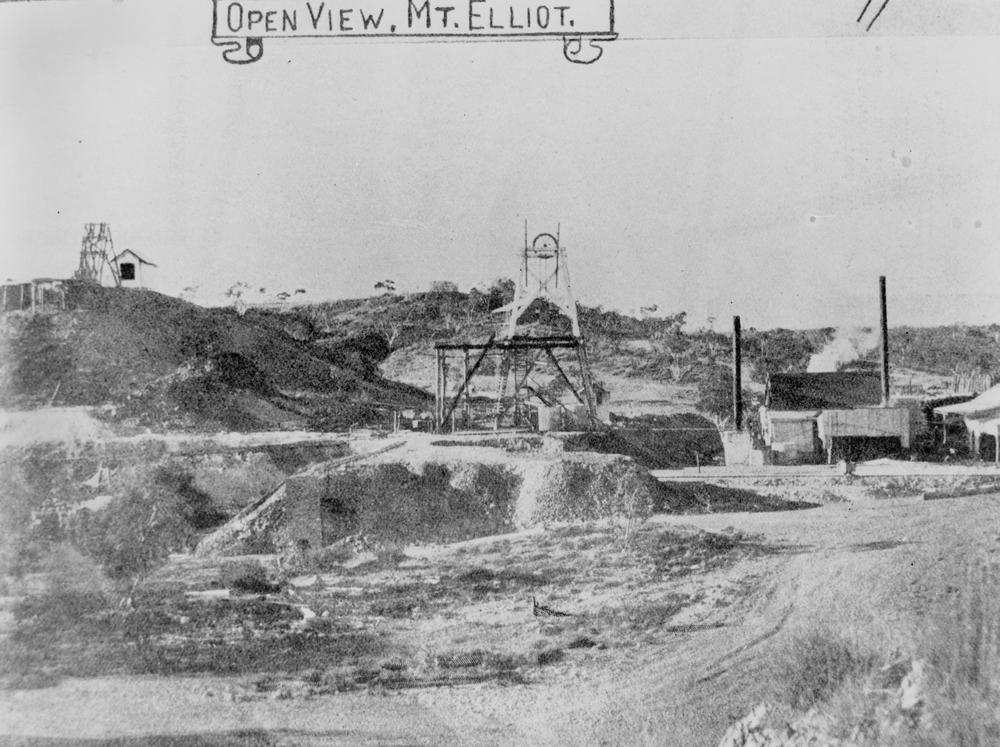
Mount Elliott Mine, 1909

Selwyn takes its name from the Selwyn Range, which was named in turn after Alfred Richard Cecil Selwyn, a geologist who was Director of the Geological Survey of Victoria from 1852 to 1869. It was formerly known as Mount Elliott after the prospector James Elliott who discovered copper and gold in the area in 1889.

Mount Elliott Provisional School opened in 1908. On 1 January 1909, it became Mount Elliott State School. In 1910, the school had 70 students and one teacher and an extra teacher was wanted. In early May 1911, there was still only one teacher with 100 students in a building described as "not large enough for half the number" with the suggestion that typhoid outbreaks might be caused by the school's overcrowding. In late May 1911, the Queensland Government announced that an assistant teacher was expected to arrive soon and that plans were being drawn up for a larger school building. A call for tenders to construct the new school building was advertised in March 1912, with a contract for £1,135 awarded in June 1912. In 1912, it was renamed Selwyn State School. In November 1915, the Selwyn Hotel burned down, killing the school's headteacher who was boarding in the hotel. The school closed circa 1936. In December 1937, the school building was relocated to be used as a school building in Boulia.

On 15 December 1910, the Selwyn railway line opened to service the Hampden and Mount Elliott mines. It was a branch of the Great Northern Railway and ran south from Cloncurry to Selwyn.

Selwyn's population peaked in 1918 with an estimated population of 1500 people with a hospital and four hotels. However, in 1920, copper prices collapsed and, by 1921, only 191 people were still living in Selwyn.

Mount Cobalt Provisional School opened in 1924 and closed in 1926.

The railway line to Selwyn was closed in 1961.

== Demographics ==
In the 2016 census, the locality of Selwyn had a population of 50 people.

In the 2021 census, the locality of Selwyn had a population of 25 people.

== Heritage listings ==
Selwyn has a number of heritage-listed sites, including:

- Mount Elliott Mining Complex (21.5328°S 140.5035°E)

== Education ==
There are no schools in Selwyn. Students in the far west of Selwyn can attend Dajarra State School in neighbouring Dajarra to the west, but it would be too distant for other students in the locality. There are no secondary schools nearby. The alternatives are distance education and boarding school.

== Economy ==
Although the town of Selwyn is now abandoned, the mining and processing of phosphate occurs in the south-west of the locality at Phosphate Hill. The facility employs about 250 people with annual capacity of 975,000 tonnes. The mine is serviced by the on-site gas-powered Phosphate Hill Power Station (21.8788°S 139.9746°E). The mine is serviced by the Phosphate Hill railway station at the terminus of the Phosphate Hill railway line which branches from the Mount Isa railway line at the Flynn railway station.

== Facilities ==
Selwyn Cemetery is to the east of the now-abandoned town of Selwyn (21.5312°S 140.5073°E).

== See also ==
- Mount Elliott mine
- Mount Elliott Company Metallurgical Plant and Mill
