= Kuridala Township site =

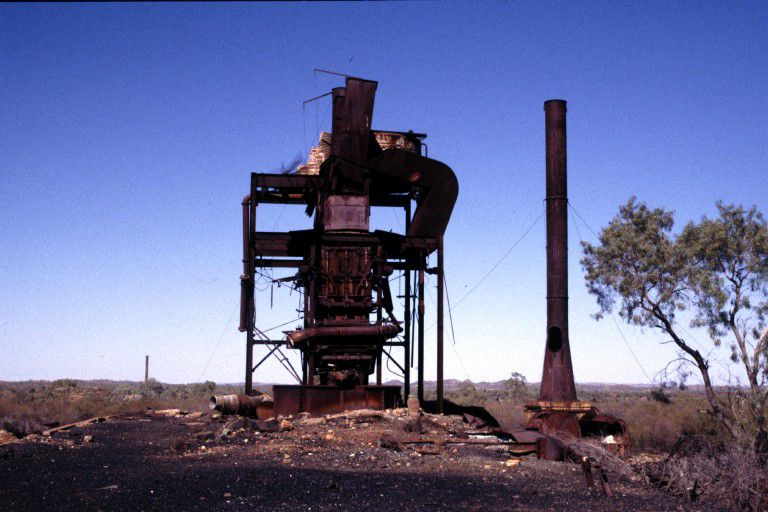
- Hampden Smelter at Kuridala, 2003

- Location within Queensland Location within Australia
- 21.2797°S 140.5072°E
- Location: In the locality of Kuridala, Shire of Cloncurry, Queensland, Australia

History
- Design period: 1900 - 1914 (early 20th century)
- Built: 1880s-1920s

Queensland Heritage Register
- Official name: Kuridala Township, Hampden Smelter and Mining Complex, Hampden Township, Kuridala Smelter, Friezeland Township
- Type: archaeological (landscape)
- Designated: 12 June 2009
- Reference no.: 645604
- Significant period: 1890s-1940s
- Significant components: well, artefact field, tank stand, building foundations/ruins, bore, mullock heap, shaft, machinery/plant/equipment - mining/mineral processing, building foundations/ruins, pump, chimney/chimney stack, boiler room/boiler house, headframe, cemetery, grave marker, burial/grave, grave surrounds/railings, artefact field, engine/generator shed/room / power supply, building foundations/ruins, slag pile/slag heap, chimney/chimney stack, mounting block/stand, furnace, cutting - railway, embankment - railway, artefact field, building foundations/ruins, railway station, formation - railway

Kuridala Township site is a heritage-listed mining camp in the locality of Kuridala, Shire of Cloncurry, Queensland, Australia. It was built from 1880s to 1920s. It is also known as Hampden Township, Hampden Smelter, Kuridala Smelter, and Friezeland Township. It was added to the Queensland Heritage Register on 12 June 2009.

== History ==
Copper was discovered at Kuridala in 1884 and the Hampden mine commenced during the 1890s. A Melbourne syndicate took over operations in 1897 and with increasing development of the mine in 1905–06 the Hampden Cloncurry Limited company was formed. The township was surveyed as Hampden in 1910 (later called Friezland, and finally Kuridala in 1916). The Hampden Smelter operated from 1911 to 1920 with World War I being a particularly prosperous time for the company. After the war the operations and the township declined and the Hampden Cloncurry company ceased to exist in 1928. Tribute mining and further exploration and testing of the ore body has continued from 1932 through to the present day.

The Kuridala Township and Hampden Smelter are located approximately 65 kilometres (40 mi) south of Cloncurry and 345 metres (1,132 ft) above sea level, on an open plain against a background of rugged but picturesque hills.

The Cloncurry copper fields were discovered by Ernest Henry in 1867 but lack of capital and transport combined with low base metal prices precluded any major development. However, rising prices, new discoveries in the region and the promise of a railway combined with an inflow of British capital stimulated development. Additionally, Melbourne based promoters eager to develop another base metal bonanza like Broken Hill led to a resurgence of interest, especially in the Hampden mines.

The copper deposits at Kuridala (initially named Hampden) were discovered by William McPhail and Robert Johnson on their pastoral lease, Eureka, in January 1884. The Hampden mine was held by Fred Gibson in the 1890s and acquired in 1897 by a Melbourne syndicate comprising the "Broken Hillionaires" - William Orr, William Knox and Herman Schlapp. They floated the Hampden Copper Mines N. L. with a capital of £100,000 in £100 shares of which 200 were fully paid up. With this capital they commenced a prospecting and stockpiling program sending specimens to Dapto and Wallaroo for testing. Government Geologist, W.E. Cameron's report on the district in 1900 discouraged investors as he reported that few of the lodes, other than the Hampden Company's main lode at Kuridala, were worth working.

A world price rise in copper in 1905 combined with a government decision in 1906 to extend the Great Northern railway (then connecting Townsville to Richmond) to Cloncurry, stimulated further development. The Hampden Cloncurry Copper Mines Limited was registered in Victoria in March 1906 to acquire the old company's mines. However, the company only had a working capital of £35,000 after distributing vendor's shares and buying the Duchess mines. During this period there were over 20 companies investing similarly on the Cloncurry field.

The township was surveyed by the Queensland Mines Department around 1910 and was first known as Hampden after the mines discovered in the 1880s. By 1912 it was called Friezland, however was officially renamed Kuridala in October 1916 to minimise confusion with another settlement in Queensland. The reason for this change was considered to be linked to German names being unpopular at the outbreak of World War I.

Hampden Cloncurry Copper Mines Limited and its competitor, Mount Elliott, formed a special company in 1908 to finance and construct the railway extension from Cloncurry through Malbon, to Kuridala and Mount Elliott. The company reconstructed in July 1909 by increasing its capitalisation, and concluding arrangements for a debenture issue to be secured against its proposed smelters. Its smelters were not fired until March 1911 and over the next three years 85,266 long tons (86,634 t) of ore were treated with an initial dividend of £140,000 being declared in 1913. In one month in 1915 the Hampden Smelter produced 813 long tons (826 t) of copper, an Australian record at that time.

Concern over the dwindling reserves of high grade ore led to William Henry Corbould, the general manager of Mount Elliott mines, negotiating an amalgamation with Hampden Cloncurry to halt the fierce rivalry. But the latter was uninterested having consolidated its prospects in 1911 by acquiring many promising mines in the region, and enlarging its smelters and erecting new converters. In 1913, following a fire in the Hampden Consol's mine, Corbould convinced his London directors to reopen negotiations for a joint venture in the northern section of the field which still awaited a railway. Although Corbould and Huntley, the Hampden Cloncurry general manager, inspected many properties, the proposal lapsed.

The railway reached the township by 1910. A sanitary system was installed in 1911, after a four-month typhoid epidemic, and a hospital erected by 1913, run by Dr. Old. It was described as the best and most modern hospital in the northwest. At its height the town supported six hotels, five stores, four billiard saloons, three dance halls and a cinema, two ice works and one aerated waters factory, and Chinese gardens along the creek.There were also drapers, fruiterer, butcher, baker, timber merchant, garage, four churches, police station, court house, post office, banks and a school with up to 280 pupils. A cyclone in December 1918 damaged the town and wrecked part of the powerhouse and smelter.

A comprehensive description of the plant and operations of the Kuridala Hampden mines and smelters was given by the Cloncurry mining warden in the Queensland Government Mining Journal of 14 September 1912. Ore from other company-owned mines (Duchess, Happy Salmon, MacGregor and Trekelano) was railed in via a 1.2-kilometre (0.75 mi) branch line to the reduction plant bins, while the heavy pyrites ore from the Hampden mines was separated at the main shaft into coarse and fine products and conveyed to separate 1,500-long-ton (1,500 t) capacity bins over a standard gauge railway to the plant.

A central power plant was installed with three separate Dowson pressure gas plants powered by three tandem type Kynoch gas engines of 320 horsepower (240 kW) and two duplex type Hornsby gas engines of 200 horsepower (150 kW). Two Swedish General Electric Company generators of 1,250 kilowatts (1,680 hp) and 56 kilowatts (75 hp) running at 460 volts, supplied electricity to the machines in the works, fitting shops and mine pumps. Electric light for the mine and works was supplied by a British Thompson-Houston generator of 42 kilowatts (56 hp), running at 420 volts. The fuel used in the gas producers was bituminous coal, coke or charcoal, made locally in the retorts. The reduction plant consisted of two water-jacket furnaces, 2.1 by 1 metre (6 ft 11 in by 3 ft 3 in) and 4.2 by 1 metre (13.8 by 3.3 ft), with dust chambers and a 52-metre (171 ft) high steel stack. There were two electrically driven converter vessels, each 3.2 by 2.3 metres (10.5 by 7.5 ft). The molten product ran into a 3.7-metre (12 ft) diameter forehearth, while the slag was drawn off into double ton slag pots, run to the dump over 3-foot (0.91 m) gauge, 42-pound (19 kg) steel rail tracks. The copper was delivered from the forehearth to the converters. A 1.06-metre (3 ft 6 in) gauge track ran under the converters and carried the copper mould cars to the cleaning and shipping shed, at the end of which was the siding for railing out the cakes of blister copper.

The war conferred four years of prosperity on the Cloncurry district despite marketing, transport and labour difficulties. The Hampden Cloncurry Company declared liberal dividends during 1915–18: £40,000, £140,000, £52,500 and £35,000 making a total disbursement since commencing operations of £437,500. Its smelters treated over a quarter of a million tons of ore in this period, averaging over 70,000 long tons (71,000 t) annually. The company built light railways to its mines (e.g. Wee MacGregor railway and Trekelano) to ensure regular ore supplies and to reduce transport costs. In order to improve its ore treatment, Hampden Cloncurry installed a concentration plant in 1917. In 1918 an Edwards furnace was erected to pre-roast fine sulphide concentrates from the mill before smelting.

The dropping of the copper price control by the British government in 1918 forced the company into difficulties. Smelting was postponed until September 1919 and the company lost heavily during the next season and had to rely on ores from the Trekelano mine. Its smelter treated 69,598 long tons (70,715 t) of ore in 1920, but the company was forced to halt all operations after the Commonwealth Bank withdrew funds on copper awaiting export.

Companies and mines turned to the Theodore Labor Government for assistance but they were unsympathetic to the companies, even though they alone had the capacity to revive the Cloncurry field. More negotiations for amalgamation occurred in 1925 but failed, and in 1926 Hampden Cloncurry offered its assets for sale by tender and Mount Elliott acquired them all except for the Trekelano mine. The company was de-listed in 1928.

The rise and decline of the township reflected the company's fortunes. In 1913 there were 1,500 people increasing to 2,000 by 1920, but by 1924 this had declined to 800. With the rise of Mount Isa, Kaiser's bakehouse, the hospital, courthouse, one ice works and picture theatre, moved there in 1923 followed by Boyds' Hampden Hotel (renamed the Argent) in 1924. Other buildings including the police residence and Clerk of Petty Sessions house were moved to Cloncurry.

In its nine years of smelting Hampden Cloncurry had been one of Australia's largest mining companies producing 50,800 long tons (51,600 t) of copper (compared with Mount Elliott's 27,000), 21,000 ounces (600,000 g) of gold and 381,000 ounces (10,800,000 g) of silver. A more permanent achievement was its part in creating the metal fabricating company, Metal Manufacturers Limited, of which it was one of the four founders in 1916. Much of the money which built their Port Kembla works into one of the country's largest manufacturers came from the now derelict smelters in north-west Queensland.

In 1942 Mount Isa Mines bought the Kuridala Smelters for £800 and used parts to construct a copper furnace which commenced operating in April 1943 in response to wartime demands. The Tunny family continued to live at Kuridala as tributers on the Hampden and Consol mines from 1932 until 1969 and worked the mines down to 15.25 metres (50.0 ft). A post office operated until 1975 and the last inhabitant, Lizzy Belch, moved into Cloncurry about 1982.

Further exploration and testing of the Kuridala ore body has occurred from 1948 up until the present with activities being undertaking by Mount Isa Mines, Broken Hill South, Enterprise Exploration, Marshall and James Boyd, Australian Selection, Kennecott Exploration, Carpentaria Exploration, Metana Minerals, A.M. Metcalfe, Dampier Mining Co Ltd, Newmont Pty Ltd, Australian Anglo American, Era South Pacific Pty Ltd, CRA Exploration Pty Ltd, BHP Minerals Ltd, Metana Minerals and Matrix Metals Ltd.

== Description ==
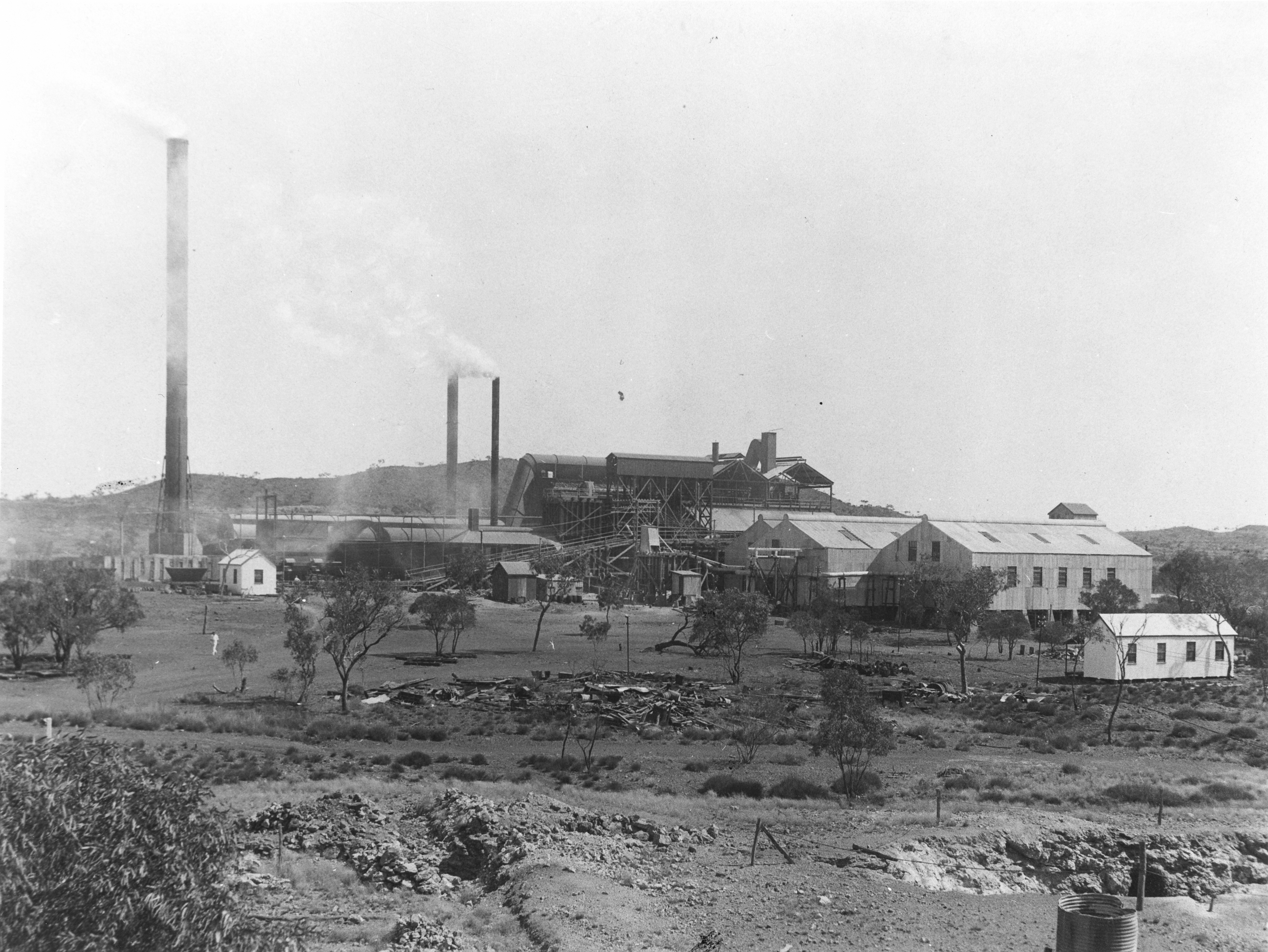
Mine buildings and smelter, Kuridala, 1916

=== Town area ===
The township site, with surviving foundations and archaeological evidence of commercial and residential buildings and activities, covers an area of approximately 1.5 kilometres (0.93 mi) (north-south) by 1.2 kilometres (0.75 mi) (east-west). The surveyed town site runs roughly parallel with, and on the eastern side of, the Hampden line of reef. Evidence of commercial buildings is present in the south-west corner of the town site between a stock bore east of the Hampden Consol chimney and an early town well. Foundations and concrete surfaces remain for the bakery, hotel/store, and butcher's shop and other unidentified premises. The skating rink, police station, mine manager's house and hospital have also been identified archaeologically. Residential sites generally appear as cleared earth surfaces with ironstone or white quartz edging. The hospital site is located on a small hill to the east and contains a large iron water tank base and cast iron oven. A wide range of domestic artefacts are in evidence across the town area. These include food containers such as glass bottles, ceramic tableware, and metal tins for products from kerosene and matches to sardines and tobacco.

=== Cemetery ===
The cemetery is situated towards the southern end of the site, west of the Hampden line of reef. The cemetery is clearly marked and was re- fenced in 1988–89. There are two gazetted cemetery reserves adjacent to the township (Lots 3SW23 and 5SW25). The actual cemetery is located 400 metres (1,300 ft) east of Lot 5SW25, and is not located within the boundaries of either of the gazetted cemetery areas. There are over 360 graves which can be identified in the cemetery consisting of 18 rows with 20 graves per row. Many graves have headstones with 40 being marked and dating from 1909 to 1920. Most headstones are by Melrose and Fenwick, Townsville. Some graves have railings but lack identification of the person buried. Many grave boundaries are marked by early 20th Century cast iron beds with full or half testers. Smaller framed beds denote children's or infants' graves. Several grave crosses have been fashioned from kerosene tins. Several graves were noted in 1989 as having dilapidated wooden surrounds. Other graves are visible only from soil disturbance, while it is possible there are still others which are not so clearly visible.

=== Railway station and railway line ===
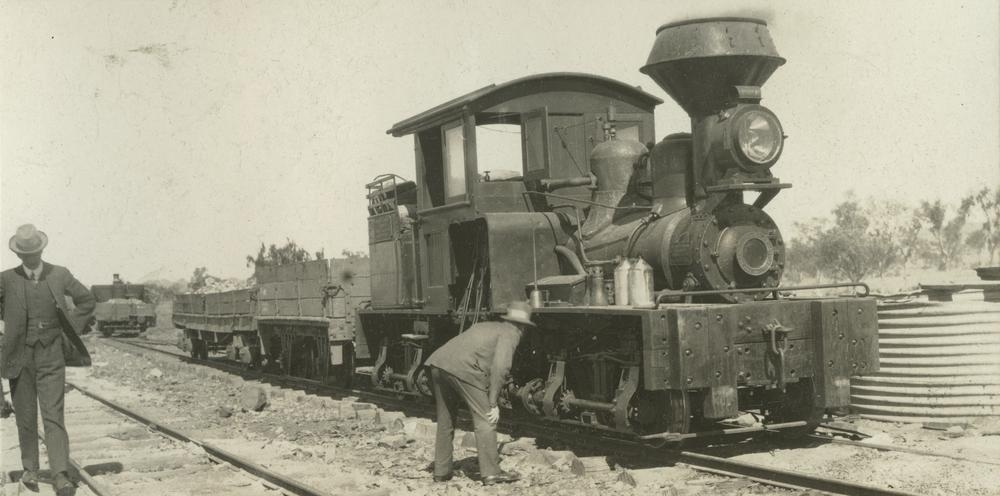
Steam Locomotive at the Hampden Smelters, 1912

The railway station site is immediately north of the cemetery at the junction of the smelter spur line. The station office is identified by a cement rendered surface with other foundations and tank bases within a 30-metre (98 ft) radius. Timber sleepers are still in place along sections of the railway formation. Embankments and cuttings still identify the route of the Cloncurry-Kuridala railway line and there is a wide range of archaeological material associated with the station and the line still present.

=== Other settlement and industrial sites ===
A wide range of other settlement sites outside the confines of the planned township occur across the landscape. There is an apparent randomness to the sites; however it is likely that there was far more method in site selection than is presently apparent. Examples of these sites include deposits of bottle glass, ceramic vessel fragments, metal artefacts, bricks and other domestic material.

=== Smelter ===
The remains of the smelter-works includes a blast furnace, concrete engine mounts and an iron chimney. A large, well-formed slag dump extends northward from the smelter. Adjacent to the furnace is a second iron chimney, powerhouse foundations and roasting furnace. The steel plate chimneys and parts of the smelter are all heavily rusted and the foundations are showing signs of heavy cracking.

=== Mine areas ===
Foundations and remnants of four early mines occur along the north- south line of the Hampden reef. Northernmost is the Hampden No. 2 containing a multi-tube boiler, beam pump and waster material. Logs remain at the former sawmill site south of Hampden No. 2. Further south and about 200 metres (660 ft) east of the smelter is the Hampden No.1 mine and plant foundations at the base of a high tailings dump. This mine contains the largest group of foundations including crusher and winch mounts. A beam pump arm is located at the collar of the main shaft. Further south, at the Hampden No. 3 shaft, remains include a headframe, winder house, waste heaps and boiler on a brick mounting. The bricks are manufactured from slag demonstrating an innovative and rare use of recycled slag. The Hampden Consol mine to the south retains an iron chimney on a rendered brick base which is inscribed AD 1913. Evidence at the site includes engine house remains, foundations and waste heaps. Other shafts and underground operations are likely to remain where there is the existence of shafts and levels. These remnants are likely to provide useful information on tunnelling techniques, the use of pit props, and design of ore hauling mechanisms.

== Heritage listing ==
Kuridala Township, Hampden Smelter and Mining Complex was listed on the Queensland Heritage Register on 12 June 2009 having satisfied the following criteria.

The Kuridala Township, Hampden Smelter and Mining Complex has the potential to reveal important information about Queensland's history including a better understanding of copper mining practices and the pattern of settlement in North Queensland. The Kuridala complex was one of the first of a cluster of significant copper mining interests in the rich mineral field near Cloncurry.

Kuridala Township, Hampden Smelter and Mining Complex features extensive archaeological evidence relating to a wide range of mining activities. The early smelter works are the most complete works of this type in North Queensland. The Hampden Smelter is equipped with a rare, early water-jacket blast furnace, which is now unique as the only surviving example of its type in Queensland. A large, intact and well-formed slag dump at the site is second only in size to the dump at Chillagoe smelters. Archaeological examination of the smelter works will provide an understanding of the technology and practices in early copper processing in Queensland.

Archaeological investigations of the township area of Kuridala will provide answers to a range of questions relating to the social dynamics of the community and its establishment, development, interaction, and decline. Analysis of the archaeological artefacts particularly in domestic contexts will provide information on issues such as ethnicity, gender and the daily lives of the residents of Kuridala. The remains of the township will provide information on the pattern and spatial organisation of the settlement, and have the potential to answer questions about the isolation and integration of communities and of community identity. An understanding of the collective experiences of isolated mining communities may also be gained through further research into the site, particularly given the level of intra-site complexity.

The cemetery, one of the largest with mining associations in North Queensland, has the potential to provide further information about the community. Analysis of the types and styles of burials and grave markers, the layout and organisation of the cemetery, and the information from the grave markers about those individuals buried, has the potential to reveal information on such research questions as ethnicity, religion and social division within the community. Archaeological analysis of the remains of those buried in the cemetery also has the potential to reveal details of the health and living conditions of the residents of the township.

Given the isolated nature of the community and its distance from established centres of regulation, examination of the archaeological evidence may shed light on disparities between what was regulated or documented and what actually occurred at the site. For example, as identified during previous archaeological surveys of the site in 1989 and 1995, the town plan shows neat streets to the east of the mines and smelter and southwest of the Hampden consol, but the archaeological evidence shows domestic settlement extending to the south, in isolated pockets to the north of the smelter and west of the mines.

The association of the township and industrial areas at the Kuridala complex also provides for comparative and complementary research into other copper mining operations with associated township remains in North Queensland, including Mount Cuthbert Township and Kalkadoon Mine and Mount Elliott Smelter and Selwyn Township.

Archaeological investigations at the former Kuridala Township, Hampden Smelter and Mining Complex also have potential to answer important research questions including but not limited to labour relations, class, and capitalism.
