= Dajarra and Selwyn railway lines =

Technical
- Track gauge: 3 ft 6 in (1,067 mm)

Dajarra and Selwyn Branch Railways were lines in north-west Queensland, Australia. Along with the Mount Cuthbert and Dobbyn Branch Railways, they were essentially built to tap large deposits of copper discovered in the Cloncurry region.

== History ==
Construction of the Selwyn Branch began in 1909. The line ran about 50 kilometres south from Cloncurry railway station (20.7143°S 140.5174°E) to Malbon railway station (21.0722°S 140.3002°E) with sidings built enroute at Dolomite (20.7550°S 140.4414°E), Marimo (20.8085°S 140.4134°E), Mitakoodi (20.9417°S 140.3083°E) and Marraba (20.9868°S 140.2998°E) From there it continued south to the Hampden mine and opened on 11 June 1910. The fledgling township was first named Gulatten, then Hampden, then for a brief time Friezland before finally being renamed in 1916 as Kuridala (an Aboriginal word indicating eagle hawk). An extension further south to the Mount Elliott mine at Selwyn opened on 15 December 1910 (along with the Selwyn Range named after Alfred Selwyn, Director of the Geological Survey of Victoria). Smelted copper was railed east and coking coal on return journeys. Cattle and coke also exchanged trips. Falling copper prices forced the closure of the Mount Elliott and Hampden smelters in 1919 and 1920 respectively. The branch continued to operate at a slow pace until it was closed in 1961. Road transport no doubt squeezed out the cattle market.

The Dajarra branch ran from Malbon in a south-westerly direction to the small town of Dajarra. Its construction served two purposes. It would immediately provide access to additional copper deposits, and later could contribute to the grand plan to link Sydney and Darwin by inland rail and also be linked to partially built branch lines from Brisbane, Rockhampton and Townsville on Queensland's east coast. From 1911, some 100 kilometres of the line was surveyed from Malbon to Sulieman's Creek near Dajarra where it would connect to the proposed inland route.

Construction of a 58 kilometre section to the Duchess copper mine began in 1911. Copper was discovered there in 1897 and the Queensland Railways Department adopted Duchess as the station name. Tiny sidings enroute included Kundora (21.1178°S 140.2515°E), Devoncourt (formerly Macgregor Junction) (21.1394°S 140.2075°E), Wammutta (21.1756°S 140.1461°E), Dronfield (21.2247°S 140.0419°E) and Bungalien (21.3006°S 139.9811°E). Even though ore was hauled earlier in the year, the line officially opened on 21 October 1912. A short 20 kilometre extension took the line via Juenburra and Woobera to Wills River (possibly named after the explorer William John Wills) and on 18 December 1915 it opened to nearby Butru (an Aboriginal word indicating waterhole where the line crossed Wills River). The balance of the line opened on 16 April 1917 to Carbine Creek renamed Dajarra (reportedly an Aboriginal word indicating isolated mountain nearby). Although substantial construction work began beyond Dajarra towards Camooweal, it was never completed. Traffic on the line between Malbon and Duchess was particularly brisk as it included ore shipped via a private railway from Devoncourt north to Ballara and via a spur line from Juenburra near Duchess south to Trekelano.

In 1923 vast silver and lead deposits were discovered at Mount Isa 150 kilometres by road to the north of Dajarra. More business followed in 1929 when Duchess was connected by rail to Mount Isa. So far as Dajarra was concerned, a weekly mixed train plied the route from Cloncurry and Dajarra gradually became one of the world's largest railheads for cattle transported to eastern meatworks.

Supplies from Ballara quickly dwindled and the Trekelano spur lasted until 1943. Competing road transport eventually captured the cattle market and Dajarra railway station (21.6965°S 139.5139°E) closed (the last train departed Dajarra in 1988) when the line from Duchess closed on 1 January 1994. The grand plan of the inland rail link did not eventuate. However, in recent years a plan has been floated to link Queensland with the Northern Territory via Mount Isa and Camooweal in Queensland to the Adelaide-Darwin railway route in the Northern Territory.
