= Selwyn Range (Australia) =

Mountain range in Australia

- Location within Australia

Highest point
- Coordinates: 21°31′S 140°30′E

Geography
- Country: Australia
- State: Queensland

For the Selwyn Range in the Canadian Rockies, see: Selwyn Range (Canada). Note also the Selwyn Mountains on the border between the Yukon and Northwest Territories in Canada.

The Selwyn Range (also known as the Isa Highlands) is a rugged mountain range near Mount Isa and Cloncurry in north-west Queensland, Australia, composed largely of Proterozoic metamorphic rocks. It is drained in the north by the Williams and Fullarton rivers, which run into the Gulf of Carpentaria, and in the south by the McKinlay River and its tributary, Boorama Creek which drain also into the Gulf of Carpentaria. The area is heavily mineralised, containing copper, gold, lead, and zinc, and is important for mining.

The Yulluna people are officially recognised as the Native Title holders of the land to the south and west of the Selwyn Ranges.

The climate of the Selwyn Range is tropical, monsoonal and semi-arid, with an erratic, mainly summer, annual rainfall of 380 mm. Vegetation cover is low eucalypt woodland and spinifex grassland.

The archaeological site of Cuckadoo 1 can be found in the southern Selwyn Ranges. This site was excavated by a team led by Professor Iain Davidson (then of the University of New England), and produced the first known Pleistocene radiocarbon age determinations for the Australian arid zone.
