= Malbon, Queensland =

Malbon Kuridala, Queensland
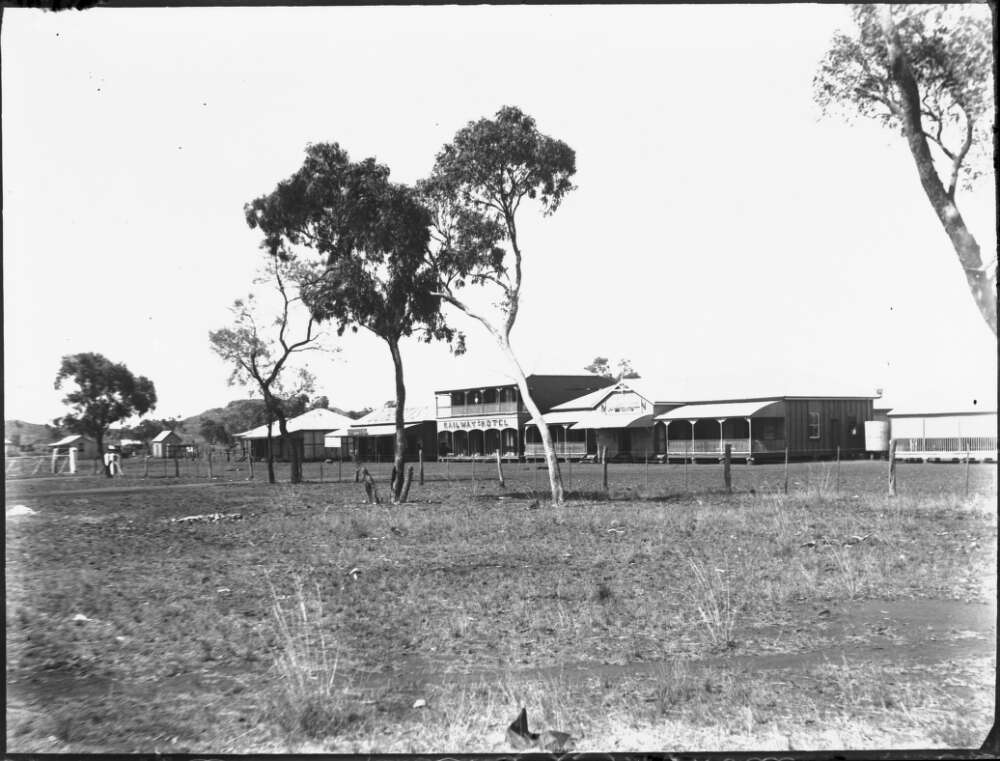
- Streetscape, Malbon, circa 1940

- Coordinates: 21.0741°S 140.3013°E
- Postcode(s): 4824
- Time zone: AEST (UTC+10:00)
- Location: 19.3 km (12 mi) NE of Kuridala; 57.7 km (36 mi) SW of Cloncurry; 157 km (98 mi) SE of Mount Isa; 841 km (523 mi) WSW of Townsville; 1,764 km (1,096 mi) NW of Brisbane
- LGA(s): Shire of Cloncurry
- State electorate(s): Traeger
- Federal division(s): Kennedy

Malbon is a town in the locality of Kuridala in the Shire of Cloncurry, Queensland, Australia.

== History ==
The Town of Malbon is shown on a 1910 survey plan.

Malbon Provisional School opened on 7 November 1911. It became Malbon State School on 1 June 1916. It closed on 8 August 1969. The school was located at the southern end of town on the Malbon Selwyn Road (21.0754°S 140.3019°E).
