= Mount Cuthbert and Dobbyn railway lines =

Former railway line in Queensland, Australia

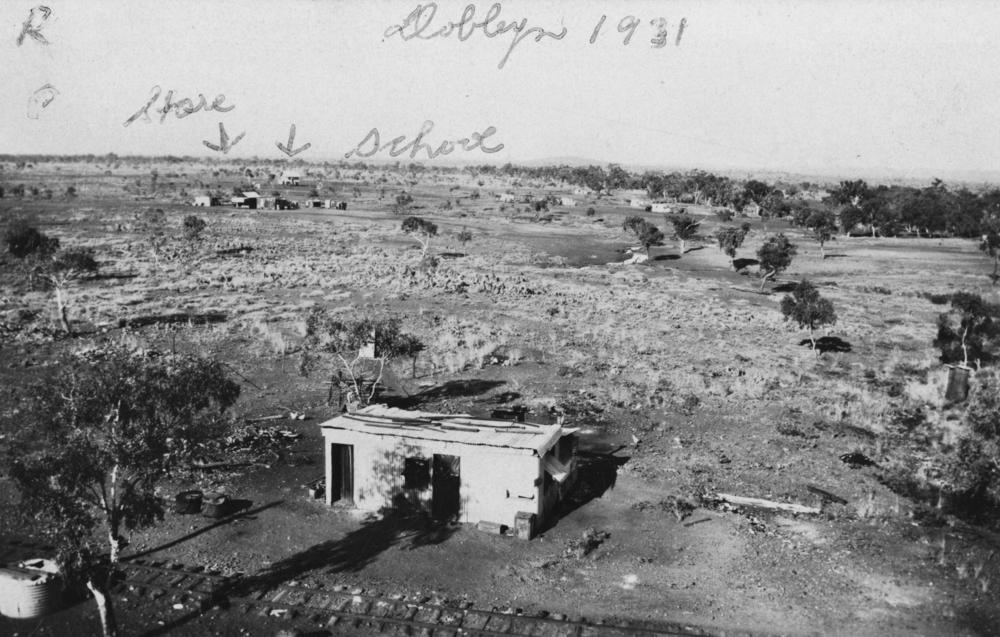
Dobbyn in the early 1930s with the railway track in the foreground, early 1930s

Mount Cuthbert and Dobbyn railway lines were built in the early 1900s to support the mining industry in the Cloncurry area, Queensland, Australia.

== Geography ==
Mount Cuthbert is 100 kilometres (62 mi) north-west of Cloncurry, Queensland, Australia (19.989°S 139.919°E).

Cloncurry was named by the explorer Robert O'Hara Burke after Lady Cloncurry, an Irish friend. Copper mining between 1910 and 1920 boosted its population to over seven thousand people. Mining output attracted listings on both the Melbourne and London stock exchanges. Three companies dominated the industry: Hampden-Cloncurry Cooper Mines Limited, Mount Elliot Limited, and Mount Cuthbert No Liability. Germany was the major customer until 1914.

Mount Cuthbert was a copper mining town, booming in 1918, when Pugh's Almanac Queensland Directory estimated Mount Cuthbert's population at 750.

In its heyday, it recorded six boarding houses, a hotel, a racing club and several stores in the town. Mount Cuthbert's population quickly declined mainly due to the global collapse of the copper market. Mount Cuthbert in the 1921 census had population of only 267 and by 1924 Pugh's notes that most storekeepers had left. The Railway branch line to Mount Cuthbert was closed in 1949.

== Mount Cuthbert and Dobbyn branch railways ==
State Parliament approved a 68 kilometres (42 mi) branch railway from Cloncurry to Koolamarra in late 1911. Construction did not commence until late 1912 and the line did not open until 16 November 1914. Koolamarra (formerly Longamundi) was then the terminus.

The line to Mount Cuthbert was not officially opened until 1 September 1916. En route it passed through Kajabbi (apparently derived from an Aboriginal word indicating a kite hawk) and Oona (formerly named "Kalkadoon"). Rail traffic was heavy because firewood was conveyed to Mount Cuthbert to fuel smelters, and copper was railed east to the Queensland coast.

Further mines were located a short distance to the north-east of Mount Cuthbert around Dobbyn. A 33 kilometres (21 mi) extension from Oona to Dobbyn opened on 21 May 1917 so that additional copper could be accessed. Spur lines were built to the Orphan and Excelsior mines.

Dobbyn was the railhead for Burketown, several hundred kilometres to the north near the Gulf of Carpentaria. An approved 80 kilometres (50 mi) extension towards Burketown was not built. A weekly train service sufficed after copper prices slumped in the 1920s. The Oona to Mount Cuthbert section closed on 8 December 1949, and the Kajabbi to Dobbyn section closed on 1 July 1961.

Beef cattle were railed from Kajabbi and Koolamarra to Cloncurry but, as road transport gradually took over, that service ceased in the late 1980s. The line officially closed on 1 January 1994.

== Today ==
Mount Cuthbert region still had copper. With roads and developing mining techniques, the copper of Mount Cuthbert found renewed interest in 2009. Cape Lambert secured Queensland copper company Matrix Metals, including a mine and a copper cathode plant at Mount Cuthbert.

== See also ==
- Mount Elliott mine
- Mount Elliott Mining Complex
- Mount Elliott Company Metallurgical Plant and Mill

== Bibliography ==
- K. H. Kennedy, ed, Readings in north Queensland mining history, vol 1, Townsville, History Department, James Cook University, 1980
- Geoffrey Blainey, Mines in the spinifex, Sydney, Angus and Robertson, 1960
- Queensland Place Names, Department of Environment & Resource Management
- "Triumph of Narrow Gauge: A History of Queensland Railways" by John Kerr 1990 Boolarong Press, Brisbane
