= Dobbyn, Queensland =

Former copper mining town in Queensland, Australia

Dobbyn
- Town
- Coordinates: 19.7937°S 140.0022°E
- Country: Australia
- State: Queensland
- City: Three Rivers
- LGA: Shire of Cloncurry
- Location: 133 km (83 mi) NNW of Cloncurry; 155 km (96 mi) NE of Mount Isa; 917 km (570 mi) W of Townsville; 1,839 km (1,143 mi) NW of Brisbane

Government
  - State electorate: Traeger
  - Federal division: Kennedy
- Time zone: UTC+10:00 (AEST)
- Postcode: 4824

Dobbyn is a ghost town and former copper mine in the locality of Three Rivers, Shire of Cloncurry, Queensland, Australia. Events at a town mine resulted in short-lived state legislation in 1931 by the premier, A. E. Moore.

The nearest town is Kajabbi 26 kilometres (16 mi) to the south, and is about 115 kilometres (71 mi) km NWN of Cloncurry. The adjacent Coppermine Creek is a tributary to the north-flowing Leichhardt River to Burketown. At 185 metres (607 ft) height, Mount Henry is south-west of the town, 45 metres (148 ft) above the landscape.

== Name origin ==
The name origins of the mine-cum-township are undetermined, and was recorded initially as Dobbin and later, Dobbyn. Earliest newspaper references name the mine rather than a locale or cattle property. Dobbin's Creek was likely named for the mine and not a person, and renamed as Coppermine Creek later. A name change was occurring by 1918 where Pugh's Almanac had the map label as "Dobbin" but the country guide entry as "Dobbyn". By 1920 all references were to "Dobbyn".

Dobbin(s) and Dobbyn(s) are both surnames, and recorded in Queensland in the late-1800s. Separately dobbins were trolleys used with railway cuttings and mining.

== Settlement ==
The Dobbyn area was first settled by the Kalkadoon First Nations people.

In the 1880s copper ore was discovered in the Cloncurry area, and the 1890s in the Dobbyn area. The later introduction of railway lines to transport the ore resulted in a greater influx of miners and associated services.

Town establishment

The town was officially established in 1916. The main street, running north-south, was named Kitchener Street, the first eastern parallel street, French Street, and the second, Haig Street. The street closest to and parallel to Coppermine Creek was Orphan Road, and going parallel and north, Kay Street, Hamilton Street, and Joffre Street; the patriotic names relating to the military personnel involved in World War I which was occurring at the time.

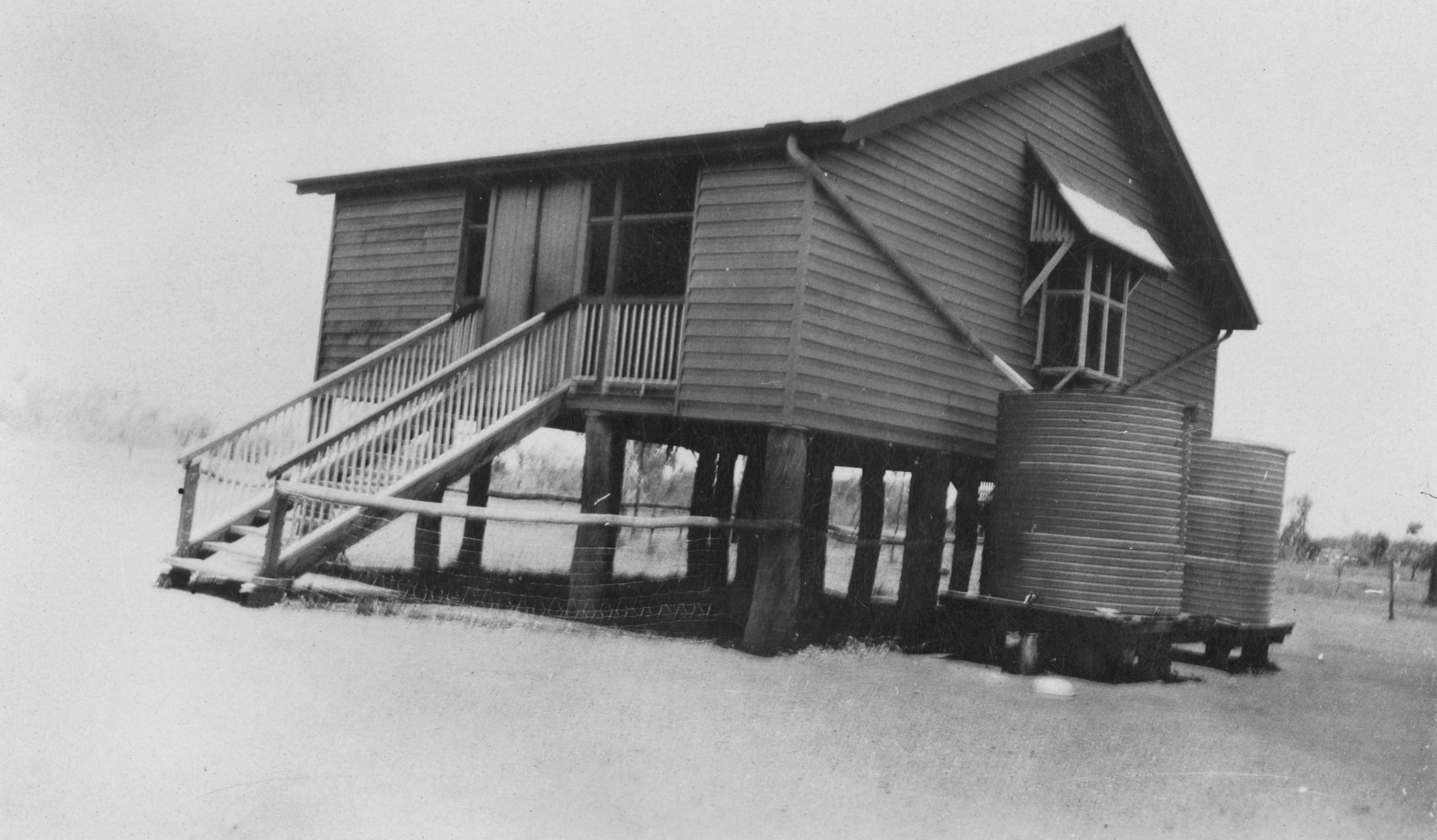
Dobbyn State School also used as the local dance hall, 1931

The Dobbyn State School was opened in 1918. At this time, the postmaster was P. J. Conway, who was also noted as the savings bank agent for the Dobbin Mine [sic] in 1919. In 1919 there was also one police constable and one police tracker.

A Cloncurry–Oonah–Mount Cuthbert railway line was supported in 1914, and established by 1916. The Oonah/Kalkadoon–Mount Oxide (via Dobbyn) extension had been proposed in December 1916, and would require funding from London. The Mount Cuthbert and Dobbyn railway lines was established by 1917. The Cloncurry–Dobbyn line assisted the mines and the town. By 1919 it was proposed to extend the Cloncurry–Dobbyn line to Burketown at the Gulf of Carpentaria, towards Mount Oxide, and Gregory Downs station. It was countered a line to Karumba would be cheaper.

In the early 1930s, the Dobbyn Cricket Club would compete in Kajabbi against the southern Quamby team. The sport of tennis was also enjoyed. Dances and balls were part of the social scene. Mid-1931 saw the suggestion of creating a race club.

Residents felt isolated from greater society occasionally, but rains would isolate the area for food supplies and other products, whether by horse or motor vehicle. Coppermine Creek, Mistake Creek, and the Leichhardt River crossings could become impassible.

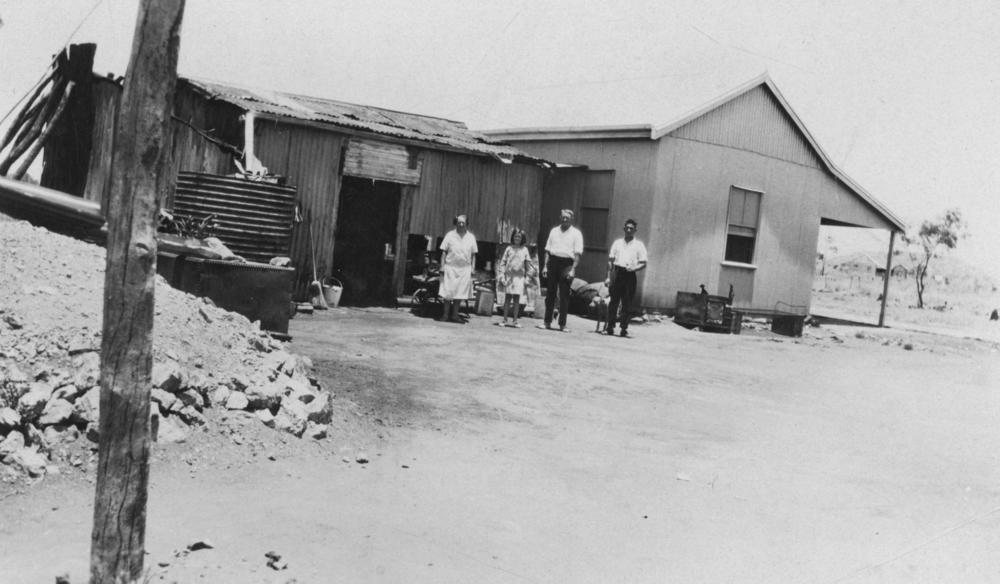
Dobbyn general store (left side) and hotel (right side), 1931

The one public hotel was run in 1919 by Norman Sadd, by J. Hedlefs in 1920, by Mrs S. Lawson in 1931, then by 1932, Mrs Blanche E. Sadd. The hotel licence again was transferred in February 1936 to Henry McCulloch. The hotel was completely destroyed by fire, suspected to be related to the hotel refrigerator, in May 1942.

Honorary staff supported the Queensland Ambulance Transport Board, with the nearest hospital being at Cloncurry. By 1955 the area was covered by the Royal Flying Doctor Service, who additionally positioned a special medical chest in the town.

Cattle properties in the area included Lorraine (72 miles (116 km) north of Dobbyn), managed by families including the Burnetts and the Bakers. In 1932, over £100 worth of retail stock (equivalent to A$9800 in 2020) was lost with the total loss of the Dobbyn Mine Store by fire. A strong wind-fanned fire on 22 April 1933 saw the total loss of the grocery and drapery store run by Arsala Khan. (Note: An Afghan, Arsala KHAN's name has been also reported as Arsalla KHAN, Arsula KHAN, Charlie Arsullah KHAN and Arsula GHAN.) He vowed it would be rebuilt as an ant-proof building on concrete blocks.

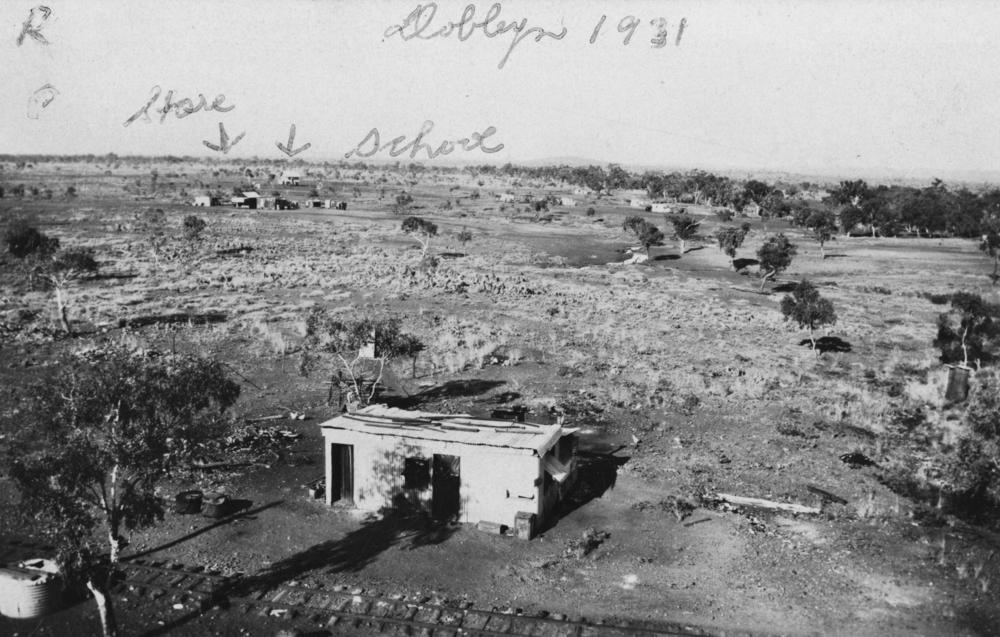
General store along Kitchener Street, state school further back, Coppermine Creek to right, railway line in the foreground, 1931

Downsizing

The economic downturn in copper in the mid-1930s saw the townships like Dobbyn in the Cloncurry area becoming depopulated.

Local miner William 'Snowy' Dorman, who was part of the 1931–1932 mining conditions strike, joined the Second Australian Imperial Force for World War II as a gunner. He visited the Dobbyn school students when on a week's leave in June 1942; dying in a military aircraft crash in poor weather over Springsure, Queensland on 16 November 1943, one month before his fortieth birthday, when being flown from Batchelor, Northern Territory to Archerfield, Brisbane.

Long-term resident of thirty years, miner and general storekeeper, Val Elliott was buried in the cemetery on Friday 20 November 1942, aged 61. Parts of the Dobbyn cemetery still remain, with some iron wrought-fenced graves.

By early 1943 the thriving mining town of Mount Cuthbert and its smelters, and Oona at the rail junction with its public hotel, were "no more" and Dobbyn had but a few residents; Kajabbi to the south now considered the social centre. Horses, buggies, sulkies, and supper dances were no more, replaced by motor cars, railways, and aircraft; "but whether they have brough more happiness is problematical". Queensland Railway's decision in June 1946 to remove the 6 miles (9.7 km) Oona–Mount Cuthbert line from the main Cloncurry–Dobbyn railway line was met with immediate concern of how it may affect any economic restoration to the area. An initial six-month stay was enacted the following month. Regardless, in December 1961 the final rails of the Mount Cuthbert and Dobbyn railway lines were removed following the June line closure. The route can still be seen on aerial imagery.

The town's 1918 school after 1933 was closed for an unknown period of time before approved to reopen on a trial basis in August 1945. The school saw some enhancements in later 1950, with a new classroom floor, repairs to the rain tank, and new lavatory pits. In conjunction with the 1951 Cloncurry jubilee celebrations, students of the school sports day competed against Quamby State School, Cloncurry State School, and Saint Joseph's Convent school. With fresh milk supply to students as part of a government programme, a free powdered milk service was considered instead for schools in the area. The school permanently closed in March 1955 due to insufficient students, not being able to reach eight pupils. The building continued to be used as a polling station.

Mail delivery through the area was done by a weekly air service, train, motor truck, and packhorse. A case was being mounted in 1944 to have the Burketown route mail lorry starting point moved to Kajabbi given that Dobbyn had no lodging or meals for visitors (given there was just a temporary bar since the 1942 loss of the hotel), the additional 50 miles (80 km) of route would include Coolullah and Denata pastoral stations, and a better route north to Kamilaroi station. Mail originally had left from Kajabbi until Jack Hedlefs built the Dobbyn hotel; where it was suggested he used his contacts to advantage the change.

By mid-1947, a minister of the Australian Inland Mission described Dobbyn "as a hillbilly township" of nine floorless galvanised-iron houses, separated by creeks.

Cattle continued as the pastoral industry of the area, including in the 1950s, Kingfield and Kalura stations.

The opening of the uranium ore-mining town of Mary Kathleen to the south saw the movement of government buildings in 1958. Undergoing repainting for the station, lock-up, and constables' quarters in 1950, the portable police station was moved to Mary Kathleen in 1957, and is now at a museum in Cloncurry.

A landing strip is maintained to the east of the town, along what was once Orphan Road (GPS 19.79331°S 140.0055°E).

== Mining ==
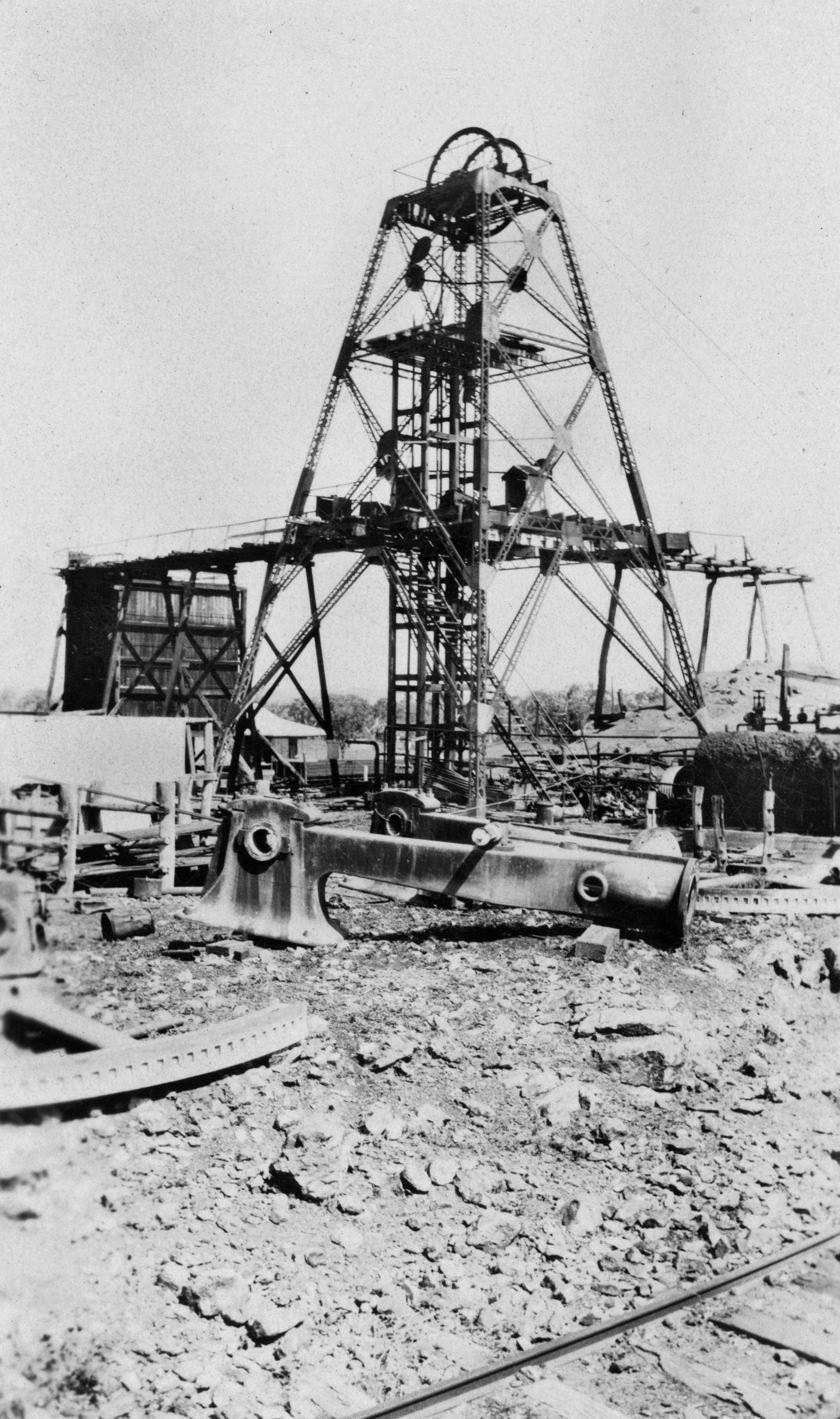
Dobbyn Mine poppet head, 1931

The Crusader copper mine was established south-east of Dobbyn near Mount Crusader, discovered in the 1890s. Around the Crusader fault is quartzite quartzitic sandstone, sheared and partly mineralised granite, amphibolite, with the copper within chalcopyrite with the presence of pyrite and magnetite.

By 1907, Queensland Copper Freeholds Ltd held the freehold properties including the one with the Dobbins mine.

By 1909, Crusader and Dobbyn mining leases were considered unproductive due to the lack of a Gulf railway.

Following additional exploration in early 1913, the Mount Cuthbert area proved the presence of high-grade copper, and at Dobbyn at depths under 75 feet (23 m) over 4000 tons of ore (being 28–45% copper) was raised by the Queensland Copper Freeholds Limited company. The "Cloncurry copper belt" was considered to be one of the richest belts in the world, to which in 1915, Dobbyn was part.

Immediately around the town, Dobbin [sic] No. 1 mine was south-west of the town centre, beside the west side of Kitchener Street (and later given as Dobbyn South and North Dobbyn). To the north of No. 1 was No. 2 (later, North Dobbin No. 1). The Orphan mines were to the east and north-east.

Dobbyn became the railhead for the Mount Cuthbert and Dobbyn railway lines (1917–1961), the now-ghost town of Mount Cuthbert being 24 kilometres (15 mi) SSW of Dobbyn.

The Mount Elliott Company, whilst holding the Crusader lease from 1915, did not commence earnest working until 1922 to 1928, before resuming in 1941 for a period of time; the ore estimated to yield about 2.4% copper at 200 feet (61 m) depth. Similarly, April 1921 saw work on the Orphan mine shaft by the Mount Cuthbert Company.

Mid-1919 saw the deportation of copper miner, communist, and political activist Paul Freeman (c. 1884–1921) under the War Precautions Act 1914 (Cwlth) as an undesirable alien following his agitations.

Despite the Cloncurry copper field being described as the best in Australia and in the Commonwealth, by November 1921 the area's mining industry downturn with mines, furnaces, and smelters was due to the world market downturn. With production costs unable to be passed on, the high costs of wages, railway freight, furnace fuels, together with recent periodic shipping strikes all impacted sustainability and viability.

About October 1931, miners from Dobbyn, Mount Oxide, and Orphan mines were on strike regarding poor wages and conditions, for which Queensland Railways became involved. With the tributors dissolving a partnership, the Mount Elliott Company became the leaseholders of those mines. With various incidents, including the emergency Railway Strike and Public Safety Preservation Act 1931 (Qld) legislation being enacted in November 1931 (and repealed weeks later), police attended to ensure the train and ore trucks could be loaded without interference on Saturday 19 March 1932. Two days later the leader of the strike committee allegedly dynamited part of a railway line and bridge at Elsie Siding, and was subsequently arrested. (On Friday 6 May 1932 at the Supreme Court in Townsville, the matter was dismissed.) The strike was settled in early April 1932.

In 1933, falls in copper prices during the Great Depression were met with area concerns of mine closures and greater unemployment. The Dobbyn Mine closed by February 1933, followed by the Orphan mine in March 1933 despite recent busy efforts. Warwick Castle mine still remained operational. With the rise in copper prices, both Orphan and Mount Oxide mines resumed work albeit with less staff than previous. One motor lorry and camel teams were used to move the ore.

The mining of cobalt salts for steel alloys was discussed in October 1941, with reference to the area's successful 1920s Queen Sally mine. (It appears no further action was taken, and the main source being Mount Cobalt at Selwyn to the south remained closed.)

In 1942, within a 10 kilometres (6.2 mi) radius of Dobbyn, outside of Dobbyn itself, noted eighteen mine sites: Ajax, Clinker, Crusader, Crusader North, Edison, Flaneur, Grand Junction, Lady Janet, Maxim, Merry Monarch, Mount Leonard, Mount Ritchie, Mount Sparklet, New Year Mines, Record, Rio Tinto, The Perseverance, and The Unexpected King. The Iguana and Warwick Castle mines were still being worked at this time. By December 1944, six mines were being worked: Dobbyn, Orphan, Crusader, Mount Cuthbert, Warwick Castle, and Little Wonder; Mount Elliott company's Dobbyn and Crusader fields yielding 5% copper in the ore.

By September 1945 it was reported only three mines were still being worked: Crusader, Little Wonder, and Mussolini; where Crusader hit an all-copper vein.

June 1951 saw an application to take up the lease of Hidden Treasure of 5 acres (2.0 ha) just south of Dobbyn. In August 1952 application was again made for a mineral mining lease at Warwick Castle, of 5 acres (2.0 ha) about 12 miles (19 km) SW of Dobbyn (GPS 19.90666°S 139.89661°E); and again in December 1955 by different persons. Paddy's Luck lease was subject to an application in May 1953, the claim being 28 miles (45 km) north-west of the township.

Open pit mines can still be observed, but would need to be dewatered:

- Dobbyn mine area – GPS 19.79714°S 139.9980°E;
- Orphan mine area – GPS 19.787361°S 140.024167°E;
- Crusader mine area – GPS 19.82006°S 140.04614°E; and
- Mount Fox area – GPS 19.770194°S 139.885611°E.

== See also ==
- List of mines in Australia
- Mining in Australia
