= Mount Elliot =

Mount Elliot may refer to:

- Mount Elliot, New South Wales, Australia
- Mount Elliot, Queensland, Australia (tourist location near Townsville)
- Mount Elliot (New Zealand), a mountain in Fiordland
- Mount Elliott Company Metallurgical Plant and Mill (information about the mining company)
- Mount Elliott mine, near Mount Isa (location of mining lease)
- Mount Elliott Mining Complex (historic mining complex, heritage listed)
- Mount Elliot (Antarctica)

== See also ==
- Mount Elliott (disambiguation)
