= Crotopsalta poaecetes =

Scientific classification
- Kingdom: Animalia
- Phylum: Arthropoda
- Clade: Pancrustacea
- Class: Insecta
- Order: Hemiptera
- Suborder: Auchenorrhyncha
- Family: Cicadidae
- Genus: Crotopsalta
- Species: C. poaecetes

Binomial name
- Crotopsalta poaecetes Ewart, 2005

Species of cicada

Crotopsalta poaecetes is a species of cicada, also known as the Cloncurry ticker, in the true cicada family, Cicadettinae subfamily and Cicadettini tribe. It is endemic to Australia. It was described in 2005 by Australian entomologist Anthony Ewart.

== Etymology ==
The specific epithet poaecetes comes from Greek poa and ecetes, meaning 'grass dweller'.

== Description ==
The length of the forewing is 10–12 mm.

== Distribution and habitat ==
The species occurs in an area of north-west Queensland bounded by Cloncurry, Dajarra, Quamby and Gunpowder. The associated habitat includes grassy woodland and open grassland.

== Behaviour ==
Adults may be heard from November to April after rain, clinging to grass stems, uttering slow, high-pitched, ticking calls.
