= Mount Cuthbert Township and Smelter =

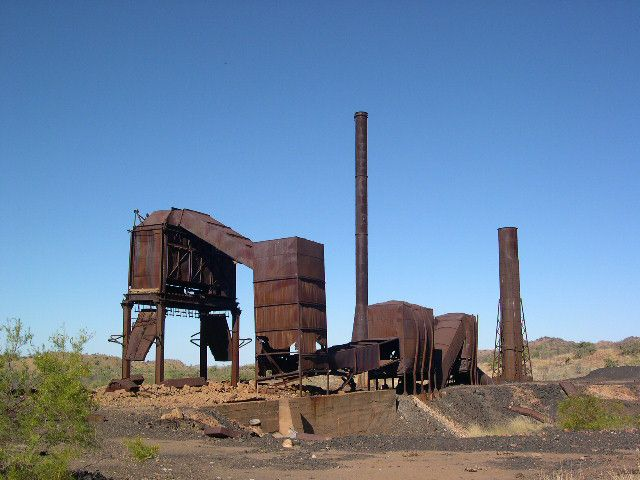
- Ruins, 2003

- Location within Queensland Location within Australia
- 19.9852°S 139.9197°E
- Location: North-West of Kajabbi Township, Three Rivers, Shire of Cloncurry, Queensland, Australia

History
- Design period: 1900 - 1914 (early 20th century)
- Built: c. 1908 - c. 1925

Queensland Heritage Register
- Official name: Mount Cuthbert Township and Smelter, Kalkadoon Mine and Winding Plant, Mount Cuthbert Mine and Smelter, Mount Cuthbert Township and Railway Formation
- Type: state heritage (archaeological)
- Designated: 25 May 2004
- Reference no.: 601629
- Significant period: c. 1908-c. 1925 (historical)
- Significant components: wall/s - retaining, objects (movable) - mining/mineral processing, slag pile/slag heap, oven, abutments - railway bridge, cellar, railway siding, smelter, magazine / explosives store, tank stand, fireplace, embankment - railway, mullock heap, chimney/chimney stack

Mount Cuthbert Township and Smelter is a heritage-listed mining camp north-west of Kajabbi Township, Three Rivers, Shire of Cloncurry, Queensland, Australia. It was built from c. 1908 to c. 1925. It is also known as Kalkadoon Mine & Winding Plant, Mount Cuthbert Mine & Smelter, and Mount Cuthbert Township & Railway Formation. It was added to the Queensland Heritage Register on 25 May 2004.

== History ==
Ernest Henry discovered copper in the general vicinity of Mount Cuthbert in 1867, but it was not developed further at that time. John Chapman investigated Mount Cuthbert, Excelsior and Mighty Atom copper claims in 1900 on behalf of Melbourne investors. Mount Cuthbert assayed the best at 6.5%.

The decision by the Queensland Government to extend the Great Northern railway from Townsville to beyond Richmond stimulated further exploration in 1905–06. In 1907 the Mount Cuthbert Company had capital of £240,000 and its mines included Mount Cuthbert, Kalkadoon, Mighty Atom, Orphan (near Dobbyn) and Little Wonder. The company had major financial problems from 1909 because of the lack of rail freight and had to reconstruct its capital holdings in 1912.

In 1915, with the price of copper soaring, the company spent £120,000 constructing smelters and had already sent away copper matte by horse teams before the Mount Cuthbert and Dobbyn railway reached the mine in September 1916. William Henry Corbould, who was appointed Mount Elliott mine manager in 1909 had a grand vision for rationalising the copper industry in the Cloncurry district but, while war delayed its implementation an arrangement was worked out with Mount Cuthbert whereby up to 150 long tons (150 t) of ore per day were to be treated at the Mount Elliott smelter at Selwyn until the Mount Cuthbert plant was completed. Then the situation would be reversed while Mount Elliott increased the capacity of its smelter. Accordingly, the Selwyn smelter ran for five months at the end of 1915 and into 1916 treating both companies' ore, including 13,000 long tons (13,000 t) railed from Mount Cuthbert.

The Mount Cuthbert smelter was designed by W.H. Corbould, who was also a noted metallurgist and its completion was delayed because of the war. The blast furnaces were eventually fired early in 1917 and the initial operation treated over 25,000 long tons (25,000 t) of ore which produced 1,804 long tons (1,833 t) of copper worth £202,350. The Mount Cuthbert Company also invested in a new winding engine and headframe, 200 long tons (200 t) capacity ore bins, extensions to the blacksmith's shop and electricity connected to all the surface buildings. The old equipment was removed and reassembled at the Orphan mine.

Mount Cuthbert township was surveyed by the Queensland Mines Department in 1916, but the nearby mines had been worked from 1908 which might explain the close proximity of the settlement to the mines and therefore the smelter.

At its peak Mount Cuthbert township had two hotels, a cordial factory, two stores, three fruiterers, a photographer, butcher, baker, fancy goods/barber, hospital, police station, boarding house and two railway stations (Mount Cuthbert and Dollubeet). A post office operated from 1908 to 1927. The mining company officers were housed in timber cottages and a barracks, while the majority of residents lived in tents or small corrugated iron shacks with earth floors and stone hearths.

Teamsters supplied logs to the sawmill operating to supply mine timbers from 1913. A school opened in 1917 with 30 pupils taught by Miss E Stapleton. At one point in 1917 the town was reported on the verge of starvation due to problems with railway freight operations.

Today the township area contains about 60 discernible building remains and stone footings, and a commercial area near the railway on the eastern side of the settlement. A cellar, cement floor and ships tank baking oven indicate the site of the hotel, which reputedly was moved to Kajabbi where it still serves as the Kalkadoon Hotel.

The railway arrived at Mount Cuthbert in October 1915 after taking two years to construct the section north-east from Dugald River. The curving alignment passes through narrow gaps in ridge spurs and follows the Six Mile Creek. Its formation features embankments, cuttings and bridgeworks. Without the railway, production from the smelters was hampered due to exorbitant freight costs. There were two wayside sidings, Mount Cuthbert and the terminus, Dollubeet, at Kalkadoon.

The Kalkadoon mine is part of the Mount Cuthbert mine group, situated about 2 kilometres (1.2 mi) north along the same geological formation. The earliest mineral lease to be granted in the Mount Cuthbert area was that of the Kalkadoon to Cuthbert Fetherstonhaugh of Cloncurry who took up 4.05 hectares (10.0 acres) from 1 August 1899. This mine was mentioned by William Lees in 1906 as the "old mine" and it had already produced 300 long tons (300 t) of high grade ore.

It was further developed by the Mount Cuthbert Company from about 1907. By 1912 temporary pithead gear was in place: a winch and boiler and a headframe from Charters Towers was installed the next year. By 1916 the main shaft was down 107 metres (351 ft). Ore mined at the Kalkadoon was smelted at Mount Cuthbert from 1917 and sent to Britain as prime blister copper. It is presumed that the mine closed in 1920 when smelting ceased at Mount Cuthbert. Its manager, J. Delaney, was a well known football player in the district.

In 1918 there was a fatal accident in the Mount Cuthbert mine at the 107 metres (351 ft) level. By 1919 the main shaft was down to 148 metres (486 ft). In 1918 the Mount Cuthbert smelters treated 36,500 long tons (37,100 t) of ore until November when the crankshaft broke on the blower engine and closed the smelters after a record run. They were not refired until August 1919 and continued smelting copper until the price fell in 1920. The smelters shut down on 19 June 1920 after a final run of only 63 days.

The company was forced into raising capital in 1919 and attempted a further financial reconstruction in 1922. However, continued annual losses, low metal prices and pressing debenture commitments forced its liquidation in 1923. In 1925 the Mount Elliott Company purchased the Mount Cuthbert properties and plant for an undisclosed sum, certainly much less than the £500,000 valuation. The population rose from 50 in 1908, to a peak of 1,000 in 1918, then dropped to 750 in 1920 and to 400 in 1924, but Mount Cuthbert became a ghost town after the Mount Elliott Company bought the mine and plant in 1925.

In 1942 Mount Isa Mines bought the Mount Cuthbert smelters for £900 and plant and other machinery was railed through Cloncurry to Mount Isa's new copper smelter. The Kalkadoon was worked on tribute again in the 1960s before being abandoned.

== Description ==
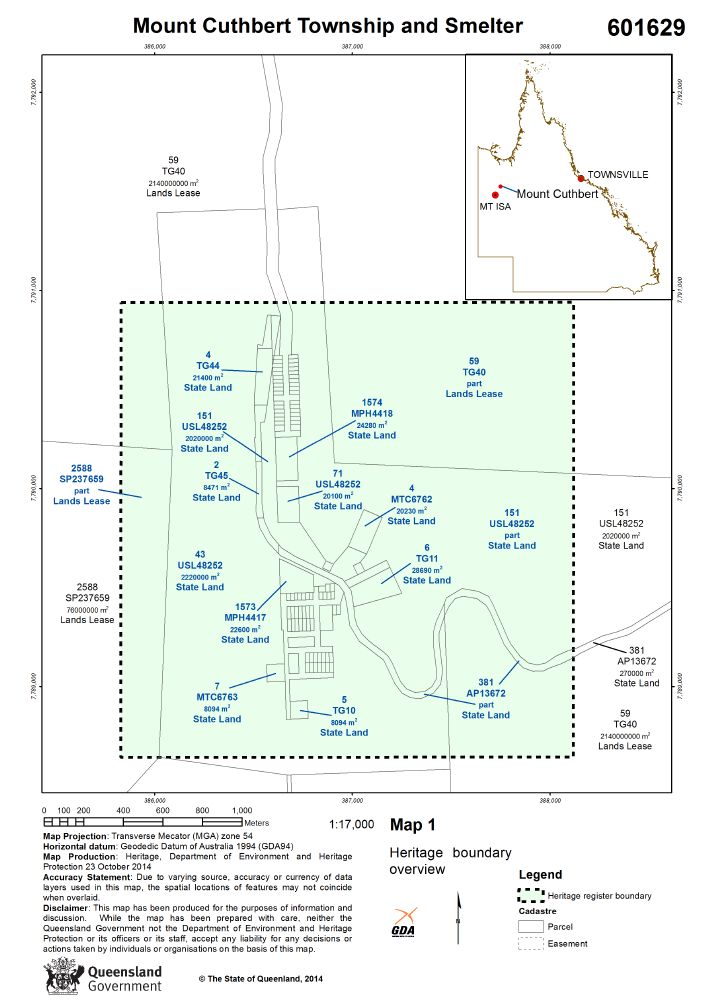
Map, 2014

=== Mount Cuthbert Smelter ===
The place covers an extensive area of the Six Mile Creek valley with the main concentrations of features exceeding an area of 1 kilometre (0.62 mi) (east- west) by 2 kilometres (1.2 mi) (north-south). The smelter structure and a tranship stage form a closely integrated group of components. A large, well formed slag dump extends to the base of the smelter. The smelter remains are impressive, comprising three standing steel chimneys, blast furnace frame, elevated iron flues, flue dust bins, and two copper converters. The smelter floor is a raised earth platform with high concrete retaining walls each side. The blast furnace has been removed leaving the steel frame and furnace hood. Extending north-east of the smelter floor are the concrete foundations and earth bench surfaces of the power house. Storage hopper footings of a tranship stage are located along a rail spur line which terminates near the smelter floor. The tranship stage accommodates two rail alignments separated by a raised concrete platform. A line of reinforced concrete piers and headstocks remain standing as evidence of an elevated rail alignment.

=== Mount Cuthbert Township and Railway Formation ===
The railway spur line formation to Mount Cuthbert from Oona siding on the Kajabbi to Dobbyn railway line, generally follows the course of Six Mile Creek. Embankments, cuttings and bridgeworks occur through the range east of Mount Cuthbert. Sections of the railway formation now serve as the main access track. Timber sleepers survive on some sections where the formation has been bypassed. No bridges remain intact and all rails have been removed. Timber piers and stone pitched abutments of several bridges including the Six Mile Creek bridge east of Mount Cuthbert have survived. The formation passes through a series of curved cuttings and embankments on its final approach to the town. From a spur loop north of the smelter three rail formations are discernible to the smelter, tranship stage, and the Mount Cuthbert mine. The main formation turns north to Mount Cuthbert railway station by the Kalkadoon mine. The rail formation terminates about 400 metres (1,300 ft) north beyond the Kalkadoon. Surface evidence of the locations of the railway station building, platform and goods shed is still apparent on the east side of the formation.

On its final approach to Mount Cuthbert, the rail formation curves around the site of the township which is situated on a low rise east of the smelter. Surviving evidence of the main concentration of dwellings and commercial premises covers an area of 500 metres (1,600 ft) (east-west) by 400 metres (1,300 ft) (north-south). This area contains about 60 identifiable structural sites including stone fireplaces, stone-lined floor surfaces, retaining walls, and tank stands. The commercial precinct is clearly discernible by a grouping of cement rendered surfaces close to the railway on the eastern side of the settlement. A cellar, cement floor and ships tank bake-oven mark the site of a hotel. A smithy and stone yards are evident together with over six stores. Many smaller dwelling sites, some with stone fireplaces, are located on the western side of the township hill overlooking the mine and smelter. The company officer's housing precinct site is located away from the township to the north, in a small gully of Six Mile Creek between the smelter and the Kalkadoon mine.

=== Kalkadoon Mine and Winding Plant ===
The Kalkadoon is located on a hillside north of Mount Cuthbert smelter, overlooking Dollubeet railway siding and the railway terminus. The mine workings contain evidence of several periods of development. No surface evidence remains of the early main shaft that was serviced by the surviving winding plant. Two open cut workings are located either side of a recent open adit and shaft. Plant includes a winding engine on a concrete mount alongside a Cornish boiler. The winding engine retains asbestos lagged steam pipes. A second Cornish boiler is located (not in situ) in front of the winding plant. An egg-end air receiver tank is located between the winding plant and the early main shaft site.

The area immediately south of the plant has been extensively disturbed by bulldozing in recent months for use as a drilling pad. Likewise an area north of the winding plant. The remains of mullock dumps extend east from the early main shaft site and adjacent open cut workings. A stone fireplace and cement surface are located between the mullock and railway formation. A stone magazine is situated north of the mine close to a former siding area near the railway terminus.

Surviving plant includes:

- Cornish boiler - no brand
- Cornish boiler (not in situ) - no brand
- Two-cylinder twin drum steam winding engine - no brand
- Air receiver tank (egg-ended) - no brand
- 3 Safety cages (not in situ).

== Heritage listing ==
Mount Cuthbert Township and Smelter was listed on the Queensland Heritage Register on 25 May 2004 having satisfied the following criteria.

The place is important in demonstrating the evolution or pattern of Queensland's history.

The town typifies the short-lived (1915–25), capital intensive, copper mining towns that developed rapidly and then ceased almost overnight. The Kalkadoon mine is significant as the earliest and one of the most productive components of the Mount Cuthbert mining operation. It was functionally and physically linked by the railway to the Mount Cuthbert smelter. The place is located above the valley floor with views south over the smelter.

The place demonstrates rare, uncommon or endangered aspects of Queensland's cultural heritage.

The Corbould design of the blast furnace, flue and dust retainers at the Mount Cuthbert Smelter appears to be unique among similar smelters in North Queensland. The Kalkadoon Mine's winding plant, which is largely intact, is an atypical and now rare example of its type.

The place has potential to yield information that will contribute to an understanding of Queensland's history.

In this case, the town's remote location and isolation have kept it relatively intact and preserved its archaeological values.

The place is important in demonstrating the principal characteristics of a particular class of cultural places.

Mount Cuthbert township and railway is significant as it provides a tangible demonstration of the close physical relationships and linkages between the mine and smelter, with the railway and township. Although this pattern can be observed in other mining settlements such as Mount Mulligan or Kuridala, the location of the elements here is physically close and aesthetically pleasing. Mount Cuthbert Smelter is significant as the largest and most impressive early smelter remains in North Queensland. It is the last early phase smelter (1916–20) built in the Cloncurry district and - although among the least successful of the larger works - it has left the most structural evidence despite the stripping of its furnaces and parts to equip the new Mount Isa smelter in the 1940s. The works clearly demonstrate physical links with the company's mines - Mount Cuthbert, Kalkadoon, Mighty Atom and Orphan - and also with the adjacent township area and the rail route from Kajabbi. The extent, diversity and concentration of associated features are unrivalled.

The place is important because of its aesthetic significance.

The physical grouping of the smelter, slag dump, railway and township is unique. The natural environment of the Six Mile Creek valley is a distinguishing feature. The place provides sweeping panoramas of the archaeology of early industry and settlement. The appearance of the smelter during the final approach along the railway cutting presents a reminder of the isolation of early mining settlements in remote regions of Australia. The current access to the town via the picturesque railway alignment further heightens the visitor's appreciation of the large-scale early mining venture in the wilderness.

The place is important in demonstrating a high degree of creative or technical achievement at a particular period.

The Corbould design of the blast furnace, flue and dust retainers at the Mount Cuthbert Smelter appears to be unique among similar smelters in North Queensland.
