= Gunpowder, Queensland =

Former mining town in north-west Queensland, Australia

Gunpowder
- Town
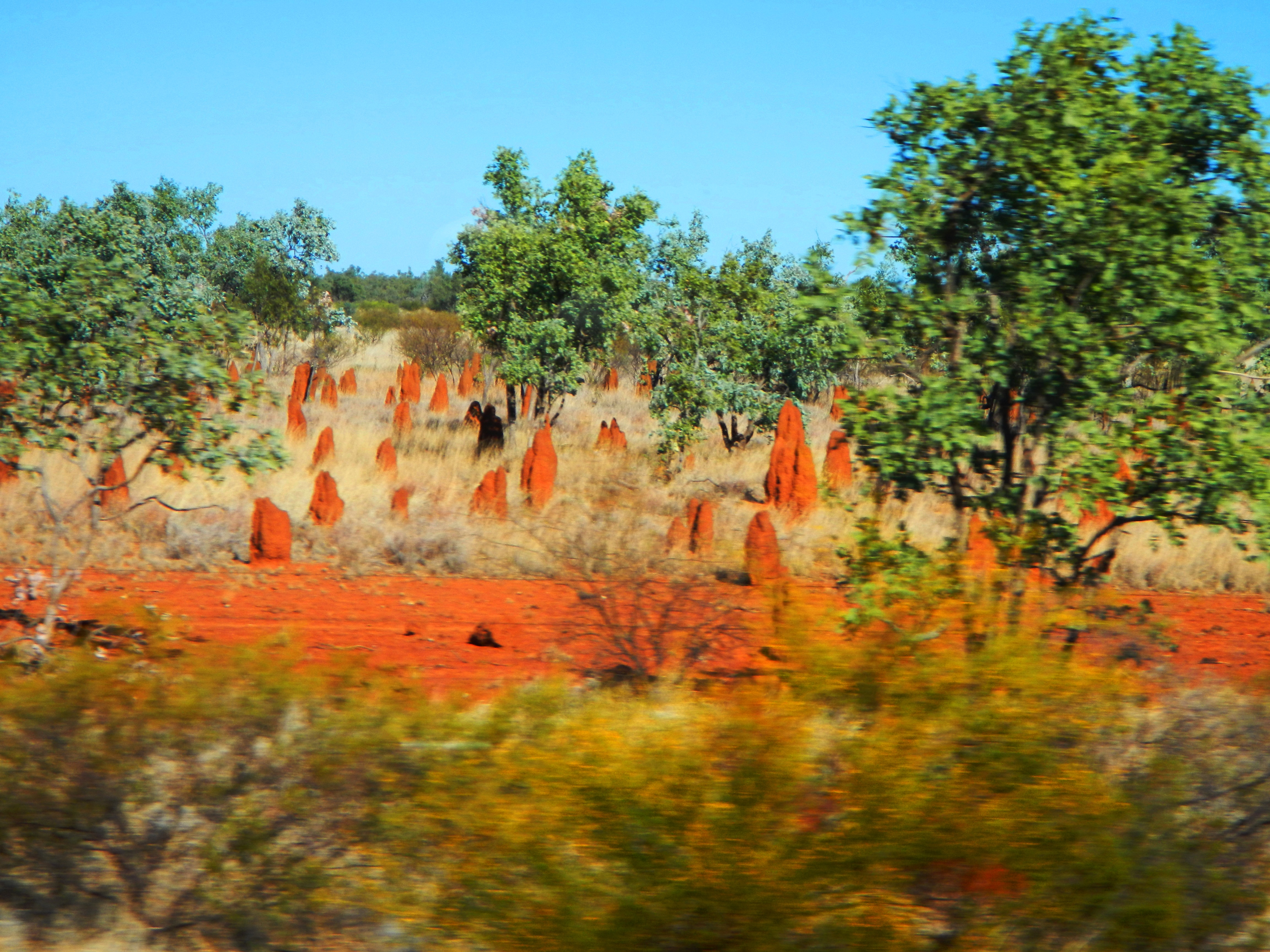
- Landscape

- Interactive map of Gunpowder
- Coordinates: 19.7176°S 139.3786°E
- Country: Australia
- State: Queensland
- LGA: City of Mount Isa
- Location: 128 km (80 mi) N of Mount Isa; 1,032 km (641 mi) W of Townsville; 1,953 km (1,214 mi) NW of Brisbane

Government
  - State electorate: Traeger
  - Federal division: Kennedy

Area
  - Total: 7,793.2 km^{2} (3,009.0 sq mi)

Population
  - Total: 104 (2021 census)
  - Density: 0.01334/km^{2} (0.03456/sq mi)
- Time zone: UTC+10:00 (AEST)
- Postcode: 4825
Localities around Gunpowder
Lawn Hill	Gregory	Gidya
Camooweal	Gunpowder	Three Rivers
Barkly	Mount Isa (locality)	Mount Isa (locality)

Gunpowder is an outback town and locality in the City of Mount Isa, Queensland, Australia. In the 2021 census, the locality of Gunpowder had a population of 104 people. The predominant land use is grazing on native vegetation.

The area was formerly known as Mount Oxide, with frequent geographic distances referring to Gunpowder Creek (which likely leant its name to today's township). The closed Mount Oxide mine (19.479778°S 139.388361°E) is 8.3 kilometres (5.2 mi) NE of Mount Oxide, and 26 kilometres (16 mi) north of Gunpowder. There were and are still mines in the locality.

== History ==
The area was first settled by the Mayi-Katuna, Wakabunga, and Nguburinji First Nations people.

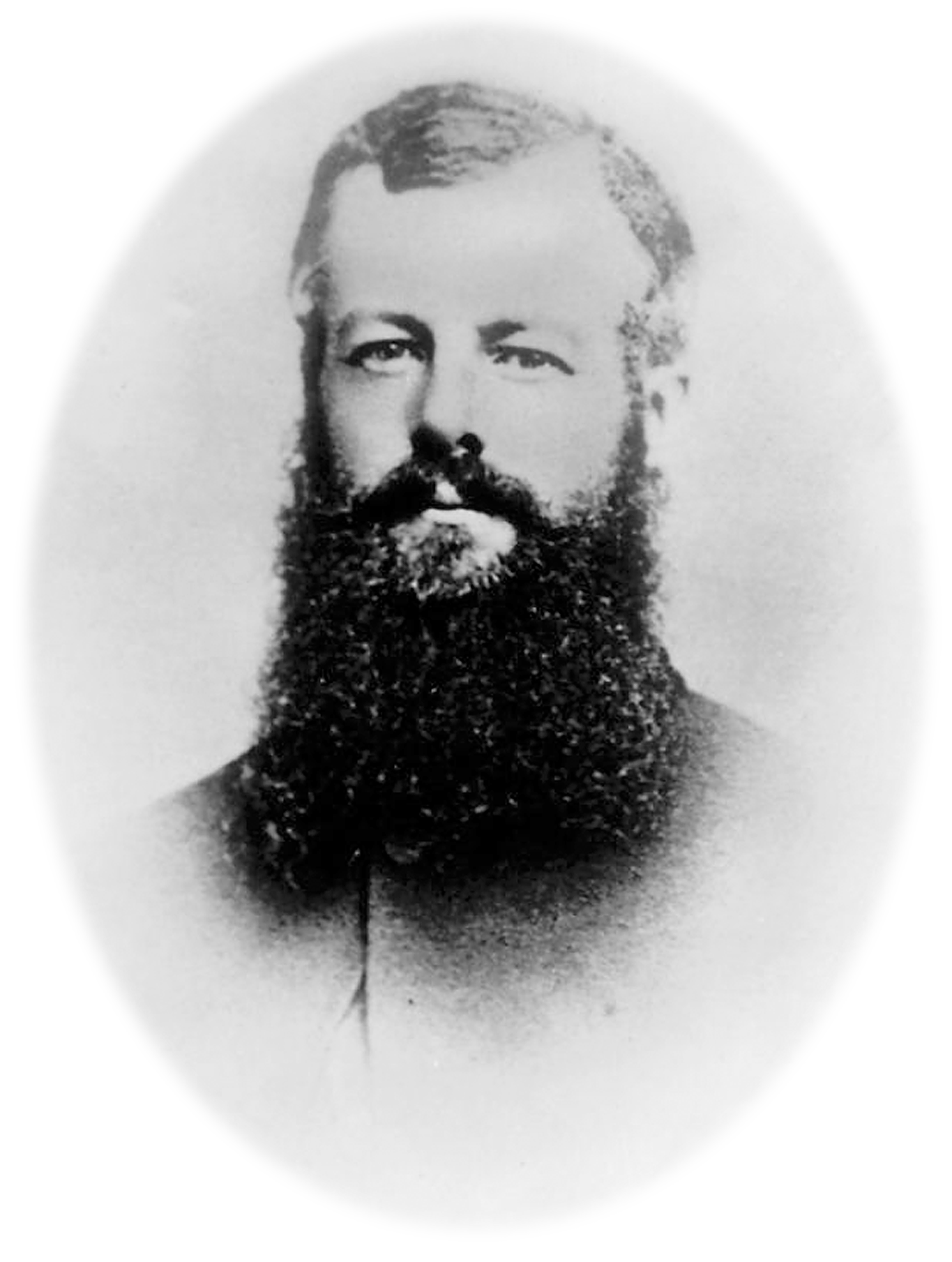
Explorer Ernest Henry

Copper was discovered at Mount Oxide by Ernest Henry (1837–1919) in 1882. Owing to the remote location, little mining took place until the 1920s. The mine was located 140 kilometres (87 mi) north of Mount Isa, and 40 kilometres (25 mi) north-east of Mount Gordon Mine (formerly known as Gunpowder). Henry named the feature after the oxidised iron rocks he found, and initially used caves in the area, where in one cave he hollowed out large chambers to become domestic rooms. He also noted:

he found on the walls and roof of the cave a number of native drawings, representing kangaroos, emus, tortoises, iguanas, snakes, rude outlines of the human figure, native weapons, shields, and so forth. Some of the drawings are scarcely discernible owing to their great age. No doubt the romantic and picturesque surroundings drew native gatherings to this spot for many generations of the now vanished aboriginal. A few yards down the sloping bank from the cave a well has been sunk in the bed of the creek for some 8ft., and a plentiful storage of water is thereby secured for domestic purposes.

The watercourse Gunpowder Creek was named well prior to 1906, whilst the mining leases of Big Ben, Baly Haly, and Calton Hills also existed. Their ore was moved 160 miles (260 km) by road to Burketown, by carrier or camel.

The Cloncurry–Oonah railway line from the south was proposed to be extended to Mount Oxide in December 1916, and would require funding from London. The Oonah line was extended to Dobbyn in 1917, but leaving the 70 miles (110 km) Mount Oxide extension unrealised: In fact, whilst desired by the Mount Elliott Company, it was recommended by the Public Works Commission that the "line should not be constructed" given insufficient long-term ore reserves and too narrow construction timeframes. The Cloncurry–Dobbyn line did assist in the movement of Mount Oxide ore. By 1919 it was proposed to extend the Cloncurry–Dobbyn line to Burketown at the Gulf of Carpentaria, towards Mount Oxide, and Gregory Downs station; It was countered a Cloncurry line to Karumba would be cheaper.

The main mining periods of the area were 1927–1943 and 1955–1960, when the higher-grade ore was worked by underground methods with access via an adit, and 1967–1971, when the lower-grade envelope and remnants of high-grade ore were bulk mined in an open-cut.

The Mammoth Copper Mine in 1924 was said to be yielding 25% copper from the ore. The proprietor miners were hoping for a Dobbyn–Mount Oxide rail line, given it was costing them £3/10/– (equivalent to A$292 in 2020) per ton for transportation by camel teams, separate to the additional railway charges.

In 1930 about six men were employed in the Mount Oxide mine, but more were employed in the transportation of ore to the railhead at Dobbyn to the south-east.

Along with the Dobbyn mines, the mine was subject to the 1931–1932 mining conditions strike.The strike was settled in early April 1932.

Mine closures and greater unemployment were a concern with the 1933 falling copper prices during the Great Depression. With the rise in copper prices, the Mount Oxide mine resumed work albeit with less staff than previous, with one motor lorry and camel teams used to move the ore.

Between World War I and World War II a First Nations townsite existed on the site named Waggabundi (after the Waggabonga group). The abandoned townsite is about 1 kilometre (0.62 mi) south of the existing open pit.

February 1940 saw a Mrs Wright travel from the family cattle station near Mount Oxide by horseback in rain-soaked and rugged country to Dobbyn, riding at least 86 miles (138 km). On arrival, her six-year-old son was placed on the fortunately-delayed weekly train to Cloncurry for medical attention for the burst appendix, whilst she rested then rode back.

Waggaboonyah Dam was built across Greenstone Creek in 1969 for water storage (19.6830°S 139.3811°E), and creates Waggaboonyah Lake (19.7°S 139.3833°E). Downstream of the dam the creek enters Gunpowder Creek. The dam is approximately 2 kilometres (1.2 mi) north of the town of Gunpowder.

Underground mining produced 79,000 tonnes of ore (15.9% Cu) for a yield of 12,500 tonnes of copper, and some 355,000 tonnes of ore averaging 2.5% copper were treated at the Gunpowder concentration plant in 1970–71. Leaching and precipitation operations in the 1962–1965 and 1978–1982 periods yielded an additional 1,369 tonnes of copper.

October 1971 saw the sale of $6.6 million, transferring the Gunpowder copper complex (Mammoth, Mount Oxide, Pluto, and Esperanza mine leases, concentrator plant and equipment) including the Gunpowder township from one business to a joint venture. It had been suggested the town population would increase to 5000 people.

Active mine sites in 2026 include:

- Capricorn Copper Mine (19.696222°S 139.360111°E), north of the town, mining for copper and silver. It is supported with an accommodation camp. Capricorn was the merger of Mount Gordon and Gunpowder mines;
- Lady Annie pit (19.77794°S 139.04627°E), mining copper. In 1970, it was given to have "huge phosphate deposits";
- Lady Loretta pit (19.76850°S 139.06733°E), with lead, zinc, and silver; and
- Mount Clarke pit (19.88933°S 139.13977°E), supported with the Lady Annie accommodation camp.

Mount Oxide Mine is now classed as an abandoned mine site as there is no current mining lease or environmental authority in place.

=== Mount Oxide mine remediation ===
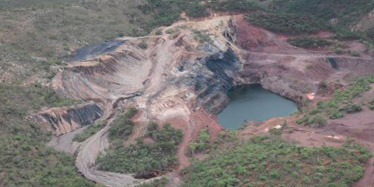
Aerial view of Mount Oxide main mine area, 2011

Legal issues were raised in the mid-1990s over the extent and responsibility for rehabilitation liability for the Mount Oxide abandoned mine site. The operators of the site who caused the mining disturbances no longer exist as corporate entities.

The legacy of a century of mining activity has resulted in residual stockpiles, leach heaps and overburden dumps remaining on the site. Watercourses turn blue-green for several kilometres downstream of the mine pit (downstream of the confluence of the tributaries around the mine area) after moderate to heavy wet seasons. Downstream impacts have been observed to vary depending on the intensity of wet seasons and the time of visit, with impacts ranging from minimal to extensive downstream discolouration.

A government interdepartmental working group was formed to manage the impact of mine flooding in north-west Queensland. Immediate costs incurred to investigate and address issues were borne by individual agencies. The short-term objectives were to:

- minimise environmental harm at or from the site; and
- minimise the risk to health and safety of people and animals.

The long-term objective is to remediate the site to allow for an agreed future use of the land.

== Demographics ==
In the 2016 census, the locality of Gunpowder had a population of 43 people.

In the 2021 census, the locality of Gunpowder had a population of 104 people.

== Education ==
Gunpowder State School opened on 27 January 1970. It closed on 24 September 1982 but reopened on 24 January 1991. It closed permanently on 31 December 1999.

The nearest government primary schools are Camooweal State School in neighbouring Camooweal to the west and Barkly Highway State School in Soldiers Hill in Mount Isa to the south-east. The nearest government secondary school is Spinifex State College in Mount Isa. However, given the size of the locality of Gunpowder, for many parts of the locality the distances to the schools would be too far and distance education or boarding school would be necessary. Spinifex State College provides boarding facilities.

== Pastoral industry ==
There are a number of homesteads in the locality:

- Bar Creek (19.6243°S 139.2747°E)
- Calton Hills (20.1444°S 139.4140°E)
- Chidna (19.4330°S 139.4373°E)
- New Chidna (19.5076°S 139.3790°E)
- Yelvertoft (20.2136°S 138.8883°E)

== Geography ==
Waggabundi is a former Aboriginal township (19.4818°S 139.3845°E) in the vicinity of the Mount Oxide Mine.

Waggaboonyah Range (20.0808°S 139.3163°E) is a north–south range in the south of the locality.

The Gunpowder Airport is a sealed east-west runway (19.772611°S 139.402306°E) close to and south of the township and Capricorn Copper Mine; but almost two hours drive to the Mount Clarke mine site. There is an unsealed air strip (19.526472°S 139.375583°E) near New Chidna cattle property and Mount Gordon.

Mountains

- Kangaroo Pt (19.4634°S 139.4047°E)
- Mount Gordon (19.5206°S 139.4166°E) 330 metres (1,080 ft)
- Mount Oxide (19.5370°S 139.3232°E) 370 metres (1,210 ft)

Mountain passes

- Bone Gap (19.4164°S 139.4442°E)
- Kennedy Gap (20.4334°S 139.4079°E)
- Sisters Gap (19.4742°S 139.4104°E)
