= Kajabbi =

- Town
- Coordinates: 20.0322°S 140.0388°E
- Country: Australia
- State: Queensland
- LGA: Shire of Cloncurry
- Location: 100 km (62 mi) NW of Cloncurry; 118 km (73 mi) NE of Mount Isa; 1,805 km (1,122 mi) NW of Brisbane

Government
  - State electorate: Traeger
  - Federal division: Kennedy
- Time zone: UTC+10:00 (AEST)
- Postcode: 4824

Kajabbi is a rural town in the locality of Three Rivers, Shire of Cloncurry, Queensland, Australia.

== Geography ==
The town is on the Leichhardt River in the remote north-west of Queensland, 1,805 kilometres (1,122 mi) north west of the state capital Brisbane. The town is small, described by a travel writer as "no more than a pub and a couple of houses". The Kalkadoon Hotel is the only commercial business in the town.

== History ==
The town takes its name from the former Kajabbi railway station, which was named by Queensland Railways Department on 29 April 1915. It is reportedly an Aboriginal word, meaning kite hawk.

Nearby Battle Mountain was the scene of an armed conflict between local Kalkadoon people and European cattlemen supported by the armed forces. Many of the local Aborigines were killed. The battle took place in September 1884.

Kajabbi State School opened on 15 September 1919 and closed on 28 January 1975.

In the 1920s, Kajabbi was a service centre for nearby copper mines at Dobbyn and Mount Cuthbert. The town was a railhead on the Mount Cuthbert and Dobbyn railway lines and cattle from a wide area of north west Queensland were brought to the town to be railed to Cloncurry and onwards. Kajabbi Post Office opened on 13 June 1927 (a receiving office had been open from 1917) and closed in 1973.

In 2009, the Kalkadoon Hotel closed citing problems with meeting regulatory requirements.

It was purchased by Jeff and Lynette Bambrick in 2015 and after extensive renovations reopened in May 2020.

== Heritage listings ==
Kajabbi has a number of heritage-listed sites, including:

- Mount Cuthbert Township and Smelter, north-west of Kajabbi township
