= Mount Elliott Company Metallurgical Plant and Mill =

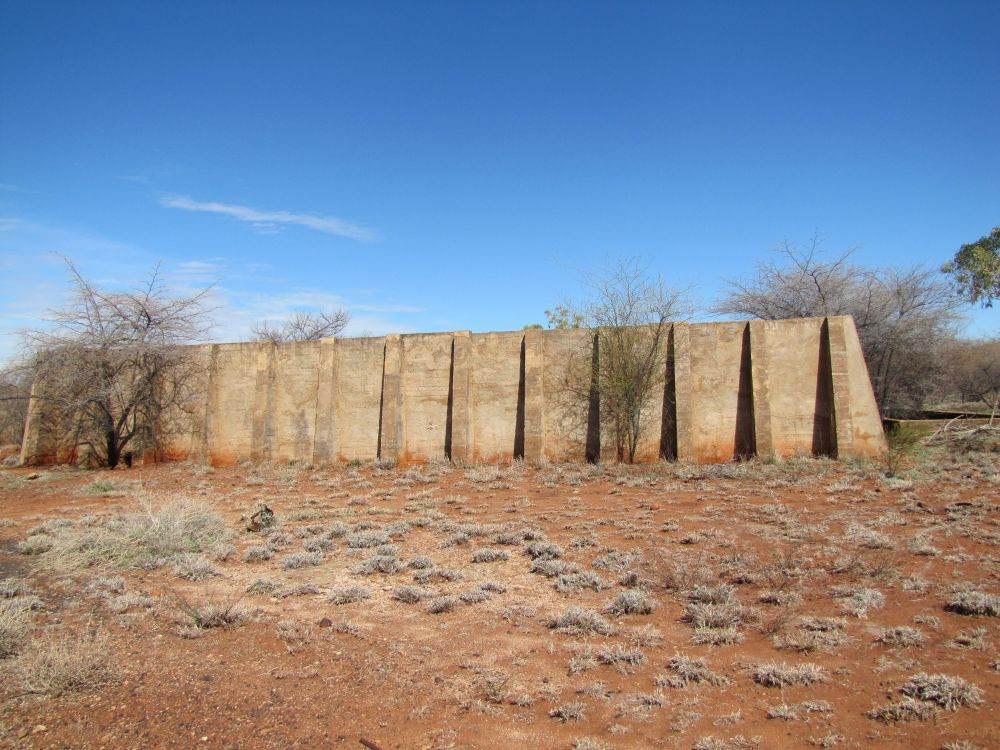
- Buttressed tank, 2013

- Location within Queensland Location within Australia
- 20.7199°S 140.4997°E
- Location: Via Sheaffe Street, Cloncurry, Shire of Cloncurry, Queensland, Australia

History
- Design period: 1919–1930s (interwar period)
- Built: 1926 – April 1927

Queensland Heritage Register
- Official name: Mount Elliott Company Metallurgical Plant and Mill
- Type: state heritage (built, archaeological)
- Designated: 17 June 2003
- Reference no.: 602256
- Significant period: 1926–1927 (fabric, historical)
- Significant components: machinery/plant/equipment – mining/mineral processing, vat, flue, mounting block/stand, tank – storage, ramp

Mount Elliott Company Metallurgical Plant and Mill is a heritage-listed smelting works via Sheaffe Street, Cloncurry, Shire of Cloncurry, Queensland, Australia. It was built from 1926 to April 1927. It was added to the Queensland Heritage Register on 17 June 2003. See also Mount Elliott mine and Mount Elliott Mining Complex. Not to be confused with a tourist location of Mount Elliot, Queensland, near Townsville.

== History ==
During 1924–25 the Mount Elliott Company and Hampden Cloncurry negotiated a scheme of amalgamation but this fell through when Mount Elliott acquired the Mount Cuthbert properties. In 1926 Hampden Cloncurry conceded defeat and offered its assets for sale by tender, most being acquired by Mount Elliott, who finally gained control of virtually the entire Cloncurry copper field and belatedly fulfilled William Henry Corbould's vision of 1909 for amalgamation. But it was too late: funds were exhausted and prices were low. The company decided to use the Henry Squarebrigs Mackay's new process to utilise the low-grade ores of the district. This was a new form of electrolytic smelting.

In 1926 the company started building the first 1,000 long tons (1,000 t) per year unit of a large electro-chemical copper treatment plant at Cloncurry on the outskirts of the town adjacent to the Great Northern railway line. This comprised crushing, roasting furnace, leaching vats and a cell house section and was completed in April 1927. It was the first plant of its kind ever built and Mackay supervised its construction at Cloncurry.

The 6-metre (20 ft) diameter Mackay modified wedge furnace had seven roasting and one drying hearths. The furnace was connected to a Wilson pressure-type gas producer, which delivered gas to the roasting furnace as fuel to roast the ore. The furnace plant was enclosed in a steel building 11 by 11 metres (36 by 36 ft) and 12 metres (39 ft) high. In the leaching plant there were two reinforced concrete tanks 9 by 18 metres (30 by 59 ft) by 3 metres (9.8 ft) deep and four reinforced concrete solution storage tanks 9 metres (30 ft) in diameter and 3 metres (9.8 ft) deep. The plant for the electrolytic deposition of copper from the leaching solutions was in a two-storey steel building, 15 by 18 metres (49 by 59 ft) and 13 metres (43 ft) high. On the second level there were 24 wooded tanks 3.7 metres (12 ft) long, lined with lead, and containing electrolytic cells, cathodes, and anode bars. On the ground level were three wooden solution circulating tanks.

The power plant was located 4.5 metres (15 ft) from the electrolytic plant and housed in a steel building 9 by 18 metres (30 by 59 ft) by 9 metres (30 ft) high, with the boiler in a separate building. The plant included a Babcock and Wilcox boiler with a 37-metre (121 ft) steel chimney stack. A Belliss and Morcom compound engine was directly connected to a 400 kW alternator. A spray cooling plant consisting of a concrete reservoir 18 by 18 metres (59 by 59 ft) and 1.5 metres (4 ft 11 in) deep with a series of spray pipes and nozzles operated from an electric centrifugal pump, was designed to cool 30,000 imperial gallons (140,000 L; 36,000 US gal) of water an hour.

However, before the plant was actually commissioned, instructions were received from London to close down without even a trial run. Apparently, the £128,000 construction expenses had been too high and it was considered that the capacity was insufficient for profitability.

It has been asserted that the company had infringed a foreign patent, but cost factors may have influenced the decision to close the plant.

== Description ==
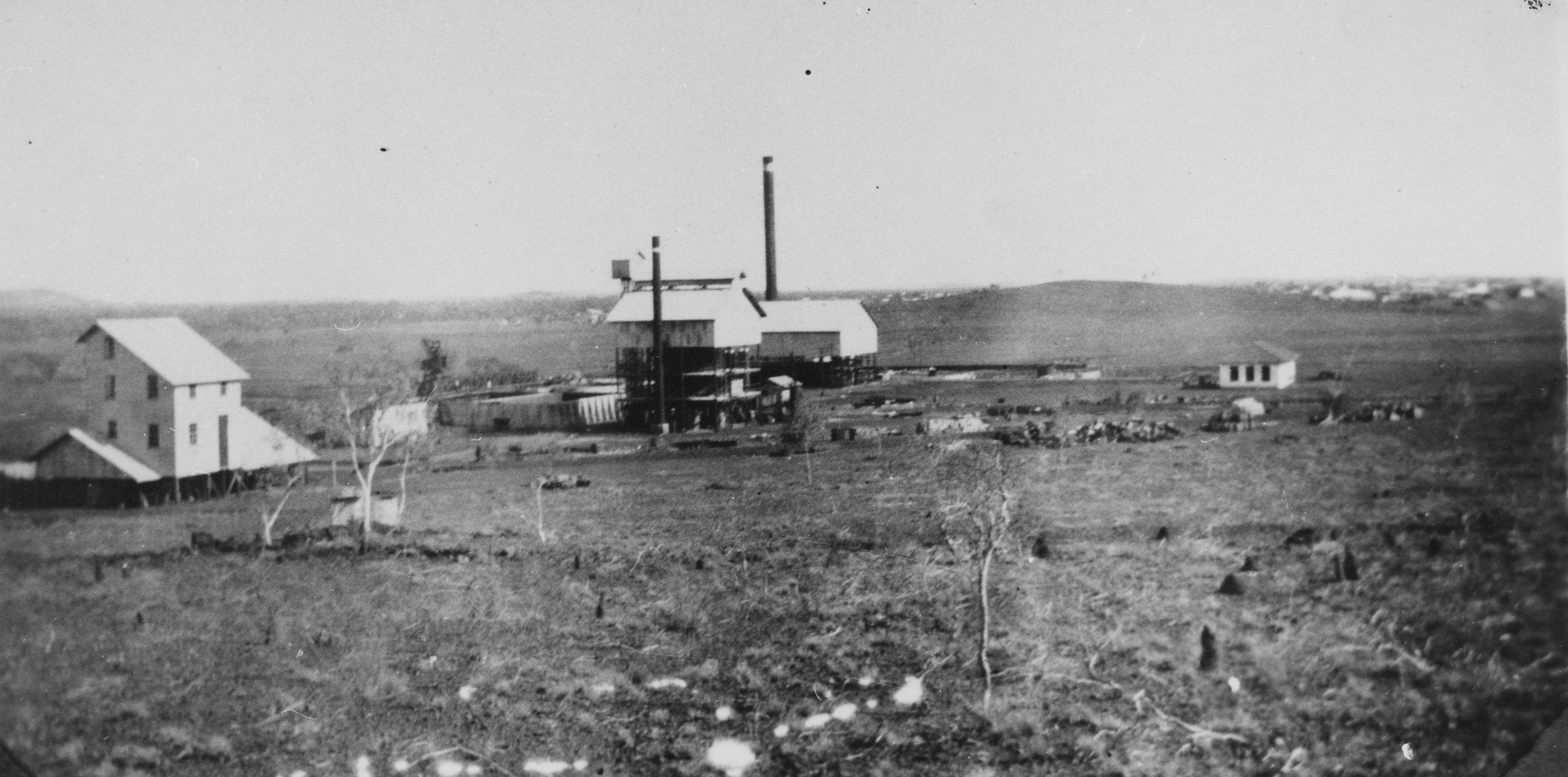
Treatment plant, 1928

The place contains the remains of an electrolytic reduction plant comprising five groups of structures.

The primary crusher and ore dump group situated to the south comprise an ore dump site, earth loading ramp, concrete surfaces, tanks and building foundations. An iron flotation unit is located on the site (not in situ).

To the north are the concrete mounts and foundations of a wedge roasting furnace. These structures include a flue and iron chimney base and a vertical boiler alongside a concrete tank.

Adjacent to the west is a large concrete leaching vat 20 metres (66 ft) square and 3 metres (9.8 ft) in height, which was originally equipped with a gantry crane. The walls of the vat are supported by heavy concrete buttresses.

To the north are four circular leaching vats of concrete construction each 11 metres (36 ft) in width and 3 metres (9.8 ft) in height.

The northern group of structures is located alongside to south of the Cloncurry - Mount Isa railway. This group comprises concrete surfaces and foundations of the electrolytic works, a rendered brick flue and base of an iron chimney and three concrete tanks each approximately 15 square metres (160 sq ft) by 1.5 metres (4 ft 11 in) in depth.

The fifth component of the site is the foundations of a former laboratory building, constructed with mud brick walls with cement render on exterior and interior surfaces.

Plant equipment at the site includes a vertical boiler (no brand) and flotation unit (not in situ) (no brand).

== Heritage listing ==
Mount Elliott Company Metallurgical Plant and Mill was listed on the Queensland Heritage Register on 17 June 2003 having satisfied the following criteria.

The place is important in demonstrating the evolution or pattern of Queensland's history.

Its construction testifies to the optimism held by the company for a centralised modern plant to service all their scattered ore reserves across the region.

The place demonstrates rare, uncommon or endangered aspects of Queensland's cultural heritage.

The Mount Elliott Company Metallurgical Plant is significant in Queensland's history as the only recorded surviving evidence of an early electrolytic plant. The laboratory remnants associated with the plant are architecturally uncommon, being made of ant bed adobe bricks.

The place is important in demonstrating a high degree of creative or technical achievement at a particular period.

The process was Henry Squarebrigs Mackay's own invention and the plant was designed in London. It was the first plant of its kind ever built and Mackay supervised its construction at Cloncurry.
