= Gidya, Queensland =

Gidya
- Suburb
- Interactive map of Gidya
- Coordinates: 19.2555°S 139.7797°E
- Country: Australia
- State: Queensland
- LGA: Shire of Burke
- Location: 218 km (135 mi) NNW of Cloncurry; 281 km (175 mi) S of Burketown; 335 km (208 mi) N of Mount Isa; 1,001 km (622 mi) W of Townsville; 1,923 km (1,195 mi) NW of Brisbane

Government
  - State electorate: Traeger
  - Federal division: Kennedy

Area
  - Total: 2,809.2 km^{2} (1,084.6 sq mi)

Population
  - Total: 0 (2021 census)
  - Density: 0.00000/km^{2} (0.0000/sq mi)
- Time zone: UTC+10:00 (AEST)
- Postcode: 4824
Suburbs around Gidya
| Gregory | Stokes | Four Ways |
| Gunpowder | Gidya | Four Ways |
| Three Rivers | Three Rivers | Three Rivers |

Gidya is a rural locality in the Shire of Burke, Queensland, Australia. In the 2021 census, Gidya had "no people or a very low population".

== Geography ==
Gidya is part of the Gulf Country. The Leichhardt River forms the eastern boundary of the locality.

The land use is grazing on native vegetation. Most of the locality is within the Kamilaroi pastoral station, which is owned by the Stanbroke Pastoral Company.

== History ==
The locality was officially named and bounded by the Minister for Natural Resources and Mines on 25 May 2001.

== Demographics ==
In the 2016 census, Gidya had "no people or a very low population".

In the 2021 census, Gidya had "no people or a very low population".

== Education ==
There are no schools in Gidya nor nearby. The options are distance education and boarding school.
