= Crotopsalta leptotigris =

Scientific classification
- Kingdom: Animalia
- Phylum: Arthropoda
- Clade: Pancrustacea
- Class: Insecta
- Order: Hemiptera
- Suborder: Auchenorrhyncha
- Family: Cicadidae
- Genus: Crotopsalta
- Species: C. leptotigris

Binomial name
- Crotopsalta leptotigris Ewart, 2009

Species of cicada

Crotopsalta leptotigris is a species of cicada, also known as the Cravens Peak ticker, in the true cicada family, Cicadettinae subfamily and Cicadettini tribe. It is endemic to Australia. It was described in 2009 by Australian entomologist Anthony Ewart.

== Description ==
The length of the forewing is 10–12 mm.

== Distribution and habitat ==
The species is only known from the vicinity of Pilungah Reserve (formerly Cravens Peak Reserve), on the north-eastern edge of the Simpson Desert, in western Queensland. The associated habitat is open grassland.

== Behaviour ==
Adults emerge following rainfall, and have been heard in February, clinging to grass stems and shrubs, uttering high-pitched, slow, ticking calls.
