= Four Ways, Queensland =

Four Ways
- Suburb
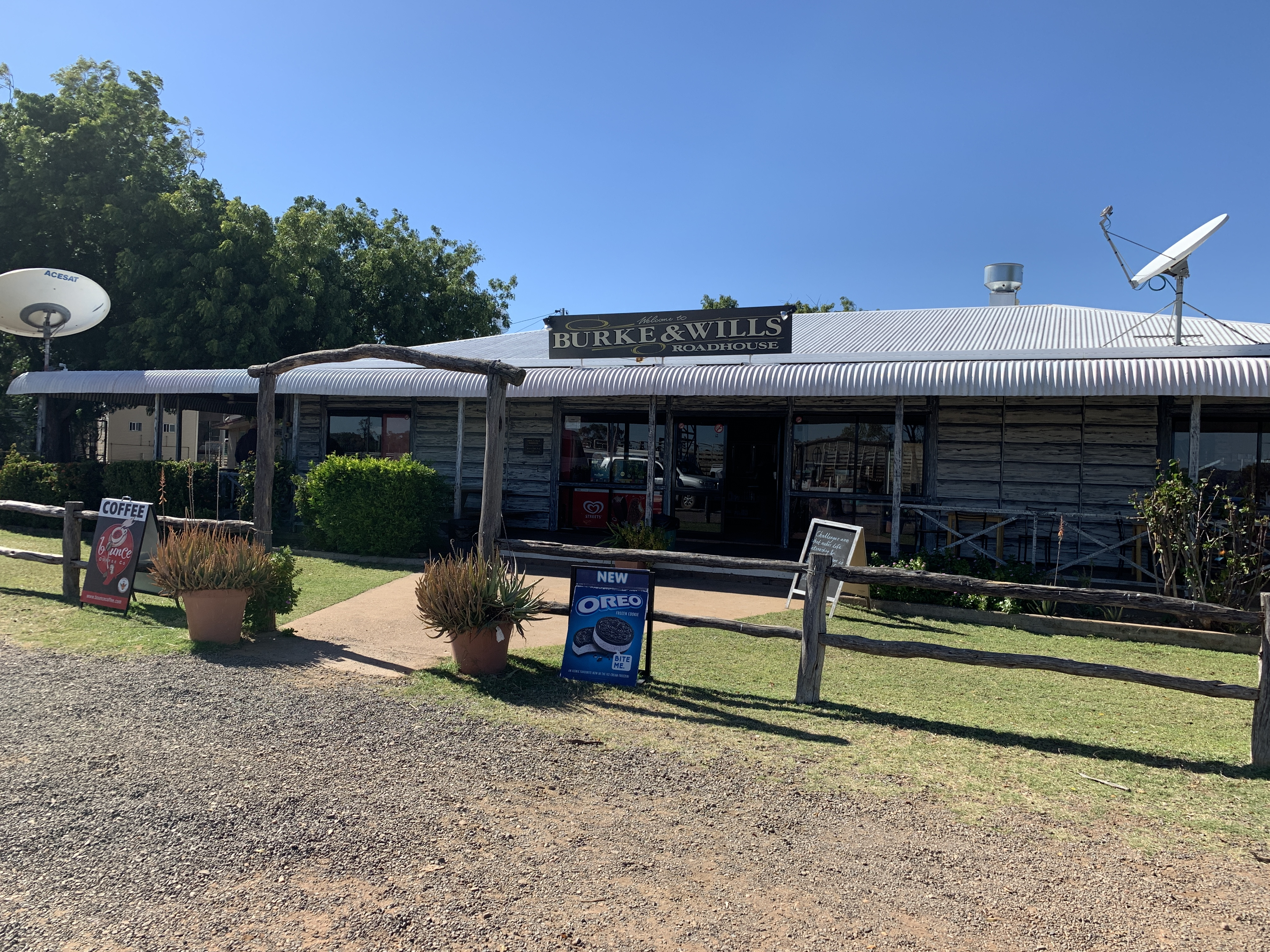
- Burke and Willis Roadhouse, 2019

- Interactive map of Four Ways
- Coordinates: 19.3533°S 140.4733°E
- Country: Australia
- State: Queensland
- LGA: Shire of Cloncurry
- Location: 183 km (114 mi) N of Cloncurry; 199 km (124 mi) SW of Normanton; 300 km (190 mi) NNE of Mount Isa; 885 km (550 mi) W of Townsville; 1,868 km (1,161 mi) NW of Brisbane

Government
  - State electorate: Traeger
  - Federal division: Kennedy

Area
  - Total: 6,028.9 km^{2} (2,327.8 sq mi)

Population
  - Total: 76 (2021 census)
  - Density: 0.01261/km^{2} (0.03265/sq mi)
- Time zone: UTC+10:00 (AEST)
- Postcode: 4824
Suburbs around Four Ways
Stokes	Stokes	Stokes
Gidya	Four Ways	Taldora
Three Rivers	Three Rivers	Taldora

Four Ways is an outback locality in the Shire of Cloncurry, Queensland, Australia. In the 2021 census, Four Ways had a population of 76 people.

== Geography ==
The name Four Ways refers to the Burke Developmental Road which passes south-west to north through the locality with two junctions to the Burketown Road to the north-west and the Wills Developmental Road to the south-east.

The locality is bounded by the Leichhardt River to the west and by the Flinders River to the east.

A watershed running from north to south through the locality separates two drainage basins. The Alexandra River rises in the south-west of the locality and flows north to become a tributary of the Leichhardt River which flows into the Gulf of Carpentaria. While in the eastern part of the locality, Dismal Creek and the Cloncurry River flow from south to north-east ultimately becoming tributaries of the Flinders River which also flows into the Gulf of Carpentaria.

There are two named mountains in the south of the locality:

- Pigeon House Mountain (19.5480°S 140.2266°E) at 190 metres (620 ft) above sea level
- The Knob (19.5519°S 140.4816°E) at 130 metres (430 ft) above sea level

There are also two named plains in the locality

- Madcap Plain in the south (19.5166°S 140.55°E) at 80 metres (260 ft) above sea level
- Walla Plain in the south-east (19.5833°S 140.8333°E) at 70 metres (230 ft) above sea level

The land use is grazing on native vegetation.

== Demographics ==
In the 2016 census, Four Ways had a population of 15 people.

In the 2021 census, Four Ways had a population of 76 people.

== Education ==
There are no schools within the locality nor nearby. Distance education and boarding schools would be the options.

== Attractions ==
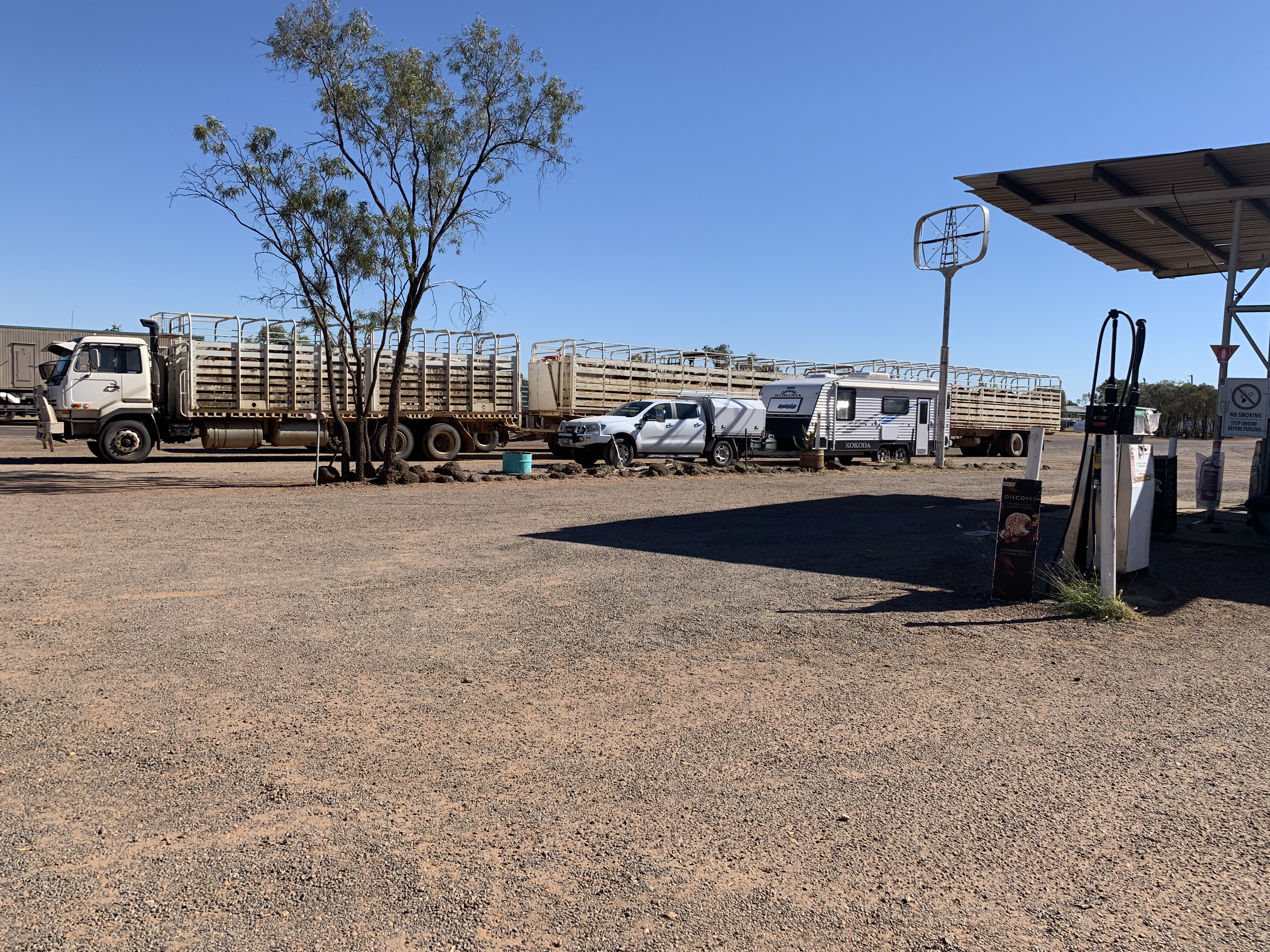
Burke and Willis Roadhouse looking towards the Burke Developmental Road, 2019

The Burke and Wills Roadhouse at the Burke and Wills Junction where the "four ways" meet (19.2272°S 140.3476°E) is a popular stopping place on these long road routes. It has basic accommodation, meals, fuel, groceries and souvenirs.
