= Crotopsalta plexis =

Scientific classification
- Kingdom: Animalia
- Phylum: Arthropoda
- Clade: Pancrustacea
- Class: Insecta
- Order: Hemiptera
- Suborder: Auchenorrhyncha
- Family: Cicadidae
- Genus: Crotopsalta
- Species: C. plexis

Binomial name
- Crotopsalta plexis Ewart, 2005

Species of cicada

Crotopsalta plexis is a species of cicada, also known as the wilga ticker, in the true cicada family, Cicadettinae subfamily and Cicadettini tribe. It is endemic to Australia. It was described in 2005 by Australian entomologist Anthony Ewart.

== Etymology ==
The specific epithet plexis comes from Greek plexi(s) ('stroke' or 'percussion') with reference to the slow, ticking song.

== Description ==
The length of the forewing is 11–14 mm.

== Distribution and habitat ==
The species occurs in the Brigalow Belt of southern inland Queensland, extending southwards to Moree in northern New South Wales. The associated habitat includes woodland and dry shrubland, especially areas with Geijera parviflora (wilga).

== Behaviour ==
Adults may be heard from late August to February, clinging to the outer foliage of trees and shrubs, uttering slow tlicking calls.
