= Crotopsalta =

Scientific classification
- Kingdom: Animalia
- Phylum: Arthropoda
- Clade: Pancrustacea
- Class: Insecta
- Order: Hemiptera
- Suborder: Auchenorrhyncha
- Family: Cicadidae
- Subfamily: Cicadettinae
- Genus: Crotopsalta; Ewart, 2005

Genus of cicadas

Crotopsalta is a genus of cicadas, also known as tickers, in the family Cicadidae, subfamily Cicadettinae and tribe Cicadettini. It is endemic to Australia. It was described in 2005 by Australian entomologist Anthony Ewart.

== Etymology ==
The genus name Crotopsalta is a combination derived from Greek croto (a ticking or rattling sound), with reference to the species’ songs, and psalta, a traditional suffix used in the generic names of many cicada species.

== Species ==
As of 2025 there were five described species in the genus:

- Crotopsalta fronsecetes Ewart, 2005 (Eastern Ticker)
- Crotopsalta leptotigris Ewart, 2009 (Cravens Peak Ticker)
- Crotopsalta plexis Ewart, 2005 (Wilga Ticker)
- Crotopsalta poaecetes Ewart, 2005 (Cloncurry Ticker)
- Crotopsalta strenulum Ewart, 2005 (Rapid Ticker)
