= Crotopsalta fronsecetes =

Scientific classification
- Kingdom: Animalia
- Phylum: Arthropoda
- Clade: Pancrustacea
- Class: Insecta
- Order: Hemiptera
- Suborder: Auchenorrhyncha
- Family: Cicadidae
- Genus: Crotopsalta
- Species: C. fronsecetes

Binomial name
- Crotopsalta fronsecetes Ewart, 2005

Species of cicada

Crotopsalta fronsecetes is a species of cicada, also known as the eastern ticker, in the true cicada family, Cicadettinae subfamily and Cicadettini tribe. It is endemic to Australia. It was described in 2005 by Australian entomologist Anthony Ewart.

== Etymology ==
The specific epithet fronsecetes is a combination of Latin frons and Greek ecetes, meaning 'foliage dweller'.

== Description ==
The length of the forewing is 11–14 mm.

== Distribution and habitat ==
The species' range extends from Mackay, Queensland southwards to Greater Brisbane and the New South Wales border. The associated habitat includes open eucalypt forest, areas of Casuarina glauca, and heathland.

== Behaviour ==
Adults may be heard from September to January, clinging to the outer branches and foliage of trees and shrubs, uttering high-frequency clicking calls.
