= Dobbyn =

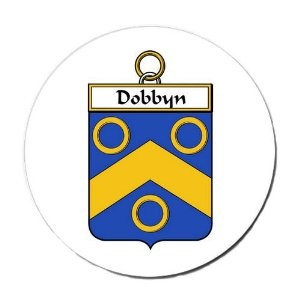
Dobbyn coat of arms

Dobbyn is a surname, and it reached number 72 in the Top 100 Surnames of the world.

Notable people with the surname include:

- Dave Dobbyn (born 1957), New Zealand musician and singer–songwriter
- John F. Dobbyn, US mystery writer

Place names:

- Dobbyn, Queensland, a mining ghost town in Australia
