= Crotopsalta strenulum =

Scientific classification
- Kingdom: Animalia
- Phylum: Arthropoda
- Clade: Pancrustacea
- Class: Insecta
- Order: Hemiptera
- Suborder: Auchenorrhyncha
- Family: Cicadidae
- Genus: Crotopsalta
- Species: C. strenulum

Binomial name
- Crotopsalta strenulum Ewart, 2005

Species of cicada

Crotopsalta strenulum is a species of cicada, also known as the rapid ticker, in the true cicada family, Cicadettinae subfamily and Cicadettini tribe. It is endemic to Australia. It was described in 2005 by Australian entomologist Anthony Ewart.

== Etymology ==
The specific epithet strenulum comes from Latin strenu ('active') with the diminutive suffix -ulum, referring to the active behaviour and small size of the species.

== Description ==
The length of the forewing is 10–12 mm.

== Distribution and habitat ==
The species occurs in central and southern Queensland from Carnarvon Gorge to the Toowoomba Region. The associated habitat includes grassy woodland and open grassland.

== Behaviour ==
Adults may be heard from October to February, clinging to grass stems, low vegetation and fence posts, uttering rapid ticking calls that are only audible at close range.
