= Mount Elliott =

Mount Elliott may refer to:

- Mount Elliott (Antarctica)
- Mount Elliott (British Columbia)
- Mount Elliott (Queensland)
- Mount Elliott Tool and Die
- Mount Elliott (Utah), a butte in Emory County, Utah

== See also ==
- Mount Elliot (disambiguation)
