= Quamby, Queensland =

Quamby
- Town
- Coordinates: 20.37139°S 140.28417°E
- Country: Australia
- State: Queensland
- LGA: Shire of Cloncurry
- Location: 45.7 km (28.4 mi) NNW of Cloncurry; 162 km (101 mi) ENE of Mount Isa; 830 km (520 mi) WSW of Townsville; 1,751 km (1,088 mi) NW of Brisbane

Government
  - State electorate: Traeger
  - Federal division: Kennedy
- Time zone: UTC+10:00 (AEST)
- Postcode: 4824

Quamby is a rural town in the Shire of Cloncurry in Northwest Queensland, Australia. It is 44 kilometres from the town of Cloncurry. The town rests on the eastern side of the Burke Developmental Road and these days consists of a solitary hotel, fifteen 'dongas' (single workers accommodation) and a handful of sheds, watertanks and memorabilia from nearby stations.

== Geography ==
Quamby is within to the Parish of Corella in the County of Beaconsfield.

== History ==
The Quamby hotel was originally built as a customs house in the 1860s and converted to a hotel somewhere around 1921. It was also used as a staging post for Cobb & Co stagecoaches who required fresh teams of horses every 10 – 30 miles.

The Quamby State School operated from 1924 until 1969.

In the 1930s, the town is reputed to have had 40 homes but the demise of the railway saw most of the existing buildings relocated as is common with the stumped, timber-frame houses of north Queensland.

In 1934, Quamby was also the scene of what was described at the time as a 'Shooting Affray'. Mr Charles Cameron, a schoolteacher, shot Mr James Croke after a dispute in Mr Croke's home. Croke was taken to hospital in a critical condition while Charles Cameron was later found dead in his hotel room at The Quamby Hotel. The police noted a pea rifle was nearby.

== Economy ==
Cattle grazing and mining are the significant industries in the region. Local pastoral holdings include 'Dipvale', 'Carsland', 'Malakoff' and 'Bannock Burn'.

Mining interests in the region have been predominantly gold and copper with many small operations existing since settlement.

A major zinc mine expansion is underway just north of Quamby at Dugald River. Project capital expenditure is expected to be in the range of US$1–1.25 billion. The mine has a 88 MW solar farm, and plans for a 144 MW wind farm, in order to reduce its operational costs of buying gas power from the Diamantina Power Station.

== Education ==
There are no schools in Quamby. The nearest government school is Cloncurry State School (Prep to Year 12) in the town of Cloncurry to the south. There is also a Catholic school in Cloncurry.

== Attractions ==
The historic feel extends to the interior of the hotel where old timber and floorboards have been used to make tables while donated saddles, horse shoes and old railway lights add decoration.

== Events ==
Quamby is on the Queensland Rodeo Circuit with novelty events such as the 'Donkey Ride' and 'Calf Scruffing' proving popular with competitors and spectators. It is held in July and attracts up to 1300 spectators and 280 competitors.
