= Three Rivers, Queensland =

Three Rivers
- Suburb
- Interactive map of Three Rivers
- Coordinates: 19.8473°S 140.1667°E
- Country: Australia
- State: Queensland
- LGA: Shire of Cloncurry
- Location: 100 km (62 mi) NW of Cloncurry; 118 km (73 mi) NE of Mount Isa; 1,805 km (1,122 mi) NW of Brisbane

Government
  - State electorate: Traeger
  - Federal division: Kennedy

Area
  - Total: 8,885.1 km^{2} (3,430.6 sq mi)

Population
  - Total: 93 (2021 census)
  - Density: 0.01047/km^{2} (0.02711/sq mi)
- Time zone: UTC+10:00 (AEST)
- Postcode: 4824
Suburbs around Three Rivers
Gidya	Four Ways	Four Ways
Gunpowder	Three Rivers	Taldora
Mount Isa (locality)	Cloncurry	Taldora

Three Rivers is an outback locality in the Shire of Cloncurry, Queensland, Australia. In the 2021 census, Three Rivers had a population of 93 people.

== Geography ==
There are three towns within Three Rivers:

- Dobbyn
- Kajabbi
- Mount Cuthbert

== Demographics ==
In the 2016 census, Three Rivers had a population of 27 people.

In the 2021 census, Three Rivers had a population of 93 people.

== Heritage listings ==
Three Rivers has a number of heritage-listed sites, including:

- Mount Cuthbert Township and Smelter

== Education ==
There are no schools in Three Rivers, nor nearby. The alternatives are distance education and boarding school.
