= Mount Elliott Mining Complex =

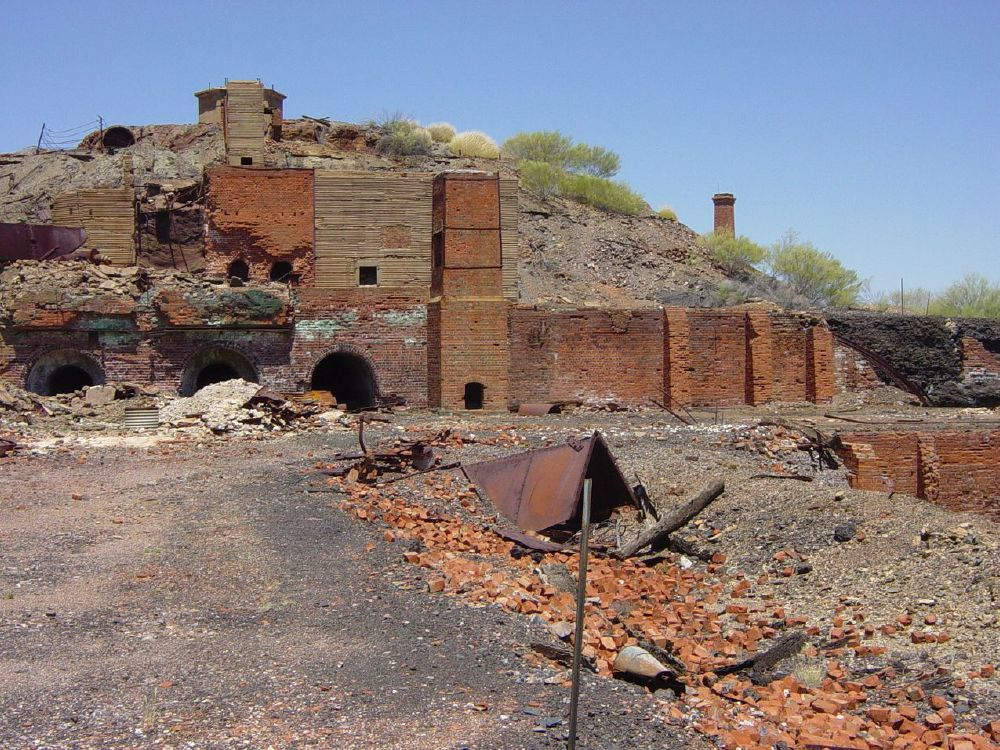
- Ruins, 2008

- Location within Queensland Location within Australia
- 21.5328°S 140.5035°E
- Location: Selwyn, Shire of Cloncurry, Queensland, Australia

History
- Design period: 1900 - 1914 (early 20th century)
- Built: 1908

Site notes
- Architect: William Henry Corbould

Queensland Heritage Register
- Official name: Mount Elliott Mining Complex, Mount Elliott Smelter, Selwyn
- Type: archaeological (landscape, built)
- Designated: 16 September 2011
- Reference no.: 700012
- Significant period: 1906 - 1953
- Significant components: machinery/plant/equipment - mining/mineral processing, embankment - tramway, kiln, smelter, boiler room/boiler house, building foundations/ruins, cemetery, garden - bed/s, slab/s - concrete, tank stand

Mount Elliott Mining Complex is a heritage-listed copper mine and smelter at Selwyn, Shire of Cloncurry, Queensland, Australia. It was designed by William Henry Corbould and built in 1908. It is also known as Mount Elliott Smelter and Selwyn. It was added to the Queensland Heritage Register on 16 September 2011.

== History ==
The Mount Elliott Mining Complex is an aggregation of the remnants of copper mining and smelting operations from the early 20th century and the associated former mining township of Selwyn. The earliest copper mining at Mount Elliott was in 1906 with smelting operations commencing shortly after. Significant upgrades to the mining and smelting operations occurred under the management of W.H. Corbould during 1909–1910. Following these upgrades and increases in production, the Selwyn Township grew quickly and had 1500 residents by 1918. The Mount Elliott Company took over other companies on the Cloncurry field in the 1920s, including the Mount Cuthbert and Kuridala/Hampden smelters. Mount Elliott operations were taken over by Mount Isa Mines in 1943 to ensure the supply of copper during World War Two. The Mount Elliott Company was eventually liquidated in 1953.

=== Mount Elliott Smelter ===
The existence of copper in the Leichhardt River area of north western Queensland had been known since Ernest Henry discovered the Great Australia Mine in 1867 at Cloncurry. In 1899 James Elliott discovered copper on the conical hill that became Mount Elliott, but having no capital to develop the mine, he sold an interest to James Morphett, a pastoralist of Fort Constantine station near Cloncurry. Morphett, being drought-stricken, in turn sold out to John Moffat of Irvinebank, the most successful mining promoter in Queensland at the time.

Plentiful capital and cheap transport were prerequisites for developing the Cloncurry field, which had stagnated for forty years. Without capital it was impossible to explore and prove ore-bodies; without proof of large reserves of wealth it was futile to build a railway; and without a railway it was hazardous to invest capital in finding large reserves of ore. The mining investor or the railway builder had to break the impasse.

In 1906–1907 copper averaged £87 a ton on the London market, the highest price for thirty years, and the Cloncurry field grew. The Great Northern railway was extended west of Richmond in 1905–1906 by the Queensland Government and mines were floated on the Melbourne Stock Exchange. At Mount Elliott a prospecting shaft had been sunk and on 1 August 1906 a Cornish boiler and winding plant were installed on the site.

Mount Elliott Limited was floated in Melbourne on 13 July 1906. In 1907 it was taken over by British and French interests and restructured. Combining with its competitor, Hampden Cloncurry Copper Mines Limited, Mount Elliott formed a special company to finance and construct the railway from Cloncurry to Malbon, Kuridala (then Friezeland) and Mount Elliott (later Selwyn). This new company then entered into an agreement with the Queensland Railways Department in July 1908.

The Selwyn railway, which was known as the "Syndicate Railway", aroused opposition in 1908 from the trade unions and Labor movement generally, who contended that railways should be State-owned. However, the Hampden-Mount Elliott Railway Bill was passed by the Queensland Parliament and assented to on 21 April 1908; construction finished in December 1910. The railway terminated at the Mount Elliott smelter.

By 1907 the main underlie shaft had been sunk and construction of the smelters was underway using a second-hand water-jacket blast furnace and converters. At this time, W.H. Corbould was appointed general manager of Mount Elliott Limited.

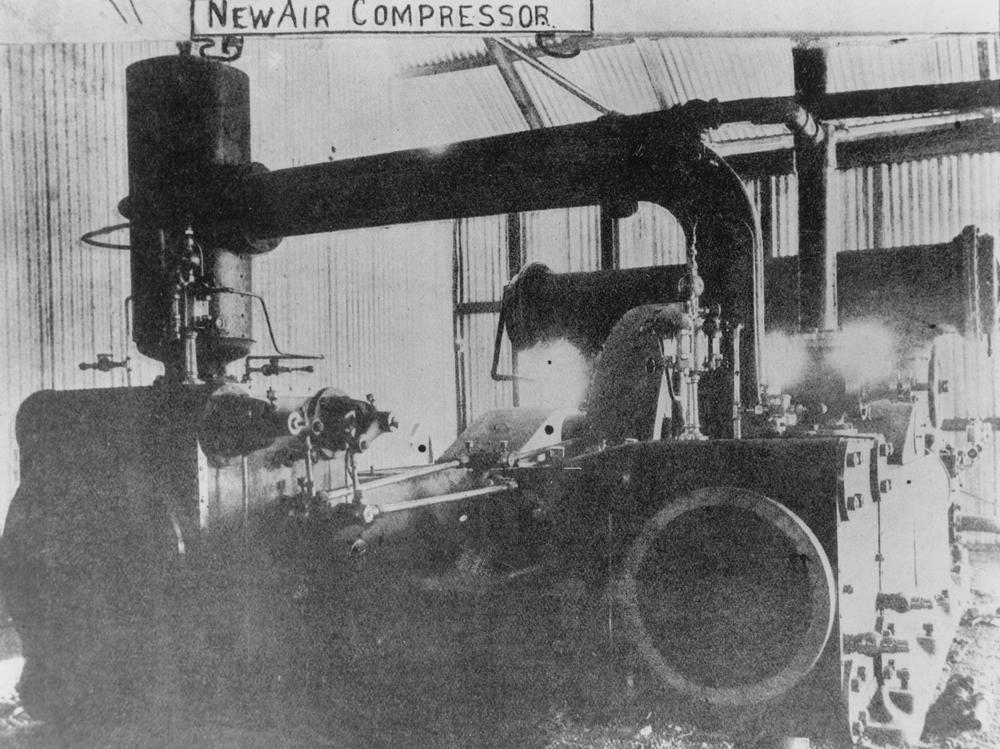
New air compressor at the smelting works, 1909

The second-hand blast furnace and converters were commissioned or "blown in" in May 1909, but were problematic causing hold-ups. Corbould referred to the equipment in use as being the "worst collection of worn-out junk he had ever come across". Corbould soon convinced his directors to scrap the plant and let him design new works.

Corbould was a metallurgist and geologist as well as mine/smelter manager. He foresaw a need to obtain control and thereby ensure a reliable supply of ore from a cross-section of mines in the region. He also saw a need to implement an effective strategy to manage the economies of smelting low-grade ore. Smelting operations in the region were made difficult by the technical and economic problems posed by the deterioration in the grade of ore. Corbould resolved the issue by a process of blending ores with different chemical properties, increasing the throughput capacity of the smelter and by championing the unification of smelting operations in the region. In 1912, Corbould acquired Hampden Consols Mine at Kuridala for Mount Elliott Limited, followed with the purchases of other small mines in the district.

Walkers Limited of Maryborough was commissioned to manufacture a new 200 long tons (200 t) water jacket furnace for the smelters. An air compressor and blower for the smelters were constructed in the powerhouse and an electric motor and dynamo provided power for the crane and lighting for the smelter and mine.

The new smelter was blown in September 1910, a month after the first train arrived, and it ran well, producing 2,040 long tons (2,070 t) of blister copper by the end of the year. The new smelting plant made it possible to cope with low-grade sulphide ores at Mount Elliott. The use of 1,000 long tons (1,000 t) of low-grade sulphide ores bought from the Hampden Consols Mine in 1911 made it clear that if a supply of higher sulphur ore could be obtained and blended, performance and economy would improve. Accordingly, the company bought a number of smaller mines in the district in 1912.

Corbould mined with cut and fill stoping but a young Mines Inspector condemned the system, ordered it dismantled and replaced with square set timbering. In 1911, after gradual movement in stopes on the No.3 level, the smelter was closed for two months. Nevertheless, 5,447 long tons (5,534 t) of blister copper was produced in 1911, rising to 6,690 long tons (6,800 t) in 1912 - the company's best year. Many of the surviving structures at the site were built at this time.

Troubles for Mount Elliott started in 1913. In February, a fire at the Consols Mine closed it for months. In June, a thirteen-week strike closed the whole operation, severely depleting the workforce. The year 1913 was also bad for industrial accidents in the area, possibly due to inexperienced people replacing the strikers. Nevertheless, the company paid generous dividends that year.

At the end of 1914 smelting ceased for more than a year due to shortage of ore. Although 3,200 long tons (3,300 t) of blister copper was produced in 1913, production fell to 1,840 long tons (1,870 t) in 1914 and the workforce dwindled to only 40 men. For the second half of 1915 and early 1916 the smelter treated ore railed south from Mount Cuthbert. At the end of July 1916 the smelting plant at Selwyn was dismantled except for the flue chambers and stacks. A new furnace with a capacity of 500 long tons (510 t) per day was built, a large amount of second-hand equipment was obtained and the converters were increased in size.

After the enlarged furnace was commissioned in June 1917, continuing industrial unrest retarded production which amounted to only 1,000 long tons (1,000 t) of copper that year. The point of contention was the efficiency of the new smelter which processed twice as much ore while employing fewer men. The company decided to close down the smelter in October and reduce the size of the furnace, the largest in Australia, from 6.5 to 5.5 metres (21 to 18 ft). In the meantime the price of copper had almost doubled from 1916 due to wartime consumption of munitions.

The new furnace commenced on 16 January 1918 and 77,482 long tons (78,725 t) of ore were smelted yielding 3,580 long tons (3,640 t) of blister copper which were sent to the Bowen refinery before export to Britain. Local coal and coke supply was a problem and materials were being sourced from the distant Bowen Colliery. The smelter had a good run for almost a year except for a strike in July and another in December, which caused Corbould to close down the plant until New Year. In 1919, following relaxation of wartime controls by the British Metal Corporation, the copper price plunged from about £110 per ton at the start of the year to £75 per ton in April, dashing the company's optimism regarding treatment of low grade ores. The smelter finally closed after two months operation and most employees were laid off.

For much of the period 1919 to 1922, Corbould was in England trying to raise capital to reorganise the company's operations but he failed and resigned from the company in 1922. The Mount Elliott Company took over the assets of the other companies on the Cloncurry field in the 1920s - Mount Cuthbert in 1925 and Kuridala in 1926. Mount Isa Mines bought the Mount Elliott plant and machinery, including the three smelters, in 1943 for £2,300, enabling them to start copper production in the middle of the Second World War. The Mount Elliott Company was finally liquidated in 1953.

In 1950 A.E. Powell took up the Mount Elliott Reward Claim at Selwyn and worked close to the old smelter buildings. An open cut mine commenced at Starra, south of Mount Elliott and Selwyn, in 1988 and is Australia's third largest copper producer producing copper-gold concentrates from flotation and gold bullion from carbon-in-leach processing.

Profitable copper-gold ore bodies were recently proved at depth beneath the Mount Elliott smelter and old underground workings by Cyprus Gold Australia Pty Ltd. These deposits were subsequently acquired by Arimco Mining Pty Ltd for underground development which commenced in July 1993. A decline tunnel portal, ore and overburden dumps now occupy a large area of the Maggie Creek valley south-west of the smelter which was formerly the site of early miner's camps.

=== Selwyn Township ===
In 1907, the first hotel, run by H. Williams, was opened at the site. The township was surveyed later, around 1910, by the Queensland Mines Department. The town was to be situated north of the mine and smelter operations adjacent the railway, about 1.5 kilometres (0.93 mi) distant. It took its name from the nearby Selwyn Ranges which were named, during Burke's expedition, after the Victorian Government Geologist, Alfred Richard Cecil Selwyn. The town has also been known by the name of Mount Elliott, after the nearby mines and smelter.

Many of the residents either worked at the Mount Elliott Mine and Smelter or worked in the service industries which grew around the mining and smelting operations. Little documentation exists about the everyday life of the town's residents. Surrounding sheep and cattle stations, however, meant that meat was available cheaply and vegetables grown in the area were delivered to the township by horse and cart. Imported commodities were, however, expensive.

By 1910 the town had four hotels. There was also an aerated water manufacturer, three stores, four fruiterers, a butcher, baker, saddler, garage, police, hospital, banks, post office (officially from 1906 to 1928, then unofficially until 1975) and a railway station. There was even an orchestra of ten players in 1912. The population of Selwyn rose from 1000 in 1911 to 1500 in 1918, before gradually declining.

== Description ==
=== Mount Elliott Smelter ===
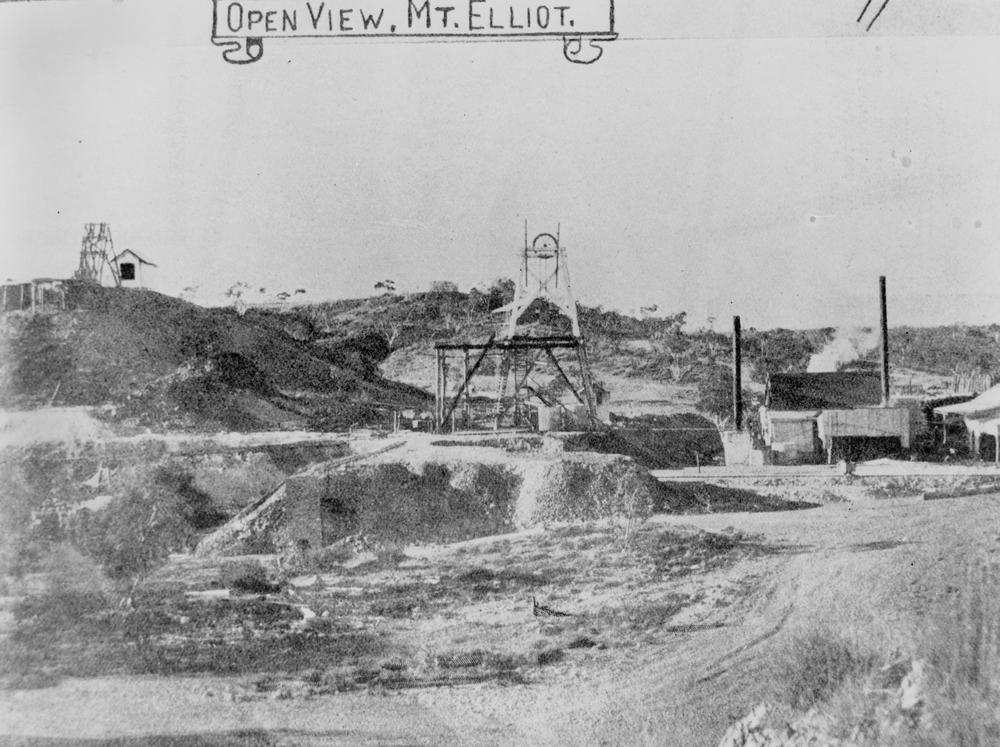
Mt Elliott Mine, 1909

Mount Elliott Smelter is located in Cloncurry Shire, approximately one kilometre south of the former township of Selwyn, and 95 kilometres (59 mi) south of Cloncurry. The main processing infrastructure and remains are centralised on the northern side of the low hill known as Mount Elliott.

Immediately north of the main processing complex is a shallow basin formed by natural rises in ground. Within this basin lay the powerhouse and boiler house machinery beds, ore tunnel, beehive kiln, the lower condenser area and railway embankments.

To the east of the central complex are the remains of an assay office, furnaces, one possible and one identifiable explosives magazine, the upper condenser bank, tank stands, and the remains of a substantial residence.

To the south-west, on the central low hill, are the remains of a winder engine machine-bed, a square brick stack that served the boilers of the winder complex, and the single remaining bed and footings of the primary ore crusher.

Further west on low ridges are the remains of a strong room, office, stone tank stand and smithy.

=== Selwyn Township ===
The Selwyn Township is located at the northern end of a valley running south to Mount Elliott Smelter which is about 1.5 kilometres (0.93 mi) distant. All buildings have been removed and the evidence of the township now comprises garden plots, cement surfaces and corrugated iron water tanks.

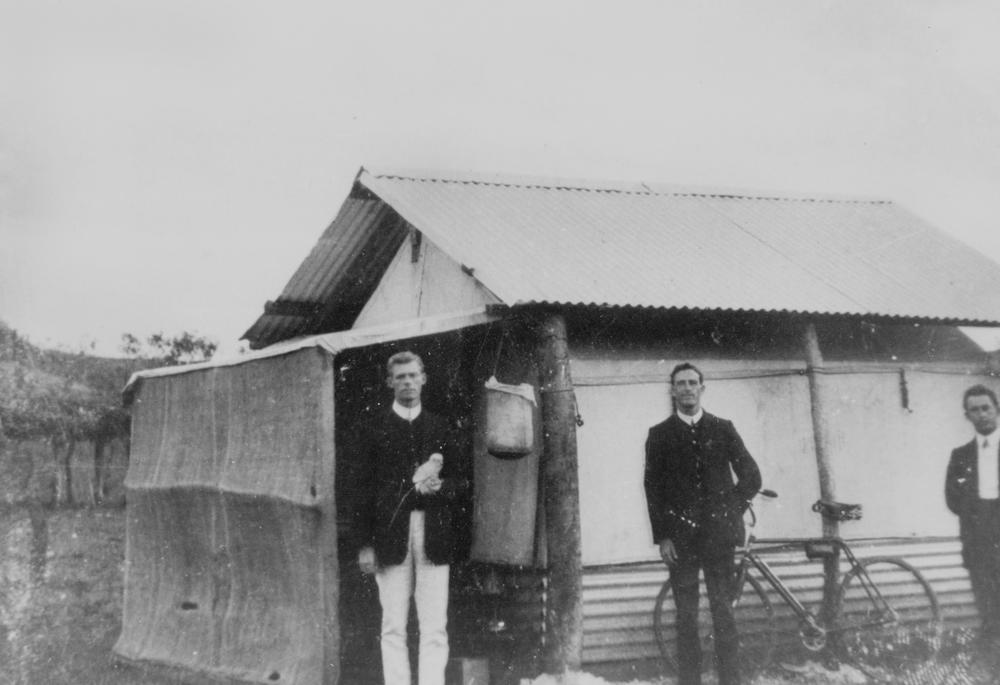
Teacher and friends standing near a dwelling at Mount Elliott, 1905

The site of the Union Hotel remains identifiable and the timber stumps of the stationmaster's house, the railway formation and surviving timber sleepers are among the most visible remains. The railway embankment follows the eastern side of the valley between the town and smelter passing several miners' hut sites comprising rough stone walls, and benched surfaces with stone retaining walls.

Identifiable sites in the valley include a cement surface formerly under the high-set school building, the police station site, and the original smelter site at the base of a hill on the western side of the valley.

The town cemetery, about 200 metres (660 ft) south-east of the town, contains about fifteen headstones in separate sections for Catholics and Protestants. All but one headstone are from Melrose & Fenwick of Townsville. The grave sites include three women, a returned Anzac accidentally killed in the mine, a man who died of injuries in the local hospital, and a miner from Mount Cobalt who was buried in 1925 after Selwyn was almost deserted.

== Heritage listing ==
Mount Elliott Mining Complex was listed on the Queensland Heritage Register on 16 September 2011 having satisfied the following criteria.

The Mount Elliott Mining Complex, incorporating the remnants of the Mount Elliott Mine, Smelter, a range of associated infrastructure, scattered archaeological artefacts, the abandoned town of Selwyn and its associated cemetery, has the potential to provide important information on aspects of Queensland's history particularly early copper smelter practices and technologies, the full range of activities peripheral to those base operations and, importantly, the people who lived and worked in this complex historic mining landscape.

The Mount Elliott Mining Complex has sufficient archaeological integrity and diversity in its assemblage to facilitate detailed studies which would reveal the largely undocumented social and cultural aspects of the occupation and use of the mine, smelter and Selwyn Township areas. Important research questions could focus on, but are not limited to, cultural identity and ethnicity, socioeconomic status, individual and collective living conditions, and individual adaptations to the remoteness and harshness of the local environment.

Archaeological investigations within the Mount Elliott Mining Complex have potential to reveal specific details about the function and use of the area that complement and augment archival records. Investigations of the remnant mining and smelting infrastructure may help answer important research questions relating to mining and smelting operations including, but not limited to:

- the design and operation of an early primary ore-processing plant, base metals mine and smelting operation in Queensland
- adaptation of work practices due to remoteness, harshness and the local environment
- fundamental and influential changes to copper mining and smelting practice in Queensland initiated by Mount Elliott's manager W.R. Corbould (1907–1922), especially the use of more efficient and economical production techniques compared to other similar operations

The Mount Elliott Mining Complex is an important component of a broader historic mining landscape as operations at Mount Elliott helped initiate extractive and primary processing industries in the Cloncurry region and north-west Queensland generally. The remnant infrastructure, mining artefacts, and the remains of the mining township of Selwyn have potential for important comparative material to other mining sites in the region, particularly the nearby Hampden Company Smelter at Kuridala and Mount Cuthbert Township and Smelter. Archaeological investigations at the Mount Elliott Mining Complex may reveal new information that expands our understanding of such enterprises and on the everyday lives of the people living and working at such sites across Queensland.

== See also ==
- Mount Elliott Company Metallurgical Plant and Mill
- Mount Elliott mine
