= Mount Elliott mine =

Mine in Australia

Coordinates: 21.5000°S 140.5167°E

- Interactive map of Mount Elliott mine
- Location: Queensland, Australia
- Products: Copper and gold
- Company: Chinova

The Mount Elliott mine is a large copper mine located near Selwyn, Shire of Cloncurry, Queensland, Australia, 100 kilometres (62 mi) south of Cloncurry. Mount Elliott represents one of the largest copper reserves in Australia and in the world having estimated reserves of 475 million tonnes of ore grading 0.5% copper and 4.56 million oz of gold.

The mine is owned by Chinova.

Mining at the site has been intermittent with operations beginning in the early 1900s. Mining last occurred at Mount Elliott in 2003.

For the history of the mine complex:

- Mount Elliott Mining Complex;
- Mount Elliott Company Metallurgical Plant and Mill.

== See also ==
- List of mines in Australia
- Mining in Australia
