= William Henry Corbould =

Australian mining engineer

William Corbould
- Born: 4 November 1866; Ballarat, Victoria, Australia
- Died: 16 March 1949 (aged 82); Nice, France
- Education: Ballarat School of Mines
- Occupation: Mining engineer
- Spouse: Una Dodds (m. 1896; died 1948)

William Henry Corbould (4 November 1866 – 16 March 1949) was an Australian mining engineer and company executive. He played a key role in the establishment of Mount Isa Mines in Queensland.

== Early life ==
Corbould was born on 4 November 1866 in Ballarat, Victoria. He was the son of Julia Augusta (née Signall) and William Corbould, a tailor. He left school at the age of twelve but later obtained a certificate in chemistry at the Ballarat School of Mines. From 1885 he worked at the Central Mine in Broken Hill, New South Wales, as an assayist and chemist.

== Career ==
Corbould spent time in the United States, Europe and South Africa in the early 1890s. He returned to Australia and by 1895 was manager of Paddy Hannan's Reward mine in Kalgoorlie, Western Australia. In about 1902 he was appointed manager of the Burraga copper mine in New South Wales.

=== Mount Elliott ===
In 1909 Corbould was appointed general manager of the Mount Elliott Mine near Cloncurry, Queensland. He turned the mine into "one of the most profitable operations in the Commonwealth", paying over £400,000 (equivalent to $54,900,000 in 2022) in dividends between 1910 and 1913. He was subsequently appointed managing director of Mount Elliott Ltd, the mine's London-based holding company, a position he held until 1922.

After a copper boom during World War I, Corbould faced a number of challenges including falling commodity prices, strikes, and the exhaustion of rich surface orebodies. By 1918 Mount Elliott Ltd was unprofitable, which Corbould attributed in part to labour troubles. In an interview with The North Queensland Register he claimed that the Australian Workers' Union (AWU) had been infiltrated by "Wobblies" and "Bolshie-Joes" attempting to cripple the mining industry. He was widely rumoured to have lobbied the federal government for the deportation of strike leader Paul Freeman, although both he and the government denied this.

=== Mount Isa ===
In 1924, Corbould floated Mount Isa Mines Ltd (MIM) in Sydney. He had been invited to tour the field, assessing the ore bodies discovered by John Campbell Miles as similar to those at Broken Hill. He was appointed director and general manager of the new company, supervising the exploratory work and raising capital. Corbould played a key role in consolidating MIM's ground, engineering the acquisition of Randolph Bedford's Mount Isa Proprietary Ltd. He also convinced the state government to extend the Great Northern Railway from Duchess to service the mine. He resigned from the company in 1927 but lived to see it pay its first dividend in 1947.

== Personal life ==
In 1896, Corbould married Una Robina Dodds, with whom he had four children – two daughters, one of whom died in infancy, and twin sons. He was widowed in 1948 and died in Nice, France, on 16 March 1949, aged 82. His son Ted Corbould was a prominent pastoralist and philanthropist.
