= Shire of Cloncurry =

Coordinates: 20°42′16″S 140°30′20″E

- Local government area
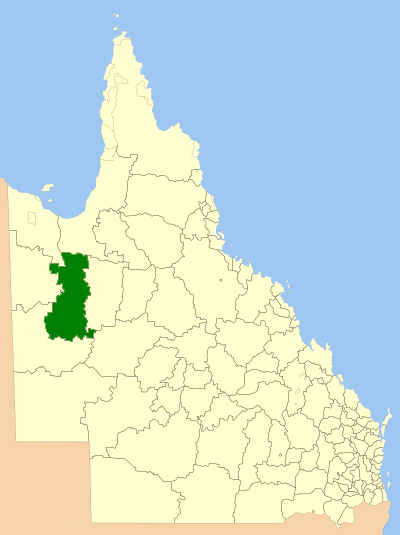
- Location within Queensland

- Interactive map of Shire of Cloncurry
- Country: Australia
- State: Queensland
- Region: North West Queensland
- Established: 1884
- Council seat: Cloncurry

Government
  - Mayor: Greg Campbell
  - State electorate: Traeger
  - Federal division: Kennedy

Area
  - Total: 47,971 km^{2} (18,522 sq mi)

Population
  - Total: 3,644 (2021 census)
  - Density: 0.075963/km^{2} (0.196742/sq mi)
- Website: Shire of Cloncurry
LGAs around Shire of Cloncurry
Burke	Carpentaria	Carpentaria
Mount Isa	Shire of Cloncurry	McKinlay
Boulia	Boulia	Winton

The Shire of Cloncurry is a local government area in North West Queensland, Australia. It covers an area of 47,971 square kilometres (18,521.7 sq mi), and has existed as a local government entity since 1884. The major town and administrative centre of the shire is Cloncurry.

Prior to European settlement the area was home to the Mitakoodi, Kalkadoon and Pitta Pitta Aboriginal people.

The ghost town of Mary Kathleen, a town servicing a uranium mine since closed, is in the shire.

In the 2021 census, the Shire of Cloncurry had a population of 3,644 people.

== History ==
Wanamarra (also known as Maykulan and Wunumura is an Australian Aboriginal language in North West Queensland. The language region includes areas within the Shire of McKinlay, Shire of Cloncurry and Shire of Richmond, including the Flinders River area, and the towns of Kynuna and Richmond.

Yulluna (also known as Yalarnga, Yalarrnga, Jalanga, Jalannga, Wonganja, Gunggalida, and Jokula) is an Australian Aboriginal language of the Gulf Country. The Yulluna language region includes the local government boundaries of the Shire of Cloncurry.

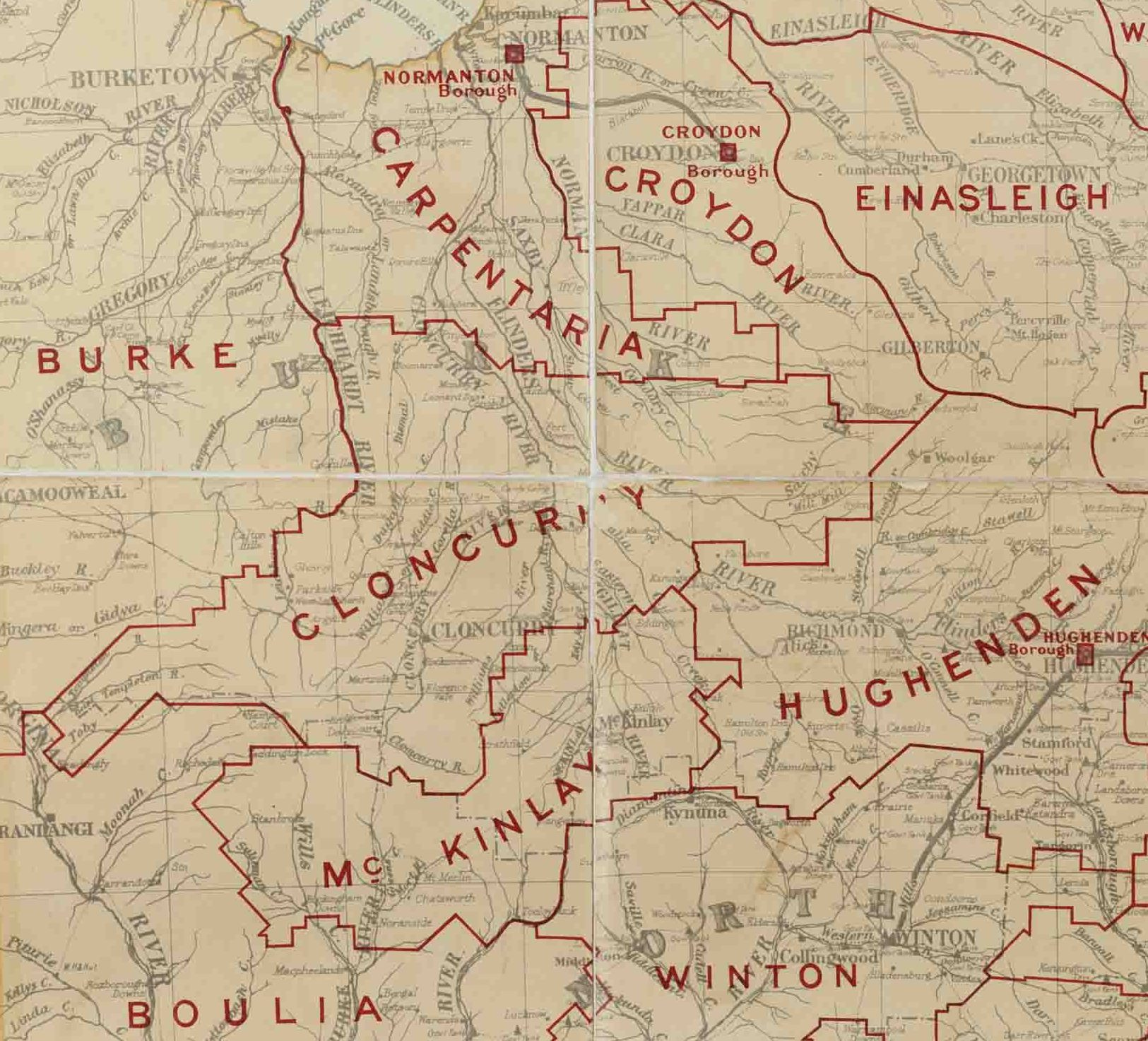
Map of Cloncurry Division and adjacent local government areas, March 1902

The first Europeans to visit the area were Wills and Burke in 1861, and the latter named the river Cloncurry after his cousin. In 1867, Ernest Henry wandered to this site in search of a grazing land and found copper. He is considered the founder of the town as well as its vast mineral deposits. In 1876, the town was named Cloncurry after the river. It is regarded as the place of innovations as Qantas began its operations here and the Royal Flying Doctor Service was established in Cloncurry in 1928.

The Doonmunya Division was created on 11 November 1879 as one of 74 divisions around Queensland under the Divisional Boards Act 1879 with a population of 396. However, the divisional board appeared to be completely inactive, perhaps because the division was so large (being the area surrounding the southern part of the Gulf of Carpentaria) and was very sparsely settled. Nonetheless some of the citizens were unhappy about this. Consequently, on 11 January 1883, the Doonmunya Division was abolished and a new Carpentaria Division was created to replace it.

Given the size of the Carpentaria Division, the distance to its headquarters in Normanton was an issue for residents in the Cloncurry area, leading to a desire to create their own local division. On 7 February 1884, part of Carpentaria Division was separated to create the new Cloncurry Division.

On 30 January 1885, adjustments were made to boundaries of the Cloncurry Division when the Burke Division was also split off from the Carpentaria Division.

On 31 March 1903, Cloncurry Division became the Shire of Cloncurry.

== Mining ==
Mining was an important for the growth and development of the region. There are a number of continuing functional mines in the region as well as some abandoned mines. The abandoned Lady Fanny mine was located in Kuridala. Some of the abandoned mines have been re-explored recently for mining potential.

== Libraries ==
The Cloncurry Shire Council operates a public library in Cloncurry.

== Towns and localities ==
The Shire of Cloncurry includes the following settlements:

- Cloncurry
- Dajarra
- Dobbyn
- Duchess
- Four Ways
- Kajabbi
- Kuridala
- Malbon
- Mount Cuthbert
- Selwyn
- The Monument
- Three Rivers

== Demographics ==
Year	Population	Notes
1933	6,184	
1947	6,267	
1954	3,052	
1961	4,869	
1966	3,348	
1971	3,623	
1976	4,036	
1981	3,651	
1986	3,194	
1991	3,382	
1996	3,878	
2001 census	4,797	
2006 census	3,138	
2011 census	3,229	
2016 census	3,032	
2021 census	3,644	

== Chairmen and mayors ==
- 1884: George Seymour
- 1919: J. Hedleffe
- 1927: Walter Angus Rose
- 2008–2016 : Andrew Daniels
- 2016: Gregory Vincent (Greg) Campbell

Other notable members of the council included:

- 1924–1930 (deputy chairman 1927–1930) Tom Aikens, Member of the Queensland Legislative Assembly for Munndingburra and Townsville South
