= Ernest Henry =

Ernest Henry may refer to:

- Ernest Henry (engineer) (1885-1950), Swiss mechanical engineer
- Ernest Henry (swimmer) (1904–1998), Australian freestyle swimmer
- Ernest Henry (explorer) (1837–1919), explorer of North-West Queensland

== Other uses ==
- Ernest Henry mine, Queensland, Australia
