= Cloncurry Courthouse =

Courthouse in Cloncurry, Queensland, Australia

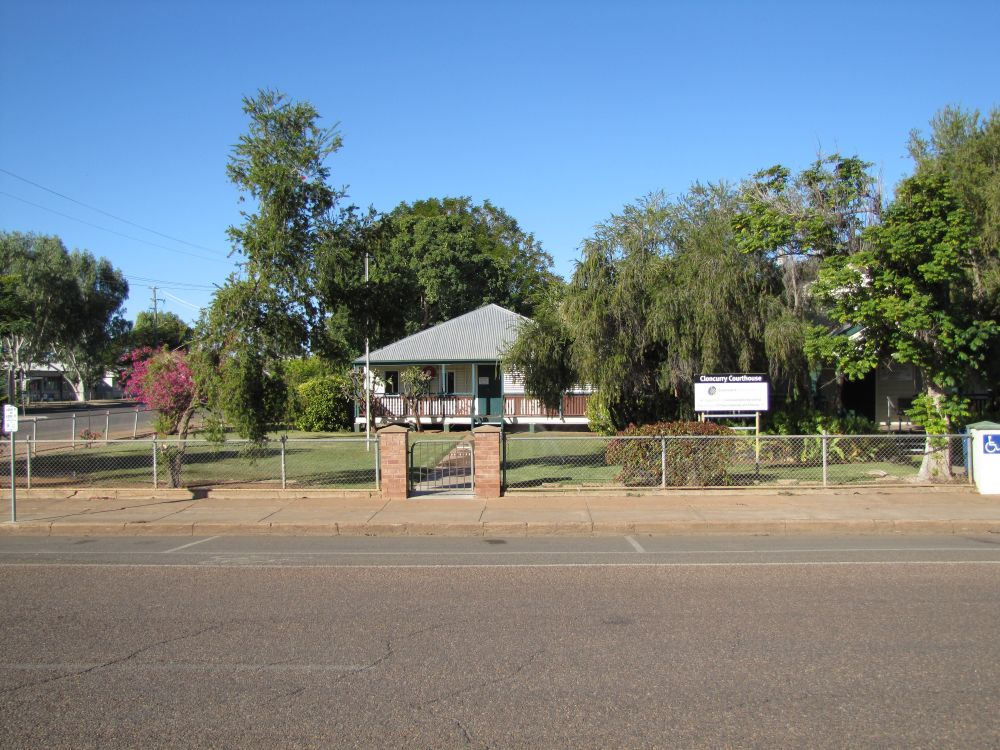
- Cloncurry Courthouse, 2013

- Location within Queensland Location within Australia
- 20.7048°S 140.506°E
- Location: 42–48 Daintree Street, Cloncurry, Shire of Cloncurry, Queensland, Australia

History
- Design period: 1870s–1890s (late 19th century)
- Built: 1897

Site notes
- Architect: Department of Public Works (Queensland)

Queensland Heritage Register
- Official name: Cloncurry Court House
- Type: state heritage (built)
- Designated: 21 October 1992
- Reference no.: 600415
- Significant period: 1890s (historical); 1890s–1910s (fabric)
- Significant components: office/s, court house
- Builders: Murray and Litster

Cloncurry Courthouse is a heritage-listed courthouse at 42–48 Daintree Street, Cloncurry, Shire of Cloncurry, Queensland, Australia. It was designed by Department of Public Works (Queensland) and built in 1897 by Murray and Litster. It is also known as Cloncurry Court House. It was added to the Queensland Heritage Register on 21 October 1992.

== History ==
The present Cloncurry Court House is the second on site and was erected in stages between 1897 and 1961.

The Cloncurry district was subject to pastoral settlement from the mid-1860s. Access to artesian water from the 1890s enabled the grazing of sheep and cattle to succeed despite severe drought and in what is essentially a semi-arid environment.

Mining also proved a significant activity in the district, although a less stable one than pastoralism. Gold was first discovered in the area in 1867, and from the late 1860s through the last three decades of the 19th century, gold was found and mined throughout the district, although as a series of short lived fields. In 1867 Ernest Henry, often referred to as "the father of Cloncurry", discovered copper in the area, not far from the present town of Cloncurry, although the boom era for copper mining was not reached until the early twentieth century.

The township of Cloncurry was established in the early 1870s to serve a remote and isolated area in the far north west of Queensland. It was officially declared a Country Post Office in 1871, and in 1872 a general store and a hotel were opened. Early transportation was by horse, bullock and camel teams, and later by Cobb & Co coaches. The Great Northern railway line to the east coast was not extended to Cloncurry until December 1908. Cloncurry prospered in the 1880s, when prices for pastoral produce remained buoyant and mining activity increased.

A police contingent of 4 men and an Inspector had been stationed in tents at Cloncurry from 1870, but it was not until 1880 that a permanent Clerk of Petty Sessions was appointed, and Cloncurry's first Police Magistrate was appointed in 1882. At that time there were still no permanent police quarters, and the lock-up was a slab hut with a bark roof. In 1883 the Department of Public Works called tenders for a timber building to serve as a Court house, police quarters and lockup. This was completed in 1885, and the first Court sat in March 1900. From 1907 this building was used for police purposes only and was demolished in 1965.

The administration of justice was brought to sparsely settled and isolated areas by means of small court houses combined with, or attached to, police stations and served by visiting magistrates. Cloncurry was designated a District Court Area in 1889, but almost a decade passed before a new court house was completed in July 1898 by Murray and Litster at a cost of £728. This court house was a rectangular, two-roomed, timber-framed structure with exposed studwork and a wide verandah to all four sides.

In the first two decades of the 20th century, Cloncurry prospered with the boom in copper prices and the corresponding increase in copper mining activity in the district. In 1906 Cloncurry became a Circuit Court centre. In 1907 the size of the court complex was more than doubled with the addition of a new court room and offices for the judge, barristers, court warden and jurors. The existing court was shifted slightly to adjoin the new section and became offices for the Clerk of Petty Sessions and for the government surveyor. This addition gave the building a new elevation to Sheaffe Street.

In 1914 further alterations were made to provide for officers from other government departments, including the land commissioner, mining registrar and inspector of machinery. A new hip-roofed wing was constructed at the southern end of the building which contained two rooms and extended the western verandah. A separate, 2 roomed structure was linked to the rear verandah by a covered way and accommodated drafting and records.

In 1953 a toilet block and strongroom was added and in 1961 the last major addition occurred when a four roomed wing was added to the 1914 section. This was built under the same roofline and continued the weatherboard cladding and existing window hood detail. The inspectorship of the police district was transferred from Cloncurry in 1963 as Mount Isa had developed to become the more important regional centre, however the court continues in use. In 1966 a new station, cells and quarters were constructed. Conservation work on the courthouse was undertaken in 1977 with state government funding. It continues to operate for its original purpose.

== Description ==
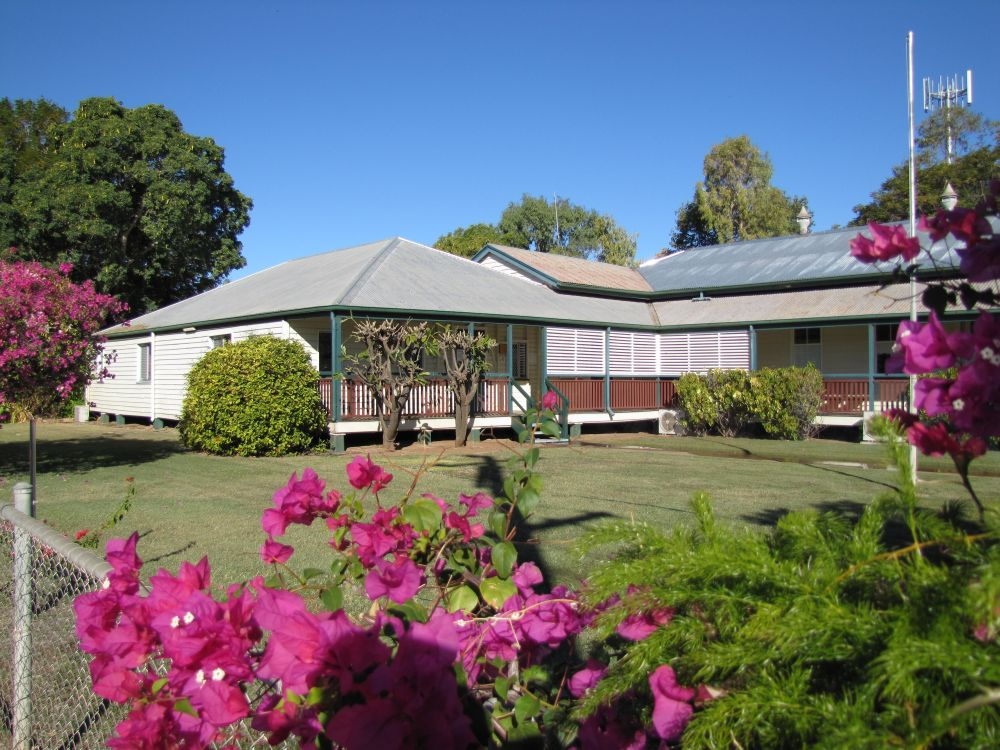
Side view, 2013

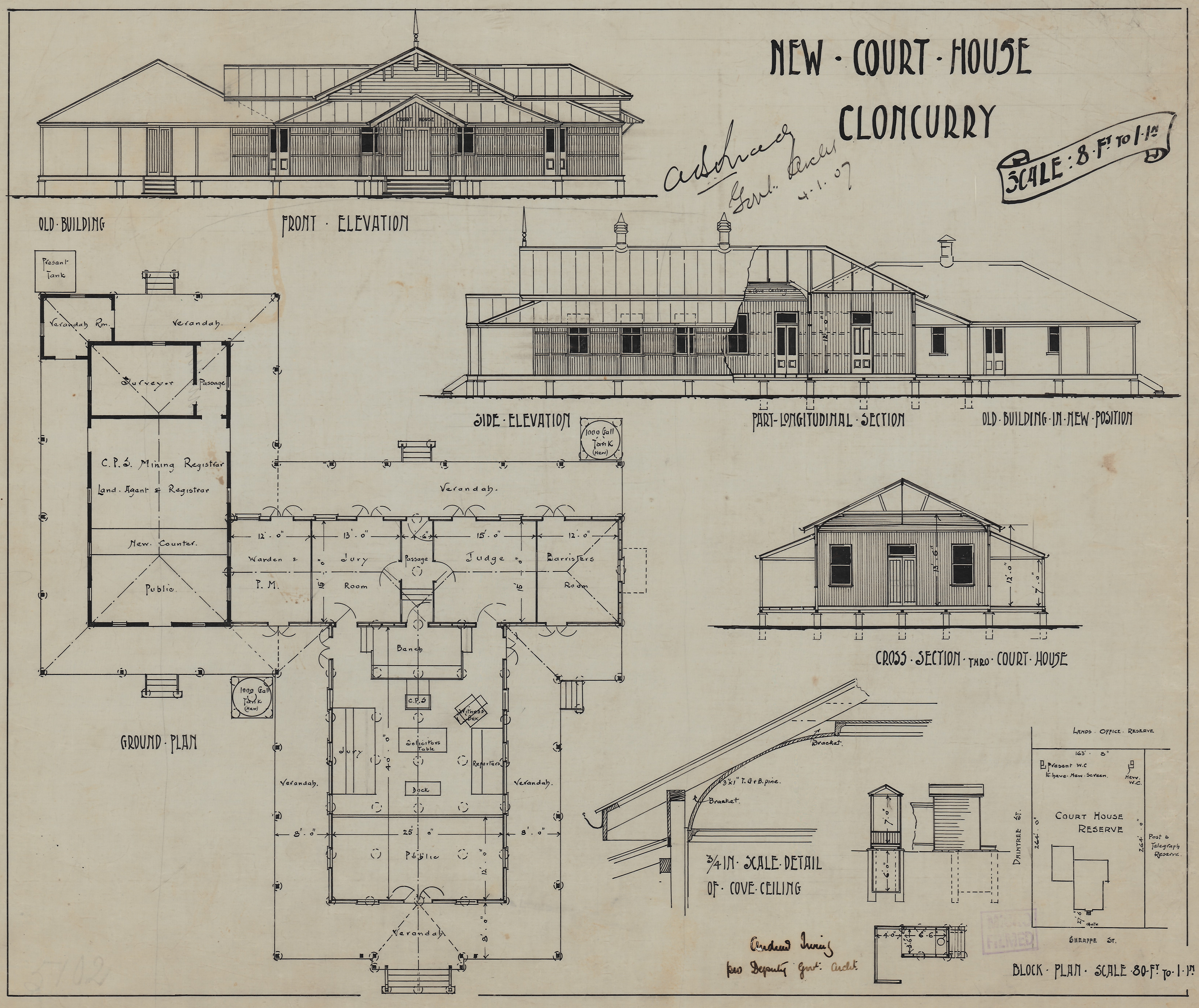
Architectural plans for the extended court house, Cloncurry, 1907

The 1897 section is a rectangular, two-roomed, timber-framed structure with exposed studwork, a hipped corrugated iron roof, and a 2.13 metres (7 ft 0 in) wide verandah to four sides, sections of which have been enclosed. Off the rear (eastern) verandah of the 1898 section is a hip-roofed 1953 block containing toilets and a strongroom. The walls, ceiling and floor of the strongroom are constructed of reinforced concrete; the remainder of the building is constructed of timber.

Attached to the southwest corner of the 1898 section is the 1907 addition. This comprises a T-shaped timber-framed building clad with weatherboard, with a 2.43 metres (8 ft 0 in) verandah around 3 sides of the stem of the T (which contains the courtroom), and around the rear offices, permitting the verandah of the new building to link with that of the 1897 building. The entrance addresses Sheaffe Street, and is articulated by a gable roof to the verandah at this point. The roof of this section is also of galvanised corrugated iron. The 1907 courtroom has a coved ceiling of tongue-and-groove pine, and walls of vertical boarding.

Off the southeast corner of the 1907 section, at the rear, is a long hip-roofed wing constructed in two stages: 2 rooms in 1914 and 4 in 1961. Both sections are timber-framed with weatherboard cladding and have the same window hood detail over exposed windows and doors. Both open onto a north-facing verandah, joined to the 1907 section.

There is a two-roomed timber pavilion linked to the rear (eastern) verandah of the 1907 section by what was originally a 5.50 metres (18.0 ft) long covered way, which is now completely joined to the eastern verandah. This section is timber-framed with horizontal weatherboard cladding and sunshades over exposed windows and doors. There are 4 toilets, added in later stages, to the south of the covered way.

Apart from the strongroom, all sections of this building are raised on low concrete stumps.

== Heritage listing ==
Cloncurry Court House was listed on the Queensland Heritage Register on 21 October 1992 having satisfied the following criteria.

The place is important in demonstrating the evolution or pattern of Queensland's history.

Cloncurry Court House is important in illustrating the development of Cloncurry and district, reflecting the importance of Cloncurry as a regional and administrative centre in the late 19th and early 20th century. This court house and the site on which it is located have been associated with the administration of justice in the region since the mid-1880s. The additions and adaptations also reflect the way in which provision has been made for increasing services to match the needs of the area with regard to mining and pastoralism.

The place is important in demonstrating the principal characteristics of a particular class of cultural places.

The Cloncurry Court house is a good example of a building serving a number of important governmental functions and extended over time while adhering to the original design principles. It provides a demonstration of building techniques within the traditional style between 1897 and 1961.

The place has a strong or special association with a particular community or cultural group for social, cultural or spiritual reasons.

The Cloncurry Court House has had a long connection with the people of Cloncurry and the surrounding district as the focus for a range of important government services.
