= Savannah Sanitoa =

Personal information
- Nationality: American Samoa
- Born: April 30, 1987 (age 39)

Sport
- Sport: Women's athletics
- Event: Sprint
Medal record
Athletics
Representing American Samoa
Oceania Youth Championships
Bronze medal – third place	2002 Christchurch	Long jump
Bronze medal – third place	2002 Christchurch	Hammer throw
- Updated on 16 April 2013

Savannah Sanitoa (born April 30, 1987) is a track and field athlete who competes internationally for American Samoa. She is most famous for competing at the 100 metres sprint at the 2009 IAAF World Championships in Berlin.

In 2006, Sanitoa represented American Samoa at the 11th IAAF World Junior Championships in Beijing. She competed at the 100 metres sprint and placed 8th in her heat without advancing to the second round. She ran the distance in a time of 14.56 seconds.

In 2009, she took part in the 12th IAAF World Championships. She had originally intended to compete in the shot put, but having not qualified, decided to take a wildcard spot in the 100 meters. She placed 6th in her heat without advancing to the second round. She ran the distance in a time of 14.23 seconds, 0.16 seconds outside of her personal best of 14.07.

== Personal bests ==
Date	Event	Venue	Performance
June 1, 2003	100 m	Apia, Western Samoa	14.07 s
January 1, 2003	Shot put	Apia, Western Samoa	8.55 m
June 1, 2003	Javelin throw	Apia, Western Samoa	32.41 m

== Achievements ==
Year	Competition	Venue	Position	Event	Notes
Representing American Samoa
2002	Oceania Youth Championships	Christchurch, New Zealand	3rd	Long jump	4.38 m w (wind: 6.2 m/s)
2002	Oceania Youth Championships	Christchurch, New Zealand	3rd	Hammer throw	21.44 m
2006	World Junior Championships	Beijing, China	62nd (h)	100m	14.56 s (wind: +0.8 m/s)
