= Robert Crowther =

Australian long jumper

Personal information
- Nickname: Joug
- Nationality: Australia
- Born: 2 August 1987 (age 38) Cloncurry, Queensland

Sport
- Sport: Athletics
Medal record
Men's athletics
Representing Australia
Oceania Youth Championships
Gold medal – first place	2004 Townsville	High jump
Gold medal – first place	2004 Townsville	Long jump
Gold medal – first place	2004 Townsville	Triple jump
- Updated on 17 April 2013

Robert Crowther (born 2 August 1987 in Cloncurry) is an Australian long jumper. His personal best is 8.12 metres, achieved at the IAAF Diamond League in 2011 in Stockholm. Robert Crowther identifies as both Aboriginal and Torres Strait Islander.

== Achievements ==
Year	Competition	Venue	Position	Event	Notes
Representing Australia
2004	Oceania Youth Championships	Townsville, Australia	1st	High jump	1.95 m
2004	Oceania Youth Championships	Townsville, Australia	1st	Long jump	6.81 m w (wind: +2.4 m/s)
2004	Oceania Youth Championships	Townsville, Australia	1st	Triple jump	14.92 m (wind: +1.8 m/s)
2006	World Junior Championships	Beijing, China	1st	Long jump	8.00 m (wind: +0.3 m/s) PB
2007	Universiade	Bangkok, Thailand	1st	Long jump	8.02 PB
2008	Australian Athletics Championships	Brisbane, Australia	1st	Long Jump	7.96m (+1.1 Wind)
2010	Australian Athletics Championships	Perth, Australia	3rd	Long Jump	7.91m
2011	Australian Athletics Championships	Melbourne, Australia	2nd	Long jump	8.05 PB (+2.5 Wind)
