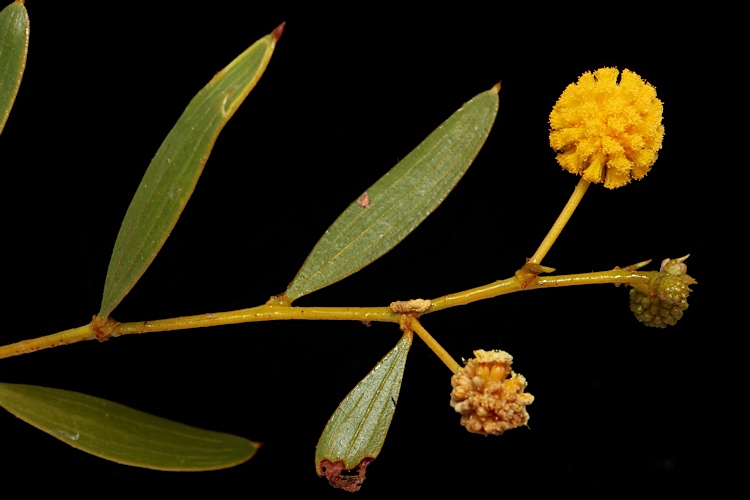

Scientific classification
- Kingdom: Plantae
- Clade: Embryophytes
- Clade: Tracheophytes
- Clade: Spermatophytes
- Clade: Angiosperms
- Clade: Eudicots
- Clade: Rosids
- Order: Fabales
- Family: Fabaceae
- Subfamily: Caesalpinioideae
- Clade: Mimosoid clade
- Genus: Acacia
- Species: A. phlebocarpa

Binomial name
- Acacia phlebocarpa F.Muell.
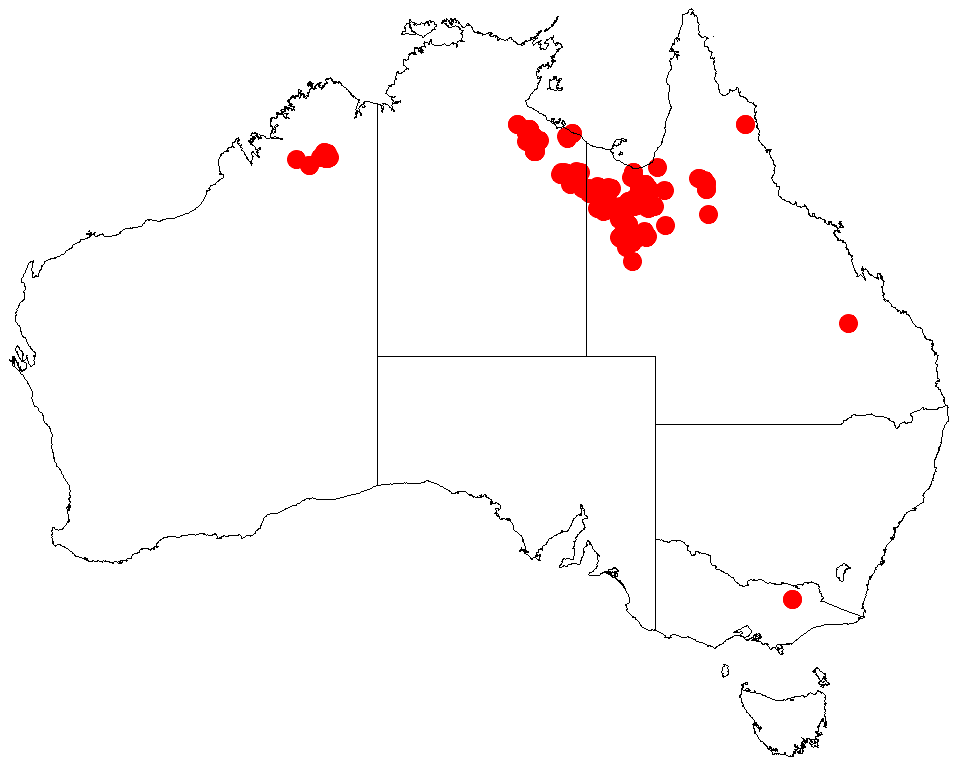
- Occurrence data from AVH

= Acacia phlebocarpa =

Species of legume

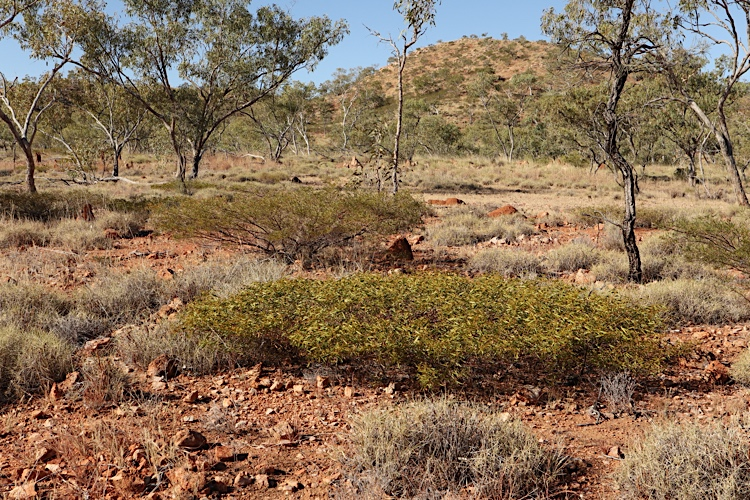
Habit between Mount Isa and Cloncurry

Acacia phlebocarpa, also known as tabletop wattle, is a shrub of the genus Acacia and the subgenus Plurinerves and is native to northern Australia.

== Description ==
The spreading viscid shrub typically grows to a height of 0.4 to 1.2 metres (1 to 4 ft). The shrub has a flattened crown. It has glabrous or with lines of appressed hairs, terete and resinous branchlets with persistent stipules that are 1 to 1.5 mm (0.039 to 0.059 in) in length. Like most species of Acacia it has phyllodes rather than true leaves. The straight and narrowly elliptic to oblong-elliptic shaped phyllodes with a length of 2 to 5.5 cm (0.79 to 2.17 in) and a width of 4 to 12 mm (0.16 to 0.47 in). The semi-pungent phyllodes are thinly-coriaceous and have three distant raised main nerves with many parallel secondary nerves. It blooms from April to June and produces yellow flowers. The simple inflorescences occur singly in the axils. The spherical flower-heads globular have a diameter of 7 to 8 mm (0.28 to 0.31 in) and contain 45 to 60 golden coloured flowers. The linear seed pods that form after flowering are strongly curved or have a single coil. The pods have a length of up to 6 cm (2.4 in) and a width of 4 to 6 mm (0.16 to 0.24 in) and contain broadly elliptic to nearly circular seeds. The glossy black seeds have a length of 3.8 to 4.3 mm (0.15 to 0.17 in).

== Distribution and habitat ==
an area in the Kimberley region of Western Australia, and north western Queensland and the Northern Territory. It grows on stony and lateritic soils and on sandstone on plains and rocky ridges. The soils are often shallow and are stony and sandy and are found in open woodland communities or with species of Triodia.

== See also ==
- List of Acacia species
