= Terefe Ejigu =

Ethiopian–New Zealand athlete

Personal information
- Nationality: New Zealand
- Born: Terefe Tsegaye Ejigu; 14 October 1988 (age 37) Arsi Negele, Ethiopia
- Height: 5 ft 5 in (1.65 m)
- Weight: 130 lb (59 kg)

Sport
- Country: New Zealand
- University team: Eastern Michigan Eagles
Medal record
Athletics
Representing New Zealand
Oceania Youth Championships
Gold medal – first place	2004 Townsville	1500 m
Gold medal – first place	2004 Townsville	3000 m

Terefe Ejigu (born 14 October 1988) is an Ethiopian-born New Zealand long distance runner.

== Early life ==
He was born as Terefe Tsegaye Ejigu in Ethiopia. In 2001 at the age of 13 he fled violence in Ethiopia with his siblings. He settled in Wellington, New Zealand with his family where he enrolled at Wellington College. At the time, he spoke no English. While at the college, he began training as a runner, setting a new national junior record for the 5000 m. He attended Victoria University of Wellington to earn a degree in development studies. In 2009, he was awarded a $100,000 scholarship from Eastern Michigan University in the United States. In 2012 he won first team ALL-MAC honors for his academic achievement at the university. In 2012, Ejigu won the 5000 m at the Mid-American Conference Indoor Track and Field Championships. He also won the mile race and finished second in the 3000 m. Filmmaker Anna Cottrell documented Ejigu's life story in the documentary Running For His Life.

== Achievements ==
Year	Competition	Venue	Position	Event	Notes
Representing New Zealand
2004	Oceania Youth Championships	Townsville, Australia	1st	1500 m	4:00.73
2004	Oceania Youth Championships	Townsville, Australia	1st	3000 m	8:41.04
