= Cloncurry Post Office =

Post office in Queensland, Australia

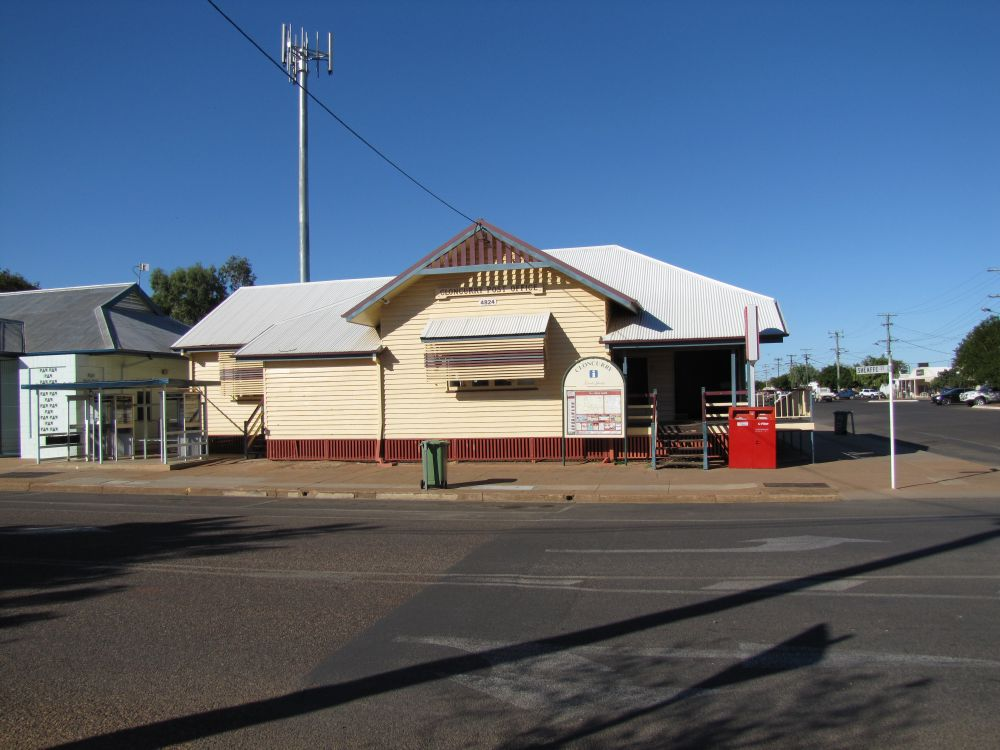
- Cloncurry Post Office, 2013

- Location within Queensland Location within Australia
- 20.7054°S 140.5058°E
- Location: 47 Scarr Street, Cloncurry, Shire of Cloncurry, Queensland, Australia

History
- Design period: 1900–1914 (early 20th century)
- Built: 1906

Site notes
- Architect: Queensland Works Department

Queensland Heritage Register
- Official name: Cloncurry Post Office
- Type: state heritage (built)
- Designated: 27 May 2005
- Reference no.: 600416
- Significant period: 1906 (fabric); 1880s–ongoing (historical, social)

Cloncurry Post Office is a heritage-listed post office at 47 Scarr Street, Cloncurry, Shire of Cloncurry, Queensland, Australia. It was designed by Queensland Works Department and built in 1906. It was added to the Queensland Heritage Register on 27 May 2005.

== History ==
The Cloncurry Post Office is a single storey timber building, which was built in 1906 and superseded an 1883 post office on site.

Land in the Cloncurry district was taken up by pastoralists from the mid-1860s. Access to artesian water from the 1890s enabled the grazing of sheep and cattle to flourish in what is essentially a semi-arid environment and pastoralism has been the major industry in this area.

Mining also proved a significant activity in the district, although a less stable one than pastoralism. Gold was first discovered in the area in 1867, and from the late 1860s through the last three decades of the 19th century, gold was found and mined throughout the district, although as a series of short lived fields. In 1867 Ernest Henry, often referred to as "the father of Cloncurry", discovered copper in the area, not far from the present town of Cloncurry, although the boom era for copper mining was not reached until the early twentieth century. The township of Cloncurry was established in the early 1870s to serve a remote and isolated area in the far north west of Queensland. It was officially designated a Country Post Office in 1871 and in June that year the first postmaster was appointed, operating from temporary accommodation. In 1872 a general store and a hotel were opened, forming the nucleus for a service township. Early transportation was by horse, bullock and camel teams. Mail contractors using pack horses operated mail runs along routes radiating from Cloncurry as the demand for postal services increased in subsequent years. Cloncurry prospered in the 1880s, when prices for pastoral produce remained buoyant and mining activity increased. The first Cobb & Co coach arrived in Cloncurry in 1884, and for almost a quarter of a century provided the district with both a passenger and a mail service in the absence of a railway. The Great Northern railway reached Cloncurry in 1908.

The first purpose-designed Cloncurry Post Office was a small timber building comprising an office and post master's quarters, erected in 1883. In that year Cloncurry Post Office was made a Money Order Office and an official electric telegraph station. The first telegraph lines connected Cloncurry with Aramac and Boulia. In 1888 a line was established between Cloncurry and Normanton, and in 1890 Cloncurry was linked to Camooweal and Urandangi. Cloncurry had police stationed in the town from 1870 and was designated a District Court Area in 1889. The first Court sat in 1900 and in 1906 became a designated District Court. This important function could not have been carried out without the means of rapid communication provided by the post and telegraph service.

In the first two decades of the 20th century, Cloncurry prospered with the boom in copper prices and the corresponding surge in copper mining activity in the district. In 1906 a new post office was designed for Cloncurry and erected at a cost of £1375/15/-. It was a large office building for post and telegraph functions, connected by a covered way to a separate postmaster's quarters. These were in the old post office, which was turned to face Scarr Street and moved behind the new building.

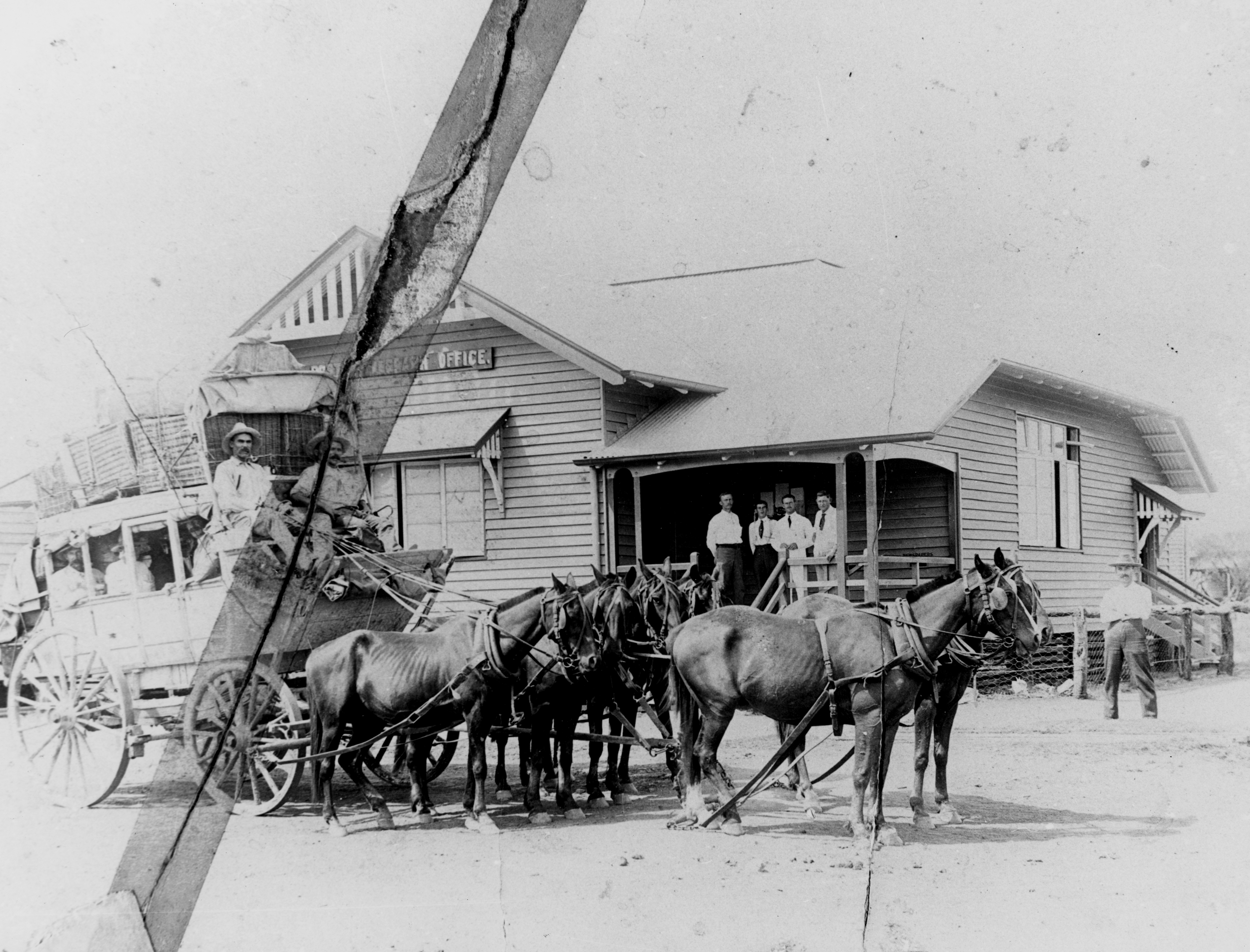
Stagecoach outside the Cloncurry Post Office, circa 1910

The new post office was a standard T17 type of timber post office, with a twin porch and gable, designed by the Queensland Works Department. These were erected throughout Queensland in the period 1906–1921, although post and telegraph services became an Australian Government responsibility after Federation. These buildings achieved a high standard of design and construction and architecturally, the T17 is the most significant of 20th century timber post office types for the quality of construction and detail, for its resolution of climatic considerations, and for the visual appeal of its form. Many of the type have, however, been demolished or are no longer functional post offices. This post office has been extended at the side, the extension covering the area previously occupied by the old post office.

A new telephone exchange was opened at Cloncurry in 1912 and in the 1920s the establishment of QANTAS in 1922 and the Flying Doctor Service in 1929 at Cloncurry made the town an epicentre of the north-west. By the 1950s Cloncurry was a centre for mail, telephone and telegraph services for huge area from Normanton to Boulia and west to Camooweal. A brick extension to the post office was constructed in 1954 to house these services as well as the control station for north west Queensland's Auxiliary Radio network. This base was moved to Mount Isa in 1964 as that centre grew in importance.

The Cloncurry Post Office continues to operate as such.

== Description ==
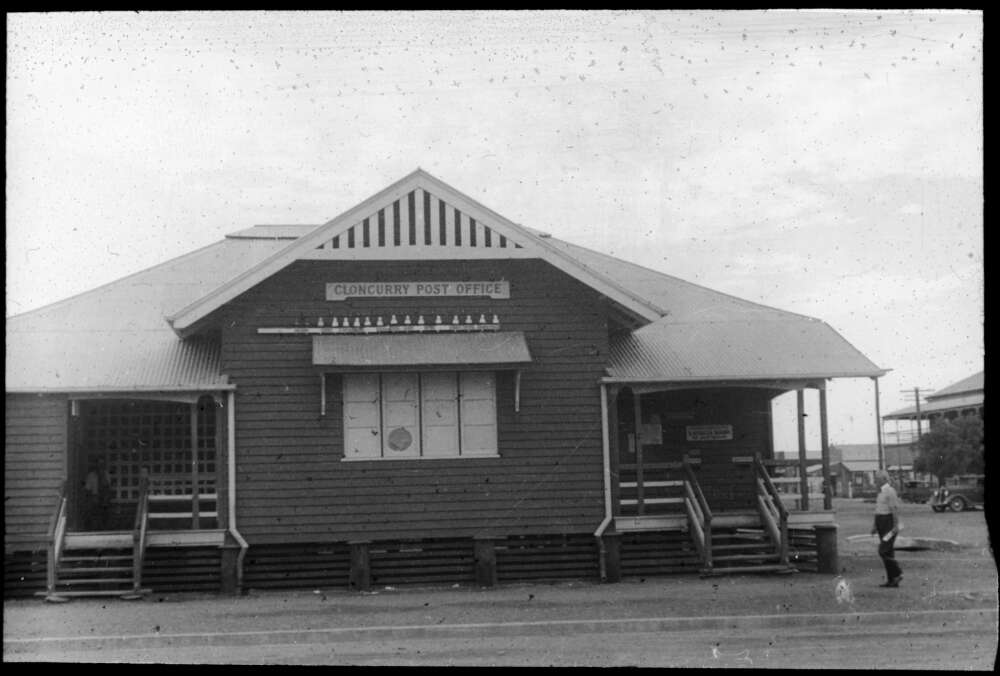
Cloncurry Post Office, 1935

The post office is a single storey timber building set on low stumps and located prominently on the corner of Scarr and Sheaffe Streets. The original section is symmetrical in form with a projecting gable over the main public area between twin porches, the roof for which was an extension of the main roof. The porches are reached by low sets of timber steps and have timber balustrading. The roof is hipped and clad in clad in corrugated iron. A later extension with a gable roof is connected to this building and continues the materials and detail of the original.

== Heritage listing ==
Cloncurry Post Office was listed on the Queensland Heritage Register on 27 May 2005 having satisfied the following criteria.

The place is important in demonstrating the evolution or pattern of Queensland's history.

Cloncurry Post Office illustrates the development of Cloncurry and district in the early 20th century and has been the focus of services which played an important part in allowing this geographically isolated town to become a major regional centre.

The place is important in demonstrating the principal characteristics of a particular class of cultural places.

It is important in illustrating the principal characteristics of a timber twin porch and gable post office building of the period 1906–1921, designed by the Queensland Works Department, and has aesthetic value which contributes significantly to the Cloncurry townscape.

The place is important because of its aesthetic significance.

It is important in illustrating the principal characteristics of a timber twin porch and gable post office building of the period 1906–1921, designed by the Queensland Works Department, and has aesthetic value which contributes significantly to the Cloncurry townscape.

The place has a strong or special association with a particular community or cultural group for social, cultural or spiritual reasons.

The Cloncurry Post Office has had a long connection with the people of Cloncurry and the surrounding district as a provider of vital communication services which have been conducted from this site since 1883.
