= 2002 Oceania Youth Athletics Championships =

VI Oceania Youth Athletics Championships
- Dates: December 12–14
- Host city: Christchurch, New Zealand
- Venue: Queen Elizabeth II Park
- Level: Youth
- Events: 34 (17 boys, 17 girls)
- Participation: 96 (55 boys, 41 girls) athletes from 15 nations

The 2002 Oceania Youth Athletics Championships were held at the Queen Elizabeth II Park in Christchurch, New Zealand, between December 12–14, 2002. They were held together with the 2002 Oceania Open Championships. A total of 34 events were contested, 17 by boys and 17 by girls.

== Medal summary ==
Medal winners can be found on the Athletics Weekly webpage. Complete results can be found on the webpages of World Junior Athletics History, and of the Cool Running New Zealand newsgroup.

=== Boys under 18 (Youth) ===
Event	Gold		Silver		Bronze	
100 metres (wind: 3.8m/s)	Matawesi Telawa (FIJ)	11.53 w	Brett Robinson (AUS)	11.55 w	Jone Biutilodoni (FIJ)	11.58 w
200 metres (wind: 1.9m/s)	Cory Innes (NZL)	22.31	Todd Mansfield (NZL)	22.51	Brett Robinson (AUS)	22.64
400 metres	Cameron Hewitt (AUS)	49.69	Wilson Malana (PNG)	51.73	Matthew Wills (AUS)	52.03
800 metres	Cameron Hewitt (AUS)	1:56.55	Setefano Mika (SAM)	1:57.56	Ben McHale (NZL)	1:59.01
1500 metres	Garit Read (NZL)	4:16.49	Ben McHale (NZL)	4:17.20	Setefano Mika (SAM)	4:28.83
3000 metres	Garit Read (NZL)	8:49.56	Guillaume Pérez (NCL)	9:32.92	Tony Gordon (AUS)	9:50.52
110 metres hurdles (wind: -4.8m/s)	Yona Pakoro (NCL)	15.56	Dwain Weyers (AUS)	15.74	Damien Ajapunhya (NCL)	16.04
400 metres hurdles	Damien Ajapunhya (NCL)	57.23	Aaifou Faumausili (SAM)	58.44	(French Polynesia) /Tarepa Bourgery (TAH)	58.71
High jump	Kumi 'Uhila (TGA)	1.85	James Murphy (AUS)	1.85	Paul Schilling (AUS)	1.85
Pole vault	Johan Smallberger (NZL)	4.05				
Long jump	Tom Davie (NZL)	7.13 w (wind: 3.0m/s)	(French Polynesia) /Christian Afou (TAH)	6.90 w (wind: 5.3m/s)	Drew Campbell (AUS)	6.83 w (wind: 4.7m/s)
Triple jump	Dwain Weyers (AUS)	14.03 (wind: -0.4m/s)	Tom Davie (NZL)	13.87 (wind: +0.7m/s)	(French Polynesia) /Christian Afou (TAH)	13.55 w (wind: 2.3m/s)
Shot put	Stephen Lasei (SAM)	14.26	Ben Barnes (AUS)	14.24	Jeffrey Bowen (TGA)	13.55
Discus throw	Stephen Lasei (SAM)	40.73	Ben Barnes (AUS)	39.85	Jeffrey Bowen (TGA)	33.97
Hammer throw	Dwain Weyers (AUS)	48.59	Ben Barnes (AUS)	45.98	Jeffrey Bowen (TGA)	28.84
Javelin throw	Jolame Bera (FIJ)	66.96	Johan Smallberger (NZL)	52.21	Adam Montague (AUS)	48.11
800 metres Medley relay (100m x 100m x 200m x 400m)	Australia	1:36.75	New Zealand; Tom Davie; Cory Innes; Todd Mansfield; Ben McHale	1:41.00		

=== Girls under 18 (Youth) ===
Event	Gold		Silver		Bronze	
100 metres (wind: 3.4m/s)	Aimee Lynch (NZL)	12.88 w	Talava Tavui (SAM)	12.98 w	Elianna Suluvale (AUS)	13.23 w
200 metres (wind: 4.0m/s)	Aimee Lynch (NZL)	26.14 w	Talava Tavui (SAM)	26.41 w	Elianna Suluvale (AUS)	26.63 w
400 metres	Rachel Pederson (AUS)	58.34	Nicole Burry (AUS)	60.65	Gilda Ihmanang (NCL)	63.04
800 metres	Riana Dinsmore (AUS)	2:17.56	Rachel Pederson (AUS)	2:18.83	Clare Goodwin (NZL)	2:19.32
1500 metres	Julia Scoones (NZL)	4:43.68	Riana Dinsmore (AUS)	4:51.63	Angela Hallam (AUS)	5:00.56
3000 metres	Clare Goodwin (NZL)	10:45.17	Angela Hallam (AUS)	11:04.33	Banrenga Baikia (KIR)	13:17.38
100 metres hurdles (wind: -3.7m/s)	Rachael Cullen (AUS)	17.39	Nicole Palamo (SAM)	19.91		
400 metres hurdles	Nicole Burry (AUS)	65.98	Gilda Ihmanang (NCL)	68.15	Rachel Phillips (AUS)	69.95
High jump	Susie Bray (PNG)	1.51	Jedda Fletcher (NFK)	1.50	Kimai Dan Murdoch (KIR)	1.45
Pole vault	Amber Grogan (NZL)	3.30	Marion Becker (NCL)	2.80	(French Polynesia) /Lucie Tepea (TAH)	2.80
Long jump	Elianna Suluvale (AUS)	5.51 w (wind: 5.6m/s)	Margaret Teiti (COK)	4.85 w (wind: 5.7m/s)	Savannah Sanitoa (ASA)	4.38 w (wind: 6.2m/s)
Triple jump	Nicole Burry (AUS)	10.89 (wind: -0.5m/s)	Nicole Palamo (SAM)	10.09 w (wind: 5.9m/s)	Jedda Fletcher (NFK)	9.85 (wind: 1.3m/s)
Shot put	Leana Bishop (AUS)	12.73	Tracey Lambrechts (NZL)	11.40	Natalie Stuart (AUS)	11.22
Discus throw	Leana Bishop (AUS)	44.13	Danielle Volling-Geoghegan (AUS)	37.20	Terry Tupuna (COK)	34.15
Hammer throw	Kirstin Faint (AUS)	33.85	Helen Samuelu (SAM)	22.65	Savannah Sanitoa (ASA)	21.44
Javelin throw	(French Polynesia) /Lucie Tepea (TAH)	33.78	Lauren Cave (AUS)	33.04	Helen Samuelu (SAM)	31.23
800 metres Medley relay (100m x 100m x 200m x 400m)	Australia	1:54.98	New Caledonia; Marion Becker; Laurine Vakoume; Françoise Hnepeune; Gilda Ihmanang	2:04.34		

== Medal table (unofficial) ==
* Host nation (New Zealand)

Rank	Nation	Gold	Silver	Bronze	Total
1	Australia (AUS)	15	12	11	38
2	New Zealand (NZL)*	10	6	2	18
3	Samoa (SAM)	2	7	2	11
4	New Caledonia (NCL)	2	4	2	8
5	Fiji (FIJ)	2	0	1	3
6	French Polynesia (TAH)	1	1	3	5
7	Papua New Guinea (PNG)	1	1	0	2
8	Tonga (TON)	1	0	3	4
9	Cook Islands (COK)	0	1	1	2
9	Norfolk Island (NFK)	0	1	1	2
11	American Samoa (ASA)	0	0	2	2
11	Kiribati (KIR)	0	0	2	2
Totals (12 entries)		34	33	30	97

== Participation (unofficial) ==
An unofficial count yields the number of about 96 athletes from 15 countries:

- American Samoa (4)
- Australia (24)
- Cook Islands (8)
- Fiji (3)
- Kiribati (5)
- Nauru (6)
- New Caledonia (10)
- New Zealand (11)
- Norfolk Island (2)
- Papua New Guinea (3)
- Samoa (6)
- Solomon Islands (4)
- (French Polynesia) /Tahiti (4)
- Tonga (3)
- Vanuatu (3)
