= Cloncurry Solar Farm =

Proposed solar farm in Queensland, Australia

- Country: Australia
- Location: Cloncurry, Queensland
- Coordinates: 20°42′15″S 140°30′20″E
- Status: Under construction
- Construction began: July 2012
- Commission date: October 2012
- Construction cost: $6,760,000
- Owner: Queensland Government
- Operator: Ingenero

Solar farm
- Type: Flat-panel PV

Power generation
- Units operational: 7,600
- Nameplate capacity: 2 MW
- Annual net output: 3.7 GWh

External links
- Website: Cloncurry Solar Farm

A solar thermal power station was to be built in Cloncurry, in north-west Queensland. The solar thermal power station was planned to have a nameplate capacity of 10 MW and deliver about 30 gigawatt-hours of electricity a year, enough to power the whole town.

It was reported in November 2010 that the project was scrapped because of light pollution concerns.

However, as of 2 December 2011 Ingenero Pty Ltd have been named preferred developer to install a 2 MW photovoltaic power system, installation is expected to commence in July 2012.

On 24 May 2012 the recently elected Newman government announced the withdrawal of state funds for the project. In a statement, the Minister for Energy Mark McArdle described the reason for the scrapping as 'saving the taxpayer's money'.

== Project ==
The total cost of the project was to have been A$31 million, including a A$7 million gift from the government. The plant was supposed to be running by early 2010.

On 16 November 2010, Lloyd Energy Systems advised the government to not proceed further. The cancellation of the project was due to reflective glare issues, which had raised concerns about operating in an urban environment and potential impacts on community health. The government decided to invest the remaining $5.7 million from the project towards a photovoltaic solar farm for the area.

== Heat storage ==
The design is a common solar power tower design. An array of motorised heliostat mirrors reflects sunlight to the summit of a tower. The summit houses a receiver, which is heated by the concentrated sunlight. A total of 54 towers of 18 m (59 ft) high will be constructed.

An important advantage of solar thermal energy is the possibility of storing heat for later use. In this way, the plant can also produce electricity at night or on overcast days. A common method is the storage of molten nitrate salt in large tanks; this is the technology used in Solar Tres Power Tower.

The Cloncurry plant uses the new technology of heat storage in blocks of purified graphite. The blocks are placed on top of the tower. The concentrated light on the receivers of the towers is directly transported to these blocks. The heat for electricity production is drawn from the blocks (i.e. there is no direct heat transport from the receiver).

== See also ==
- List of solar thermal power stations
