= 1993 Oceania Youth Athletics Championships =

I Oceania Youth Athletics Championships
- Dates: March 15–16
- Host city: Canberra, Australia
- Level: Youth
- Events: 29 (15 boys, 14 girls)
- Participation: 96 (61 boys, 35 girls) athletes from 13 nations

The 1993 Oceania Youth Athletics Championships were held in Canberra, Australia, between March 15–16, 1993. The host country Australia did not send athletes. A total of 29 events were contested, 15 by boys and 14 by girls.

== Medal summary ==
Complete results can be found on the Athletics Weekly, and on the World Junior Athletics History webpages.

=== Boys under 18 (Youth) ===
Event	Gold		Silver		Bronze	
100 metres (wind: -0.4 m/s)	Dean Wise (NZL)	11.10	Galvin Ora (SOL)	11.36	Tomasi Rasoki (FIJ)	11.43
200 metres (wind: -0.9 m/s)	Dean Wise (NZL)	22.47	Galvin Ora (SOL)	22.73	Tomasi Rasoki (FIJ)	22.93
400 metres	P. Young (NZL)	48.87	Evan Vatamana (SOL)	51.67	Maika Soqoidaveta (FIJ)	52.90
800 metres	P. Young (NZL)	1:54.72	Evan Vatamana (SOL)	2:04.35	Bill Davu (PNG)	2:04.99
1500 metres	Saimoni Kiniwa (FIJ)	4:26.47	Liken Ireng (PNG)	4:28.64	Ben Whitaker (GUM)	4:28.66
3000 metres	Saimoni Kiniwa (FIJ)	10:05.98	Rereao Pakari (COK)	10:28.17	Ben Whitaker (GUM)	10:31.96
100 metres hurdles	Pauli Tu'imoala (TGA)	17.02	Aufata Faleata (SAM)	17.70	Darryl Anesi (SAM)	18.11
400 metres hurdles	(French Polynesia) /Teiki Rodiere (TAH)	1:03.11				
High jump	John Elisha (PNG)	1.75	Gideon Omokirio (SOL)	1.75	Manare Ma'ake (TGA)	1.75
Long jump	Dean Wise (NZL)	6.79	Coleridge Sua (SOL)	6.28	Galvin Ora (SOL)	6.14
Triple jump	Akilisi Tu'i (TGA)	13.11	Darryl Anesi (SAM)	13.11	David Wilson (GUM)	11.10
Shot put	Aufata Faleata (SAM)	13.85	Ricky Canon (NRU)	10.15	Junior Harry (COK)	9.88
Discus throw	Aufata Faleata (SAM)	40.90	Charles Winchester (COK)	32.10	Pauli Tu'imoala (TGA)	27.82
Javelin throw	Junior Harry (COK)	51.02	Fine Olsson (NRU)	47.78	(French Polynesia) /Honoré Perry (TAH)	41.52
800 metres Medley Relay (100m x 100m x 200m x 400m)	Fiji	1:35.83	Solomon Islands	1:36.48	Samoa	1:40.41

=== Girls under 18 (Youth) ===
Event	Gold		Silver		Bronze	
100 metres (wind: 1.3 m/s)	Jane Arnott (NZL)	12.39	Rosi Tamani (FIJ)	12.53	Maria Maunder (NZL)	12.60
200 metres (wind: 0.6 m/s)	Jane Arnott (NZL)	24.72	Rosi Tamani (FIJ)	25.71	Masilina Rakai (FIJ)	26.11
400 metres	Makelesi Bulikiobo (FIJ)	60.94	Alle Gagole (PNG)	63.43	Mereseini Kelea (FIJ)	63.65
800 metres	(French Polynesia) /Vanessa Guyot-Sionnest (TAH)	2:19.15	Melina Hamilton (NZL)	2:21.05	Ilisapeci Ligalau (FIJ)	2:21.15
1500 metres	Kate Inwood (NZL)	4:53.30	Ilisapeci Ligalau (FIJ)	5:00.84	Joy Nunua (SOL)	5:01.56
3000 metres	Kate Inwood (NZL)	10:08.59	Ekari Raika (FIJ)	11:11.82	Joy Nunua (SOL)	12:01.31
300 metres hurdles	(French Polynesia) /Anne Dantin (TAH)	48.6				
High jump	Melina Hamilton (NZL)	1.55	Ana Tong (FIJ)	1.45	(French Polynesia) /Anne Dantin (TAH)	1.45
Long jump	Rosi Tamani (FIJ)	5.32	Maria Maunder (NZL)	5.25	Marica Likulawedua (FIJ)	5.23
Triple jump	Maria Maunder (NZL)	11.19				
Shot put	Fleurette Bartley (NZL)	10.29	Mareta Nayacalevu (FIJ)	10.06	Aliti O'Keeffe (PNG)	8.28
Discus throw	Fleurette Bartley (NZL)	41.42	Mareta Nayacalevu (FIJ)	29.46	(French Polynesia) /Mytsuro Kato (TAH)	28.62
Javelin throw	(French Polynesia) /Monia Pahi (TAH)	41.68	Melina Hamilton (NZL)	37.34	(French Polynesia) /Mytsuro Kato (TAH)	34.14
800 metres Medley Relay (100m x 100m x 200m x 400m)	Fiji	1:50.81	Papua New Guinea	1:59.71	Nauru	2:10.79

== Medal table (unofficial) ==
Rank	Nation	Gold	Silver	Bronze	Total
1	New Zealand (NZL)	13	3	1	17
2	Fiji (FIJ)	6	7	7	20
3	French Polynesia (TAH)	4	0	4	8
4	Samoa (SAM)	2	2	2	6
5	Tonga (TON)	2	0	2	4
6	Papua New Guinea (PNG)	1	3	2	6
7	Cook Islands (COK)	1	2	1	4
8	Solomon Islands (SOL)	0	7	3	10
9	Nauru (NRU)	0	2	1	3
10	Guam (GUM)	0	0	3	3
Totals (10 entries)		29	26	26	81

== Participation (unofficial) ==
An unofficial count yields the number of about 96 athletes from 13 countries. There were no athletes from host country Australia.

- American Samoa (8)
- Cook Islands (7)
- Fiji (16)
- Guam (6)
- Marshall Islands (5)
- Nauru (10)
- New Zealand (7)
- Northern Mariana Islands (2)
- Papua New Guinea (8)
- Samoa (6)
- Solomon Islands (7)
- (French Polynesia) /Tahiti (7)
- Tonga (7)
