= 2017 Oceania U18 Athletics Championships =

XIV Oceania U18 Athletics Championships
- Dates: 28 June–1 July
- Host city: Suva, Fiji,
- Venue: ANZ Stadium
- Level: Youth

The 2017 Oceania U18 Athletics Championships were held at the ANZ Stadium in Suva, Fiji, between June 28 and July 1, 2017. They were held together with the 2017 Oceania Senior Championships and the 2017 Oceania U20 Athletics Championships.

== Medal summary ==
Complete results can be found on the Oceania Athletics Association webpage.
