= 2004 Oceania Youth Athletics Championships =

VII Oceania Youth Athletics Championships
- Dates: December 16–18
- Host city: Townsville, Queensland, Australia
- Venue: Townsville Sports Reserve
- Level: Youth
- Events: 35 (18 boys, 17 girls)
- Participation: 135 (70 boys, 65 girls) athletes from 19 nations

The 2004 Oceania Youth Athletics Championships were held at the Townsville Sports Reserve in Townsville, Australia, between December 16–18, 2004. They were held together with the 2004 Oceania Open Championships. A total of 35 events were contested, 18 by boys and 17 by girls.

== Medal summary ==
Medal winners can be found on the Athletics Weekly website. Complete results can be found on webpages of the World Junior Athletics History, and of the Ligue de Nouvelle Calédonie Athlétisme (LNCA).

=== Boys under 18 (Youth) ===
Event	Gold		Silver		Bronze	
100 metres (wind: 2.5m/s)	Lars Hansen (AUS)	11.14 w	Craig Sneddon (NZL)	11.16 w	Andrew Doonar (PNG)	11.22 w
200 metres (wind: 0.5m/s)	Craig Sneddon (NZL)	22.36	Andrew Doonar (PNG)	22.52	Lars Hansen (AUS)	22.65
400 metres	Jackson Mallory (AUS)	50.15	Sammy Sasama (PNG)	52.52	Michael Currie (AUS)	52.64
800 metres	Michael Christmas (NZL)	1:57.57	Jackson Mallory (AUS)	2:00.93	Jay Rex Hagaria (SOL)	2:01.63
1500 metres	Terefe Ejigu (NZL)	4:00.73	Michael Christmas (NZL)	4:08.07	Om Halliday (AUS)	4:14.56
3000 metres	Terefe Ejigu (NZL)	8:41.04	Om Halliday (AUS)	9:25.34	Andrew Kittle (AUS)	9:35.35
110 metres hurdles (wind: 2.7m/s)	Viliami Hakalo (TGA)	14.52 w	Andrew Yong (AUS)	14.72 w	Anthony McLellan (NZL)	15.05 w
400 metres hurdles	Anthony McLellan (NZL)	55.27	Viliami Hakalo (TGA)	56.12	Inoke Finau (TGA)	58.43
High jump	Robert Crowther (AUS)	1.95	David Thompson (NZL)	1.95	Stellio Tauraa (PYF)	1.85
Pole vault	Brendan Albrey (NZL)	3.20	Carl Dorman (AUS)	2.60		
Long jump	Robert Crowther (AUS)	6.81 w (wind: 2.4m/s)	David Thompson (NZL)	6.76 w (wind: 2.4m/s)	Kainrick Ozoux (NCL)	6.55 (wind: 1.5m/s)
Triple jump	Robert Crowther (AUS)	14.92 (wind: 1.8m/s)	Kainrick Ozoux (NCL)	14.33 w (wind: 2.6m/s)	Jacques Xeniatre (NCL)	14.27 (wind: 1.8m/s)
Shot put	Tumatai Dauphin (PYF)	17.63	Stephen Lasei (SAM)	17.04	Bart Atherinos (AUS)	15.08
Discus throw	Stephen Lasei (SAM)	50.90	Bart Atherinos (AUS)	50.53	Erwan Cassier (NCL)	50.35
Hammer throw	Erwan Cassier (NCL)	53.97	Richard Mavor (NZL)	52.50	Tomasi-Petelo Toto (NCL)	52.46
Javelin throw	Adam Montague (AUS)	64.78	David Thompson (NZL)	56.18	Michael Browne (NZL)	54.14
Pentathlon	Kieran Fowler (NZL)	3199	Carl Dorman (AUS)	2606		
800 metres Medley relay (100m x 100m x 200m x 400m)	Australia; Lars Hansen; Julius Nyambane; Andrew Yong; Jackson Mallory	1:33.59	Papua New Guinea; Daniel Bailey; Sammy Sasama; Andrew Doonar; Andrew Yeweh	1:37.45	New Zealand; Anthony McLellan; Kieran Fowler; Craig Sneddon; Brendan Albrey	1:37.46

=== Girls under 18 (Youth) ===
Event	Gold		Silver		Bronze	
100 metres (wind: 0.4m/s)	Amilia Wallace (AUS)	12.29	Patiola Pahulu (TGA)	12.59	Mystique Jones (NRU)	12.82
200 metres (wind: 0.6m/s)	Miriama Radiniwaimaro (FIJ)	25.18	Toea Wisil (PNG)	25.91	Rachael Cullen (AUS)	26.00
400 metres	Miriama Radiniwaimaro (FIJ)	57.72	Toea Wisil (PNG)	58.82	Sarah Maher (AUS)	59.83
800 metres	Kate Johnston (AUS)	2:16.03	Angela Hallam (AUS)	2:22.56	Cécilia Kumalamelame (PNG)	2:29.43
1500 metres	Kate Johnston (AUS)	4:44.21	Angela Hallam (AUS)	4:55.04	Kavita Maharaj (FIJ)	5:13.92
3000 metres	Leana Peters (GUM)	12:01.55	Nicole Layson (GUM)	12:07.89	June Fataea (SOL)	12:33.41
100 metres hurdles (wind: 2.6m/s)	Rachael Cullen (AUS)	14.52 w	Fiona Morrison (NZL)	14.66 w	Helaina Bannister (AUS)	14.81 w
400 metres hurdles	Fiona Morrison (NZL)	65.03	Chloe Butler (AUS)	65.37	Rachel Phillips (AUS)	67.44
High jump	Kiri Kendall (NZL)	1.72	Amanda West (AUS)	1.60	Hailee Haigh (AUS)	1.55
Long jump	Amanda West (AUS)	5.78 w (wind: 2.1m/s)	Kiri Kendall (NZL)	5.60 (wind: 1.6m/s)	Fanny See (NCL)	5.55 (wind: 1.5m/s)
Triple jump	Kiri Kendall (NZL)	11.72 (wind: 1.4m/s)	Amanda West (AUS)	10.83 w (wind: 3.3m/s)	Kimberley Hinschen (AUS)	10.28 (wind: 2.9m/s)
Shot put	Cindy Toluafe (NCL)	12.20	Danielle Volling-Geoghegan (AUS)	10.76	Megan Parkhill (NZL)	10.66
Discus throw	Cindy Toluafe (NCL)	41.19	Danielle Volling-Geoghegan (AUS)	40.87	Brooke Reynolds (AUS)	39.77
Hammer throw	Kirstin Faint (AUS)	41.08	Jess Charlesworth (NZL)	37.23	Suzy Vercoe (NFK)	35.25
Javelin throw	Rachel Phillips (AUS)	38.96	Katherine Henley (AUS)	38.55	Tekura Kaukura (COK)	33.04
Pentathlon	Kylie Adams (NZL)	2335	Kaati Malua (TGA)	1854	Kimberley Hinschen (AUS)	1839
800 metres Medley relay (100m x 100m x 200m x 400m)	Australia; Amilia Wallace; Narelle Long; Rachael Cullen; Sarah Maher	1:49.76	Papua New Guinea; Liberty Dubo; Jacinta Langa; Toea Wisil; Sharon Henry	1:52.04	New Zealand; Kylie Adams; Jenna Erkila; Fiona Morrison; Nicole Jenness	1:52.65

== Medal table (unofficial) ==
* Host nation (Australia)

Rank	Nation	Gold	Silver	Bronze	Total
1	Australia (AUS)*	15	14	13	42
2	New Zealand (NZL)	11	9	5	25
3	New Caledonia (NCL)	3	1	5	9
4	Fiji (FIJ)	2	0	1	3
5	Tonga (TON)	1	3	1	5
6	Guam (GUM)	1	1	0	2
6	Samoa (SAM)	1	1	0	2
8	French Polynesia (PYF)	1	0	1	2
9	Papua New Guinea (PNG)	0	6	2	8
10	Solomon Islands (SOL)	0	0	2	2
11	Cook Islands (COK)	0	0	1	1
11	Nauru (NRU)	0	0	1	1
11	Norfolk Island (NFK)	0	0	1	1
Totals (13 entries)		35	35	33	103

== Participation (unofficial) ==
An unofficial count yields the number of about 135 athletes from 19 countries:

- American Samoa (8)
- Australia (32)
- Cook Islands (5)
- Fiji (3)
- French Polynesia (4)
- Guam (5)
- Kiribati (6)
- Federated States of Micronesia (2)
- Nauru (5)
- New Caledonia (10)
- New Zealand (16)
- Norfolk Island (3)
- Northern Mariana Islands (4)
- Palau (2)
- Papua New Guinea (9)
- Samoa (5)
- Solomon Islands (6)
- Tonga (8)
- Vanuatu (2)
