= 2026 Oceania U18 Athletics Championships =

Sports competition in Darwin, Australia

- Organisers: Oceania Athletics
- Edition: 18th
- Dates: 18–22 May
- Host city: Darwin
- Venue: Arafura Stadium
- Level: Under 18
- Type: Outdoor
- Events: 37

The 2026 Oceania U18 Athletics Championships, also known colloquially by its former official title, the Oceania Youth Championships, will be an international athletics competition for Oceania athletes qualifying as youths (born no earlier than 1 January 2009). The event is due to be staged in Darwin, Northern Territory, Australia from 18 to 22 May 2026. This will also be the ninth time Australia will host the Championships.

The Championships will be held concurrently with the Senior, U20, Para, Age Group (formerly Masters), and the U16 Championships.

== Event schedule ==
The first draft schedule was published in December 2025.

== Medal table ==
* Host nation (Australia)

Rank	Nation	Gold	Silver	Bronze	Total
Totals (0 entries)		0	0	0	0

== Medal summary ==
=== Boys ===
Event	Gold	Silver	Bronze
100 metres			
200 metres			
400 metres			
800 metres			
1500 metres			
3000 metres			
4 × 100 metres relay			
110 metres hurdles			
400 metres hurdles			
2000 metres steeplechase			
5000 metres walk			
High jump			
Long jump			
Triple jump			
Shot put			
Discus throw			
Javelin throw			
Hammer throw			
WR world record | AR area record | CR championship record | GR games record | NR national record | OR Olympic record | PB personal best | SB season best | WL world leading (in a given season)

* Indicates the athletes only competed in the preliminary heats and received medals

=== Girls ===
Event	Gold	Silver	Bronze
100 metres			
200 metres			
400 metres			
800 metres			
1500 metres			
3000 metres			
4 × 100 metres relay			
100 metres hurdles			
400 metres hurdles			
2000 metres steeplechase			
5000 metres walk			
High jump			
Long jump			
Triple jump			
Shot put			
Discus throw			
Javelin throw			
Hammer throw			
WR world record | AR area record | CR championship record | GR games record | NR national record | OR Olympic record | PB personal best | SB season best | WL world leading (in a given season)

* Indicates the athletes only competed in the preliminary heats and received medals

=== Mixed ===
Event	Gold	Silver	Bronze
4 × 400 metres relay			

== Participating nations ==
All 23 member federations are expected to compete.

- American Samoa (1)
- Australia (81) (Host)
- Cook Islands (2)
- Fiji (9)
- French Polynesia (4)
- Kiribati
- New Caledonia
- New Zealand (52)
- Niue
- Norfolk Island (1)
- Northern Mariana Islands (1)
- Palau (3)
- Papua New Guinea (2)
- Solomon Islands
- Tonga
- Tuvalu
- Wallis and Futuna

Invitational teams

- Hawaii
- (Northern Territory) / (Queensland) Regional Australia (36)
