= 1995 Oceania Youth Athletics Championships =

II Oceania Youth Athletics Championships
- Dates: May 4–5
- Host city: Tereora, Rarotonga, Cook Islands
- Venue: Tereora National Stadium
- Level: Youth
- Events: 31 (16 boys, 15 girls)
- Participation: 135 (77 boys, 58 girls) athletes from 14 nations

The 1995 Oceania Youth Athletics Championships were held at the Tereora National Stadium in Tereora, Rarotonga, Cook Islands, between May 4–5, 1995. A total of 31 events were contested, 16 by boys and 15 by girls.

== Medal summary ==
Complete results can be found on the Athletics Weekly, and on the World Junior Athletics History webpages.

=== Boys under 18 (Youth) ===
Event	Gold		Silver		Bronze	
100 metres (wind: 1.3m/s)	Tim McRae (AUS)	11.22	Silas Helo (SOL)	11.46	Brett Williams (FIJ)	11.50
200 metres	Tim McRae (AUS)	23.04	Silas Helo (SOL)	23.46	Cama Tikomailepanoni (FIJ)	23.58
400 metres	Clyde McIntosh (NZL)	49.6	Andy Henley (NZL)	51.6	Kiel Maemae (VAN)	52.0
800 metres	Clyde McIntosh (NZL)	1:56.30	Sisari Vakasuka (FIJ)	2:01.92	Peter Kaiar (VAN)	2:03.58
1500 metres	Walter Weare (GUM)	4:19.50	Alfred Vola (SOL)	4:20.92	Sisari Vakasuka (FIJ)	4:26.00
3000 metres	Walter Weare (GUM)	9:34.5	Alfred Vola (SOL)	9:40.4	Kaltonga Kalrong (VAN)	10:14.4
2000 metres steeplechase	Nitish Singh (FIJ)	7:03.64	Glen Núñez (NMI)	7:07.40	James Donaldson (NFK)	7:58.58
110 metres hurdles (wind: 0.1m/s)	Ah Chong Sam Chong (SAM)	14.1	Sean Gourley (NZL)	14.2	Steven Richardson (AUS)	14.7
300 metres hurdles	Dean Smith (AUS)	39.72	(French Polynesia) /Heiava Varney (TAH)	42.94	Ioakimo Ioakimo (SAM)	45.12
High jump	Hapo Maliaki (PNG)	1.97	(French Polynesia) /Tutu Degage (TAH)	1.79	Sean Gourley (NZL)	1.79
Long jump	Patrick Fonoti (SAM)	6.68	Aaron Kennedy (AUS)	6.52	Ovini Ralulu (FIJ)	6.41
Triple jump	Clinton Joyce (AUS)	13.83	Steven Richardson (AUS)	13.60	Patrick Fonoti (SAM)	13.12
Shot put	Hohepa Poihipi (NZL)	12.52	Jone Cavubati (FIJ)	11.97	Amanaki Havea (TGA)	11.88
Discus throw	Hohepa Poihipi (NZL)	48.46	Andy Henley (NZL)	42.20	John Ledbrook (AUS)	41.66
Javelin throw	Sean Betland (AUS)	54.98	Fito Scanlan (SAM)	49.94	Ngatamaroa Tangitamaiti (COK)	49.80
800 metres Medley relay (100m x 100m x 200m x 400m)	New Zealand	1:36.00	Australia	1:37.16	Fiji	1:39.62

=== Girls under 18 (Youth) ===
Event	Gold		Silver		Bronze	
100 metres (wind: 0.6m/s)	Adi Waqanitoga (FIJ)	12.48	Sarah Couzens (AUS)	12.68	Freda Gepp (PNG)	13.00
200 metres	Anna Smythe (NZL)	25.1	Adi Waqanitoga (FIJ)	25.8	Sarah Couzens (AUS)	26.9
400 metres	Michelle Dalrymple (AUS)	58.5	Sisilia Dauniwe (FIJ)	62.9	Maine Vaile (COK)	62.9
800 metres	Katrina Gemmell (NZL)	2:16.34	Angela Summerfield (AUS)	2:17.56	Renae Nowland (AUS)	2:23.26
1500 metres	Andrea Lamont (AUS)	4:43.60	Helen Ewing (NZL)	4:49.50	Katrina Gemmell (NZL)	4:55.56
3000 metres	Helen Ewing (NZL)	10:30.80	Andrea Lamont (AUS)	10:40.66	Ekari Raika (FIJ)	11:04.56
100 metres hurdles	Sharen Fidge (AUS)	15.2	Bryony Barker (NZL)	15.9	(French Polynesia) /Christine Coquil (TAH)	19.7
300 metres hurdles	Sharen Fidge (AUS)	47.94	(French Polynesia) /Christine Coquil (TAH)	48.96	Bryony Barker (NZL)	49.62
High jump	Karen Brown (NZL)	1.65	Andrea Smith (AUS)	1.62	Melissa Tucker (AUS)	1.62
Long jump	Sharen Fidge (AUS)	5.44	Jenny Dryburgh (NZL)	5.24	Melissa Tucker (AUS)	5.16
Triple jump	Sharen Fidge (AUS)	11.61	Katrina Cox (AUS)	11.60	Bryony Barker (NZL)	11.56
Shot put	Ngaina Karena (NZL)	11.28	(French Polynesia) /Noella Flores (TAH)	10.57	Maria Tuoro (COK)	10.23
Discus throw	Ngaina Karena (NZL)	39.16	(French Polynesia) /Noella Flores (TAH)	37.46	Melehifo Uhi (TGA)	32.78
Javelin throw	Amber Hooper (AUS)	40.44	Ereti Politini (FIJ)	35.24	Talaiti Kini (FIJ)	35.04
800 metres Medley relay (100m x 100m x 200m x 400m)	Australia	1:50.56	New Zealand	1:50.98	Fiji	1:53.98

== Medal table (unofficial) ==
* Host nation (Cook Islands)

Rank	Nation	Gold	Silver	Bronze	Total
1	Australia (AUS)	13	8	6	27
2	New Zealand (NZL)	11	7	4	22
3	Fiji (FIJ)	2	5	8	15
4	Samoa (SAM)	2	1	2	5
5	Guam (GUM)	2	0	0	2
6	Papua New Guinea (PNG)	1	0	1	2
7	French Polynesia (TAH)	0	5	1	6
8	Solomon Islands (SOL)	0	4	0	4
9	Northern Mariana Islands (NMI)	0	1	0	1
10	Cook Islands (COK)*	0	0	3	3
10	Vanuatu (VAN)	0	0	3	3
12	Tonga (TON)	0	0	2	2
13	Norfolk Island (NFI)	0	0	1	1
Totals (13 entries)		31	31	31	93

== Participation (unofficial) ==
An unofficial count yields the number of about 135 athletes from 14 countries:

- American Samoa (3)
- Australia (18)
- Cook Islands (22)
- Fiji (21)
- Guam (8)
- New Zealand (12)
- Norfolk Island (5)
- Northern Mariana Islands (3)
- Papua New Guinea (6)
- Samoa (9)
- Solomon Islands (7)
- (French Polynesia) /Tahiti (10)
- Tonga (6)
- Vanuatu (5)
