= The Cloncurry Advocate =

Newspaper published in Cloncurry, Queensland between 1889 and 1953

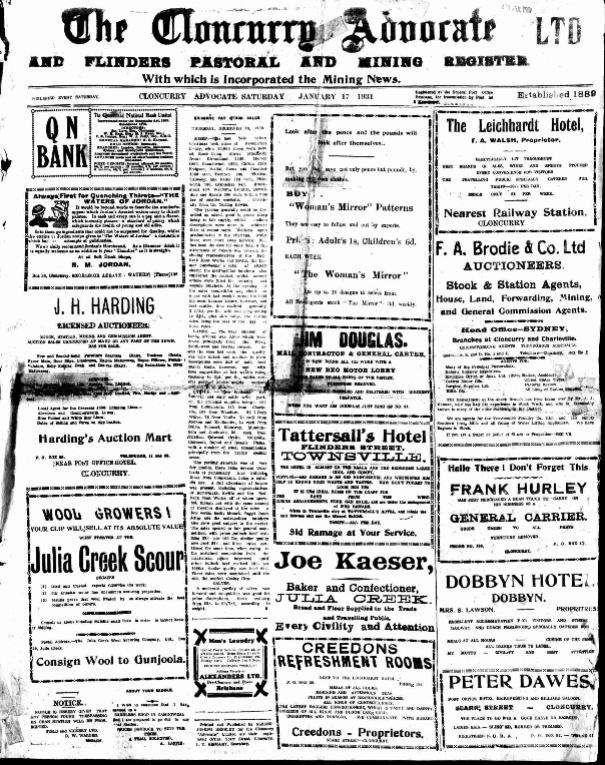
Front page of The Cloncurry Advocate, Saturday 17 January 1931.

The Cloncurry Advocate was a newspaper published in Cloncurry, Queensland, Australia between 1889 and 1953.

== History ==
The Cloncurry Advocate was published by A.J. Hensley from 1989 to 1953. From 1953 to 1966 the Cloncurry Advocate was incorporated with the Western Mail and was renamed the Mt Isa Mail. In 1966 the Mt Isa Mail became the North West Star, which is still in publication.

== Digitisation ==
The paper has been digitised as part of the Australian Newspapers Digitisation Program of the National Library of Australia.

== See also ==
- List of newspapers in Australia
