= 2015 Oceania Youth Athletics Championships =

XIII Oceania Youth Athletics Championships
- Dates: May 8–10
- Host city: Cairns, Queensland, Australia
- Venue: Barlow Park
- Level: Youth
- Events: 42
- Participation: 127 athletes from 16 nations

The 2015 Oceania Youth Athletics Championships were held at the Barlow Park in Cairns, Queensland, Australia, between May 8–10, 2015. They were held together with the 2015 Oceania Area Championships. Detailed reports on a day by day basis were given.

Initially, a total of 44 events were scheduled. However, results for girl's pole vault and mixed 800m sprint medley relay could not be retrieved. The events were most probably cancelled resulting in a total of 42 contested events, 22 by boys and 20 by girls.

== Medal summary ==
Complete results can be found on the Oceania Athletics Association webpage.

=== Boys (U18) ===
Event	Gold		Silver		Bronze	
100 metres (wind: +1.6 m/s)	Brandon Herrigan; Australia	10.71 CR	Johnathon Taylor; Australia	11.00	Jarvis Hansen; New Zealand	11.12
200 metres (wind: +0.8 m/s)	Brandon Herrigan; Australia	21.71 CR	Johnathon Taylor; Australia	21.95	Shane Tuvusa; Fiji	22.22
400 metres	Shane Tuvusa; Fiji	49.52	Ben Mackay; Australia	49.91	Josiah McCarthy (Northern Territory) / (Queensland) Northern Australia	52.90
800 metres	James Uhlenberg; New Zealand	1:59.47	Blair Pennell; New Zealand	2:00.09	Jade Bidgood (Northern Territory) / (Queensland) Northern Australia	2:00.38
1500 metres	James Uhlenberg; New Zealand	4:05.90	Blair Pennell; New Zealand	4:10.43	Jade Bidgood (Northern Territory) / (Queensland) Northern Australia	4:12.67
3000 metres	Joshua Torley; Australia	8:54.84	James Uhlenberg; New Zealand	8:56.95	Liam Cullen; New Zealand	9:39.30
2000 metres steeplechase	Blair Pennell; New Zealand	6:25.14	Liam Cullen; New Zealand	6:59.25	Matthew Macguire (Northern Territory) / (Queensland) Northern Australia	7:56.60
110 metres hurdles (91.4 cm) (wind: +0.5 m/s)	Brandon Herrigan; Australia	13.84 CR	Jarrod Twigg; Australia	14.20	Sitiveni Sulunga; Tonga	14.42
400 metres hurdles (83.8 cm)	Ben Mackay; Australia	54.90	Matthew Harcourt; Australia	55.15	Sam Richardson; Australia	58.29
High jump	John Dodds (Northern Territory) / (Queensland) Northern Australia	2.06m CR	Brenton Foster (Northern Territory) / (Queensland) Northern Australia	2.00m	Teuraiterai Tupaia; French Polynesia	1.94m
Pole vault	Jack Stolarski; Australia	4.30m	Reggie Taumaa; French Polynesia	3.20m		
Long jump	Taurere Teganahau; French Polynesia	6.91m w (wind: +2.5 m/s)	Christopher Goodwin; New Zealand	6.83m w (wind: +3.9 m/s)	Arnold Fage; New Zealand	6.37m (wind: +1.4 m/s)
Triple jump	Jack Stolarski; Australia	13.88m w (wind: +2.8 m/s)	Arnold Fage; New Zealand	13.30m w (wind: +3.5 m/s)	Johnny Quitugua; Guam	12.55m w (wind: +4.6 m/s)
Shot put (5.0 kg)	Raiarii Thompson; French Polynesia	15.89m	Timothy Ford; Australia	15.47m	Nathaniel Mommers; Australia	15.27m
Discus throw (1.5 kg)	Jack Bannister; Australia	50.17m	Timothy Ford; Australia	46.95m	Jean Marc Tafilagi; New Caledonia	46.39m
Hammer throw (5.0 kg)	Nathaniel Mommers; Australia	54.39m	Jack Bannister; Australia	53.62m	Caleb Moore; New Zealand	47.77m
Javelin throw (700g)	Teuraiterai Tupaia; French Polynesia	59.93m	Mahio Patu; French Polynesia	54.79m	Donavin Ada; Northern Mariana Islands	41.02m
Octathlon	Matthew Hosie; Australia	5647 CR	Ben Collerton; New Zealand	5636	Connor Tansley (Northern Territory) / (Queensland) Northern Australia	3187
Decathlon	Theo Watson (Northern Territory) / (Queensland) Northern Australia	6062 CR				
5000 metres walk	Luke McCutcheon; Australia	24:08.84				
4 × 100 metres relay	Australia; Ben Mackay; Johnathon Taylor; Brandon Herrigan; Jarrod Twigg	42.47 CR	New Zealand; Arnold Fage; Jarvis Hansen; Christopher Goodwin; Javon McCallum	43.85	(Northern Territory) / (Queensland) Northern Australia; Jake Doran; Ashley Brooke; Connor Tansley; Maximilian Graf	46.85
4 × 400 metres relay	Australia; Sam Richardson; Luke McCutcheon; Matthew Hosie; Ben Mackay	3:32.52	New Zealand; Javon McCallum; Jarvis Hansen; Blair Pennell; Ben Collerton	3:32.90	(Northern Territory) / (Queensland) Northern Australia; Josiah McCarthy; Jake Doran; Maximilian Graf; Jade Bidgood	3:37.87

=== Girls (U18) ===
Event	Gold		Silver		Bronze	
100 metres (wind: +0.5 m/s)	Olivia Eaton; New Zealand	12.20	Shannon Reynolds (Northern Territory) / (Queensland) Northern Australia	12.31	Miriam Peni; Papua New Guinea	12.43
200 metres (wind: +0.6 m/s)	Olivia Eaton; New Zealand	24.48 CR	Shannon Reynolds (Northern Territory) / (Queensland) Northern Australia	25.02	Hayley Heel; Australia	25.06
400 metres	Amanda Fitisenamu; New Zealand	56.85	Caroline Higham; Australia	57.14	Hannah Schlecht; Australia	57.78
800 metres	Montanna McAvoy (Northern Territory) / (Queensland) Northern Australia	2:19.11	Maxine Paholek; Australia	2:20.88	Tahryn Kellie (Northern Territory) / (Queensland) Northern Australia	2:31.53
1500 metres	Montanna McAvoy (Northern Territory) / (Queensland) Northern Australia	4:44.59	Clio Ozanne-Jaques (Northern Territory) / (Queensland) Northern Australia	4:51.49		
3000 metres	Clio Ozanne-Jaques (Northern Territory) / (Queensland) Northern Australia	10:35.29	Emma Henderson (Northern Territory) / (Queensland) Northern Australia	12:31.38		
2000 metres steeplechase	Rama Kumilgo; Papua New Guinea	7:13.18	Maxine Paholek; Australia	7:15.30		
100 metres hurdles (76.2 cm) (wind: +2.1 m/s)	Karina Brown; Australia	14.34 w	Samantha Johnson; Australia	14.59 w	Emily Bass; Australia	14.71 w
400 metres hurdles	Emily Bass; Australia	64.69 CR	Nicola Bowtell; Australia	67.84		
High jump	Kimberley Jenner (Northern Territory) / (Queensland) Northern Australia	1.76m CR	Emma Meyer; Australia	1.65m	Grace-Kelly Davidson (Northern Territory) / (Queensland) Northern Australia	1.60m
Pole vault	Most probably cancelled					
Long jump	Atipa Mabonga; New Zealand	5.87m w (wind: +4.0 m/s)	Ashleigh Bennett; New Zealand	5.57m (wind: +1.7 m/s)	Emma Hopcroft; New Zealand	5.56m w (wind: +3.3 m/s)
Triple jump	Mikaela Bretz; Australia	12.41m (wind: +1.7 m/s) CR	Taaliyah Markos (Northern Territory) / (Queensland) Northern Australia	11.52m (wind: +1.2 m/s)		
Shot put (3.0 kg)	Julia Bourke; Australia	15.56m CR	Zoe Henare (Northern Territory) / (Queensland) Northern Australia	14.02m	Alexandra Worth (Northern Territory) / (Queensland) Northern Australia	12.33m
Discus throw	Alexandra Worth (Northern Territory) / (Queensland) Northern Australia	40.95m	Rhiann Cull (Northern Territory) / (Queensland) Northern Australia	32.51m	Luciendra Truques; New Caledonia	30.98m
Hammer throw (3.0 kg)	Emma Keleher; Australia	55.45m CR	Emily Rotunno; Australia	53.71m	Jennifer Moss (Northern Territory) / (Queensland) Northern Australia	45.14m
Javelin throw (500g)	Tianah List; Australia	47.30m	Gwoelani Patu; French Polynesia	40.97m	Zoe Henare (Northern Territory) / (Queensland) Northern Australia	37.76m
Heptathlon	Rebekah Gleeson-Cherry (Northern Territory) / (Queensland) Northern Australia	3179				
5000 metres walk	Tahlia Hunt; Australia	27:41.19	Jessica Grech (Northern Territory) / (Queensland) Northern Australia	39:40.90		
4 × 100 metres relay	Australia; Katie Colebourne; Emily Bass; Samantha Johnson; Hayley Heel	49.15 CR	New Zealand; Olivia Eaton; Ashleigh Bennett; Atipa Mabonga; Emma Hopcroft	49.38	(Northern Territory) / (Queensland) Northern Australia; Bridget Seymour-Jones; Kayla Horne; Tayla King; Shannon Reynolds	50.17
4 × 400 metres relay	Australia; Nicola Bowtell; Maxine Paholek; Hannah Schlecht; Caroline Higham	4:01.89 CR	New Zealand; Atipa Mabonga; Ashleigh Bennett; Amanda Fitisenamu; Emma Hopcroft	4:13.08	(Northern Territory) / (Queensland) Northern Australia; Lacey Taylor; Shannon Reynolds; Kayla Horne; Montanna McAvoy	4:14.57

=== Mixed ===
Event	Gold	Silver	Bronze
Mixed 800m sprint medley relay	Most probably cancelled		

== Medal table (unofficial) ==
* Host nation (Australia)

Rank	Nation	Gold	Silver	Bronze	Total
1	Australia*	22	15	6	43
2	(Northern Territory) / (Queensland) Northern Australia	8	8	15	31
3	New Zealand	7	12	5	24
4	French Polynesia	3	3	1	7
5	Fiji	1	0	1	2
5	Papua New Guinea	1	0	1	2
7	New Caledonia	0	0	2	2
8	Guam	0	0	1	1
8	Northern Mariana Islands	0	0	1	1
8	Tonga	0	0	1	1
Totals (10 entries)		42	38	34	114

- Note: Totals include both individual and team medals, with medals in the team competition counting as one medal.

== Participation (unofficial) ==
According to an unofficial count, 127 athletes from 16 countries and territories participated. As in the years before, there was also a "Regional Australia Team" Northern Australia (dubbed "RAT" in the results list) comprising Australian athletes who either have their normal place of residence (defined as being a place where an athlete is resident and/or educated) in an "athletically remote area" of Australia (defined as a being a place more than 300km from any centre at which track and field competition is held on a regular basis i.e. basically weekly or fortnightly during the track season) or "Northern Australia" (defined as comprising the Northern Territory and any parts of Western Australia and North Queensland, north of 26th parallel south latitude).

- American Samoa (4)
- Australia (29)
- Cook Islands (4)
- Fiji (1)
- French Polynesia (10)
- Guam (3)
- Marshall Islands (2)
- Micronesia (2)
- New Caledonia (2)
- New Zealand (18)
- (Northern Territory) / (Queensland) Northern Australia (39)
- Northern Mariana Islands (4)
- Papua New Guinea (2)
- Samoa (2)
- Tonga (3)
- Vanuatu (2)
