= Ernest Henry (explorer) =

British explorer (1837–1919)

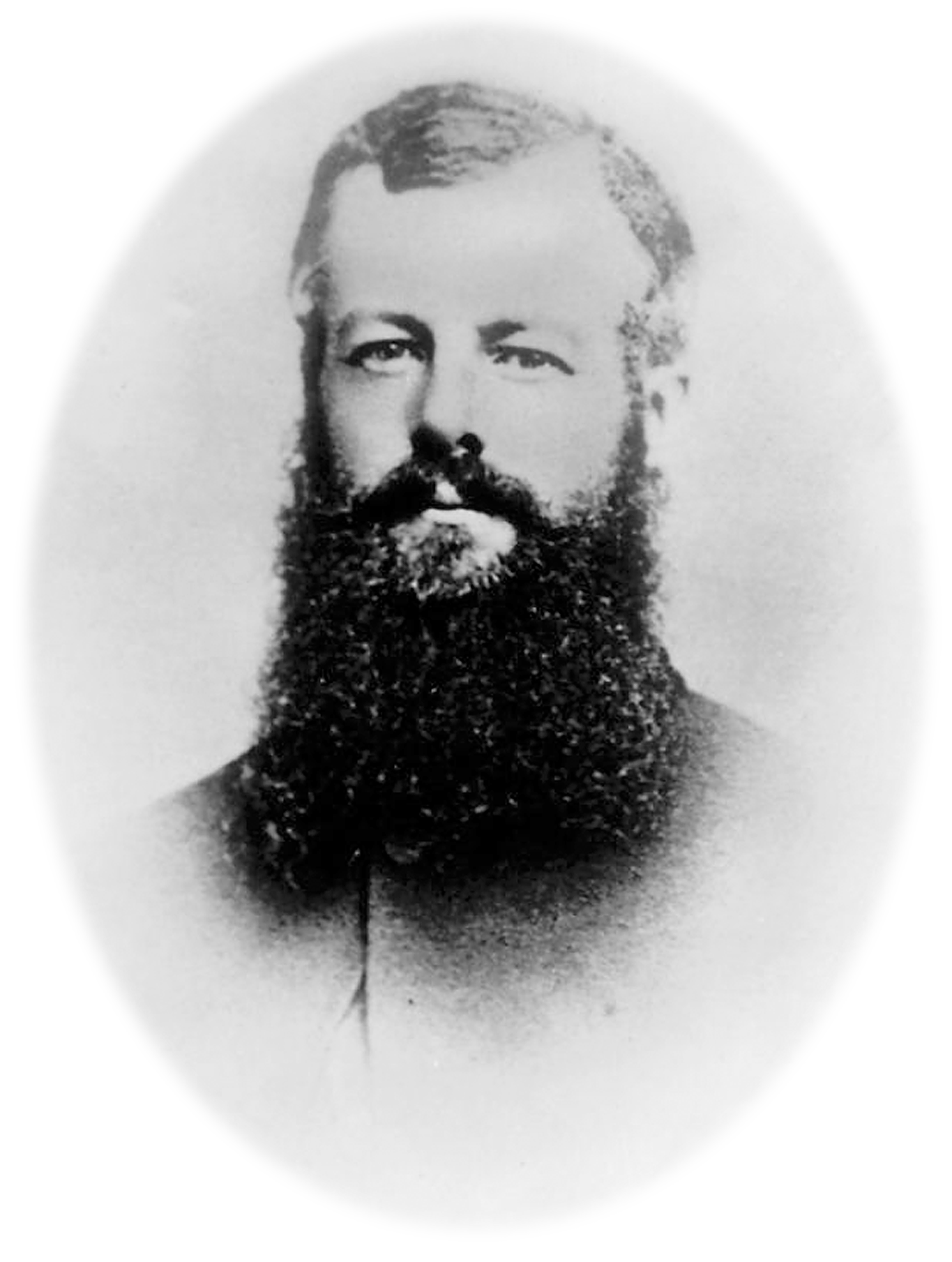
- Portrait of Ernest Henry at the age of 31. Taken in England after his discovery of copper deposits at Cloncurry
- Born: 1 May 1837; Crosthwaite, Cumberland, England
- Died: 26 March 1919 (aged 81); Epping, New South Wales, Australia
- Occupation: Explorer

Ernest Henry (1 May 1837 – 26 March 1919) was an English explorer, prospector and pioneer grazier. He is best known as an explorer of North-West Queensland and was the first settler on a property on the Flinders River which he named Hughenden Station, later the location of the town of Hughenden. He discovered copper in the Cloncurry area and is considered the father of both towns.

Henry's life was summarised by S.E. Pearson in his biographical work, The Prospector of Argylla: "Few men have encompassed more in their lifetime than he, and not many have known greater toil and hardship. In his unassuming way he probably did more for North Queensland than any other man. The wide untrammeled bush was his home and he revelled in it."

== Early life ==
Ernest Henry was born on 1 May 1837 in Crosthwaite, Cumberland (now Cumbria), second son of Captain James Henry of the 72nd Regiment, and Mary Francis, daughter of John Norris of Hughenden Manor, Buckinghamshire. After leaving school he was apprenticed to the sea and on his maiden voyage in 1853 sailed to Australia on the steamship Victoria, one of the vessels of the Australian Royal Mail Steamship Co. He returned to England to serve in the Crimean War.

He emigrated to Australia when he heard that gold had been discovered, arriving in Melbourne with his brothers Arthur and Alfred in 1858 on board the sailing ship Red Jacket. From Melbourne he made his way to Ballarat. Not greatly impressed by prospects on the goldfields, Henry rode to Brisbane with the idea of exploring the outskirts of northern settlement to take up a run of his own. He rode alone, travelling by way of the rivers, through country only sparsely occupied.

== Hughenden Station ==
In Brisbane, Henry met George Elphinstone Dalrymple who was planning an expedition to explore the Burdekin River. Henry was invited to join the expedition in mid-1859. They travelled via the Darling Downs and the upper Burnett River to Rockhampton, and from there to the junction of the Suttor and Burdekin Rivers. Henry accompanied by another expeditioner and an Aboriginal boy made his way back early in the expedition to present his applications for land. During this journey, Henry's party passed through an area with many Aboriginal people and became fearful of the armed Aboriginal warriors who the party believed were pursuing them, and so the party set a dog upon the Aboriginal people and also shot at them.

Henry's participation in Dalrymple's expedition resulted in him securing three pastoral stations: Baroondah (now the locality of Baroondah) on the Dawson River, Mount McConnel at the junction of the Suttor and Burdekin rivers, and Conway (which adjoined Mount McConnel) at the head of Sellheim Creek. By 1861 he and his brother Arthur had stocked them with sheep and cattle driven from southern Queensland properties.

But Henry was never satisfied. His desire for new land and adventure was fed by the reports of Frederick Walker and William Landsborough who returned from their separate searches for Burke and Wills in 1862 with promising reports of the Flinders River country. Henry wanted to view this new country himself and set out from Mount McConnell on 24 November 1863 with a Mr Devlin and his favourite aboriginal boy, Dick. On the Flinders River he took up land which he named Hughenden Station after his mother's childhood home in England, Hughenden Manor. The township of Hughenden was laid out in the same area in 1876.

== Loss of Stations ==
Henry and his "faithful Dick" returned from the Flinders to Mount McConnel in March 1864, and sometime later that year Henry went into Bowen to attend to the sale of some of his properties to cover his increasing debts. In a letter to his mother, Henry called it "rashness and too-eager ambition" to acquire four properties in as many years and attempt to stock and improve them. He was more than £13,000 in debt. Baroondah was the first station to be sold, probably during 1864. Conway was sold the same year, but the buyers alleged misrepresentation. The £8000 they paid remained lodged in a Rockhampton bank until a court could decide the outcome. In the meantime, Henry's creditors were circling.

Henry wrote to his father asking for a £4,500 loan. His father provided £5,000 – but with the condition that Conway and Hughenden were first sold. The difficulties dragged on until the end of 1865 by which time Hughenden had been sold to Henry's cousin, Robert Gray, and all of Henry's remaining assets were consigned, on his father's advice, to his creditors in exchange for his debts.

Henry was chastened by his failure and openly admitted his failings in a letter to his mother dated 23 November 1865. In that letter, Henry again accepts blame, but he also expresses optimism "for fresh exertions with a less aspiring, though steadier and more calculating, zeal. I am not daunted, but rather urged on by misfortune, which creates in me a fresh desire for action".

On the loss of his properties, Henry focussed his attention on the country west of Hughenden Station with the object of acquiring another run. At Eastern Creek (near the present-day township of Julia Creek), he saw the tracks of Duncan McIntyre who had passed north just a few weeks before with a party of men in search of Ludwig Leichhardt. Henry and McIntyre, separately, were heading to Burketown. McIntyre arrived there on 20 April 1866; Henry on the 26th. Both stayed in the vicinity for some weeks and both caught "gulf fever". Henry survived, McIntyre didn't.

8 May 1866 – I was awfully bad when I got up in the morning, suffering chiefly from fearful shooting pains down the right side of my head. We luckily had a fair wind up the river. I laid on and under blankets at the bottom of the boat. The pains in my head came so quick and sharp sometimes as to take away my breath, and for the life of me I could no help crying out. I clenched my teeth and did all I could but had no power to help it.

Henry returned to Hughenden Station to recuperate.

== Discovery of Cloncurry Copper ==
On an exploring trip in the Cloncurry region in 1867, Henry found lumps of a heavy black mineral and took samples to Peak Downs, the nearest settlement inland from Rockhampton, to report and register their find. The mineral proved to be iron ore, a worthless find as the deposit was too distant from the nearest port.

Henry again returned to the Cloncurry area with his aboriginal boy, Dick, fossicking for minerals. On 20 May 1867 he found the mother lode of copper that became the Great Australian Mine. In 1876 the township of Cloncurry was laid out by Surveyor William H Bishop, the same man who laid out the township of Hughenden.

Henry worked the Great Australian Mine, bagging and exporting copper ore, until it was sold in 1879. Although the lode was rich, copper was low in value, and it was costly to cart ore to Normanton and bring stores to the mine.

In 1882 he discovered copper mines at Argylla, 50 miles west of Cloncurry, and at Mount Oxide, 90 miles from Argylla. Writing to his mother in the same year he said:

When I first made the discovery of copper in this district there was not a white man within a hundred miles and great tracts of country lay in every direction, unpopulated save by a few tribes of savages. At the present moment it would be difficult to find a patch of available land that has not been secured by squatters. Hitherto they have been cattlemen, but now the southern capitalists are turning their attention to our northern prairies and are introducing sheep. Sheep have always been the harbingers of prosperity to all good grazing districts.

In 1883 Tarsis Copper Smelting Company began work on the Great Australian mine. A furnace, rail tracks, rail trucks and other mining equipment were dragged from Normanton. But the mine soon closed and the furnace on the bank of the Coppermine Creek decayed into a rusty Cloncurry landmark.

== Final years ==
Henry disposed of his various mining leases over the years, and by 1913 the last of his holdings, Mount Oxide, had been sold for £40,000. He lived alone at the Grange on the outskirts of Cloncurry. His wife, Marian Elizabeth Thompson, whom he had married in 1870 and by whom he had three children, died in 1888. Henry died at Epping, New South Wales, on 26 March 1919.

== Legacy ==
To commemorate Henry's importance to the Cloncurry area, the Ernest Henry mine, 38 kilometres north-east of Cloncurry, was named in his honour and began commercial production in 1998 as an open-pit copper mine.
