= Ernest Henry mine =

Mine in Queensland, Australia

- Location within Queensland
- Location: 36 km (22 mi) north-east of Cloncurry, Queensland, Australia; 20.4476°S 140.7136°E
- Products: Copper, gold and silver
- Opened: March 1998 (open pit); December 2011 (underground)
- Company: Ernest Henry Mining (subsidiary of Evolution Mining)
- Website: www.ernesthenrymining.com.au

The Ernest Henry mine is a large copper mine located in eastern Australia, 36 km (22 mi) north-east of Cloncurry in the state of Queensland. Ernest Henry represents one of the largest copper reserves in Australia and in the world having estimated reserves of 167 million tonnes of ore grading 1.1% copper and 2.67 million oz of gold. Silver is also produced at the mine. The mine produced 64,000 tonnes of copper and 92,000 ounces of gold in the financial year to 2021.

== History ==
Commercial operations at the site began as an open-cut mine in 1998. Plans to transition to underground mining were announced in 2009. In June 2023, the mine announced that operations would continue till at least 2040.

In March 2023, the mine closed for six weeks after flood water entered the site.

== Operations ==
Ernest Henry is an underground mining operation. A 1,000 m (3,300 ft) hoisting shaft brings ore to the surface. Traditional grinding and flotation methods in the concentrator is used to extract copper and gold. Concentrate is treated at Glencore’s Mount Isa Mines smelter and metal is refined at Glencore’s Townsville refinery.

== See also ==
- List of mines in Australia
- Mining in Australia
