= Oceania U18 Athletics Championships =

Biennial championships by Oceania Athletics Association

- Status: Active
- Genre: Under-18 athletics Oceania Championships
- Date: Varying
- Frequency: Biennial
- Country: Varying
- Years active: 33
- Inaugurated: March 15, 1993 (as 1993 Oceania Youth Athletics Championships)
- Previous event: 2024 Suva
- Next event: 2026 Darwin
- Organiser: Oceania Athletics

The Oceania Youth Athletics Championships is an athletics event organized by the Oceania Athletics Association (OAA) open for youth (U18) athletes from member and associate member associations. The competition is held biennially for the first time in 1993 until 1999, and between 2000 and 2008 together with the Oceania Open Championships. In 2010 and 2011, it was held together with the Australian Junior Athletics Championships (U14 to U20), and in 2013 again together with the Oceania Open Championships.

== Editions ==
| Number | Year | City | Country | Date | Venue | No. of Events | No. of Athletes |
|---|---|---|---|---|---|---|---|
| 1 | 1993 | Canberra, ACT | Australia | March 15–16 | | 29 | 96 |
| 2 | 1995 | Tereora, Rarotonga | Cook Islands | May 4–5 | Tereora National Stadium | 31 | 135 |
| 3 | 1997 | Suva, Viti Levu | Fiji | July 11–12 | National Stadium | 33 | 170 |
| 4 | 1999 | Santa Rita | Guam | July 2–3 | | 30 | 116 |
| 5 | 2000 | Adelaide, South Australia | Australia | August 24–26 | Santos Stadium | 33 | 97 |
| 6 | 2002 | Christchurch, Canterbury | New Zealand | December 12–14 | Queen Elizabeth II Park | 34 | 96 |
| 7 | 2004 | Townsville, Queensland | Australia | December 18 | Townsville Sports Reserve | 35 | 135 |
| 8 | 2006 | Apia, Upolu | Samoa | December 13–16 | Apia Park | 37 | 148 |
| 9 | 2008 | Saipan | Northern Mariana Islands | June 25–28 | Oleai Sports Complex | 37 | 112 |
| 10 | 2010 | Sydney, New South Wales | Australia | March 11–14 | Sydney Olympic Park Athletic Centre | 42 | 74 + 309 from Australia |
| 11 | 2011 | Sydney, New South Wales | Australia | March 10–14 | Sydney Olympic Park Athletic Centre | 40 | 25 + 331 from Australia |
| 12 | 2013 | Papeete, Tahiti | French Polynesia | June 3–5 | Stade Pater Te Hono Nui | 40 | 116 |
| 13 | 2015 | Cairns, Queensland | Australia | May 8–10 | Barlow Park | 44 | |
| 14 | 2017 | Suva | Fiji | 28 June – 1 July | National Stadium | | |
| 15 | 2019 | Townsville | Australia | 25–28 June | Townsville Sports Reserve | | |
| 16 | 2022 | Mackay | Australia | 7–9 June | Mackay Aquatic and Recreation Centre | | |
| 17 | 2024 | Suva | Fiji | 4–8 June | HFC Bank Stadium | | |
| 18 | 2026 | Darwin | Australia | 18–22 May | Arafura Stadium | | |

== Championships records ==
=== Boys ===
| Event | Record | Athlete | Nationality | Date | Championships | Place | Age | Ref. |
|---|---|---|---|---|---|---|---|---|
| 100 m | 10.53 (+1.0 m/s) | Toshi Butlin | Australia | 7 June 2022 | 2022 Championships | Mackay, Australia | 17 years, 108 days | |
| 200 m | 21.06 (±0.0 m/s) | Gout Gout | Australia | 6 June 2024 | 2024 Championships | Suva, Fiji | 16 years, 160 days | |
| 400 m | 47.00 | Dylan Ruming | Australia | 19 May 2026 | 2026 Championships | Darwin, Australia | | |
| 800 m | 1:50.37 | Daniel Williams | Australia | 7 June 2024 | 2024 Championships | Suva, Fiji | 16 years, 309 days | |
| 1500 m | 3:49.62 | Cameron Myers | Australia | 7 June 2022 | 2022 Championships | Mackay, Australia | 15 years, 363 days | |
| 3000 m | 8:36.91 | Jude Thomas | Australia | 28 June 2019 | 2019 Championships | Townsville, Australia | 17 years, 103 days | |
| 110 m hurdles (91.4 cm) | 13.36 (+0.9 m/s) | Joshua Kalozi | Australia | 9 June 2022 | 2022 Championships | Mackay, Australia | 17 years, 69 days | |
| 400 m hurdles (84.0 cm) | 53.34 | Rianco Haggard | New Zealand | 18 May 2026 | 2026 Championships | Darwin, Australia | 17 years, 118 days | |
| 2000 m steeplechase (91.4 cm) | 5:56.21 | Nicholas McGill | Australia | 6 June 2024 | 2024 Championships | Suva, Fiji | | |
| High jump | 2.09 m | Ethan Gration | Australia | 18 May 2026 | 2026 Championships | Darwin, Australia | 16 years, 243 days | |
| Pole vault | 4.70 m | Luca Denee | New Zealand | 3 June 2013 | 2013 Championships | Pirae, French Polynesia | | |
| Long jump | 7.48 m (+1.6 m/s) | Bailey Burns | Australia | 6 June 2024 | 2024 Championships | Suva, Fiji | 17 years, 83 days | |
| Triple jump | 15.36 (+1.1 m/s) | Lian Anagnostopoulos | Australia | 7 June 2024 | 2024 Championships | Suva, Fiji | 16 years, 340 days | |
| Shot put (5 kg) | 18.69 m | Robert Marchesi-Scott | Australia | 7 June 2022 | 2022 Championships | Mackay, Australia | 16 years, 341 days | |
| Discus throw (1.5 kg) | 58.75 m | Angus Ewing | Australia | 19 May 2026 | 2026 Championships | Darwin, Australia | 16 years, 168 days | |
| Hammer throw (5 kg) | 68.32 m | Benjamin Voogd | Australia | 27 June 2019 | 2019 Championships | Townsville, Australia | | |
| Javelin throw (700 g) | 67.40 m | Lachlan Buckman | Australia | 7 June 2022 | 2022 Championships | Mackay, Australia | | |
| Octathlon | 5647 pts | Matthew Hosie | Australia | 8–9 May 2015 | 2015 Championships | Cairns, Australia | | |
| Octathlon | 100m (wind) / Long jump (wind) / Shot put / 400m / 110m H (wind) / High jump / Javelin / 1000m; 11.58 (±0.0 m/s) / 6.44 m (+1.6 m/s) / 14.72 m / 52.43 / 15.57 (−0.9 m/s) / 1.79 m / 52.76 m / 2:53.42 | | | | | | | |
| Decathlon | 6859 pts | Liam Gilbert | Australia | 25-26 June 2019 | 2019 Championships | Townsville, Australia | | |
| Decathlon | 100m (wind) / Long jump (wind) / Shot put / High jump / 400m / 110m H (wind) / Discus / Pole vault / Javelin / 1500m; 11.09 (+0.7 m/s) / 6.68 m (+1.0 m/s) / 13.02 m / 1.86 m / 51.66 / 14.34 (+1.9 m/s) / 42.09 m / 3.70 m / 37.01 m / 4:49.81 | | | | | | | |
| 5000 m walk | 21:25.83 | Bailey Housden | Australia | 7 June 2024 | 2024 Championships | Suva, Fiji | 16 years, 247 days | |
| 4 × 100 m relay | 41.34 | Kai Gale; Zavier Peacock; Jonathan Kasiano; Gout Gout | Australia | 7 June 2024 | 2024 Championships | Suva, Fiji | 17 years, 17 days 16 years, 51 days 15 years, 360 days 16 years, 161 days | |
| 4 × 400 m relay | 3:15.74 | Seth Kennedy; Caleb Kilpatrick; Adam Beiers; Austin Fernando | Australia | 4 June 2024 | 2024 Championships | Suva, Fiji | 16 years, 106 days 17 years, 9 days 17 years, 107 days 16 years, 336 days | |

=== Girls ===
| Event | Record | Athlete | Nationality | Date | Championships | Place | Age | Ref. |
|---|---|---|---|---|---|---|---|---|
| 100 m | 11.67 (+1.8 m/s) | Talia van Rooyen | New Zealand | 7 June 2022 | 2022 Championships | Mackay, Australia | 15 years, 360 days | |
| 200 m | 24.30 (−1.8 m/s) | Kendra Scally-Tu'i | New Zealand | 7 June 2024 | 2024 Championships | Suva, Fiji | 15 years, 323 days | |
| 400 m | 53.80 | Alice Hill | Australia | 19 May 2026 | 2026 Championships | Darwin, Australia | 16 years, 327 days | |
| 800 m | 2:07.39 | Zoe St John | Australia | 18 May 2026 | 2026 Championships | Darwin, Australia | 16 years, 69 days | |
| 1500 m | 4:30.81 | Imogen Gardiner | Australia | 26 June 2019 | 2019 Championships | Townsville, Australia | | |
| 3000 m | 9:56.76 | Ella Rodwell | Australia | 9 June 2022 | 2022 Championships | Mackay, Australia | 17 years, 15 days | |
| 100 m hurdles (76.2 cm) | 13.62 (−0.4 m/s) | Tammin Lampret | Australia | 7 June 2024 | 2024 Championships | Suva, Fiji | 16 years, 135 days | |
| 400 m hurdles (76.2 cm) | 1:00.18 | Mia Shelley | Australia | 18 May 2026 | 2026 Championships | Darwin, Australia | 15 years, 163 days | |
| 2000 m steeplechase (76.2 cm) | 6:47.53 | Milla Roberts | Australia | 6 June 2024 | 2024 Championships | Suva, Fiji | 17 years, 90 days | |
| High jump | 1.79 m | Kimberley Jenner | Australia | 9 May 2015 | 2015 Championships | Cairns, Australia | | |
| Pole vault | 3.95 m | Olivia Gross | Australia | 28 June 2019 | 2019 Championships | Townsville, Australia | 16 years, 303 days | |
| Long jump | 6.20 m (+0.1 m/s) | Tomysha Clark | Australia | 26 June 2019 | 2019 Championships | Townsville, Australia | 16 years, 226 days | |
| Triple jump | 12.45 m (+0.1 m/s) | Zoe Chester | Australia | 8 June 2022 | 2022 Championships | Mackay, Australia | 15 years, 214 days | |
| Shot put (3 kg) | 16.99 m | Allira Takau | Australia | 5 June 2024 | 2024 Championships | Suva, Fiji | 16 years, 180 days | |
| Discus throw | 52.92 m | Lyvante Su'Emai | Australia | 25 June 2019 | 2019 Championships | Townsville, Australia | | |
| Hammer throw (3 kg) | 61.77 m | Stephanie Ratcliffe | Australia | 30 June 2017 | 2017 Championships | Suva, Fiji | 16 years, 183 days | |
| Javelin throw (500 g) | 53.27 m | Tallara Joseph-Riogi | Australia | 19 May 2026 | 2026 Championships | Darwin, Australia | 16 years, 245 days | |
| Heptathlon | 5398 pts | Camryn Newton-Smith | Australia | 28-29 June 2017 | 2017 Championships | Suva, Fiji | 17 years, 63 days | |
| Heptathlon | 100m H (wind) / High jump / Shot put / 200m (wind) / Long jump (wind) / Javelin / 800m; 14.06 (NWI) / 1.71 m / 11.39 m / 25.80 (NWI) / 5.70 m (NWI) / 43.09 m / 2:34.40 | | | | | | | |
| 5000 m walk | 24:41.51 | Zoe Woods | Australia | 7 June 2024 | 2022 Championships | Mackay, Australia | 14 years, 228 days | |
| 4 × 100 m relay | 46.70 | Tammin Lampret; Leah O'Brien; Charlotte McAuliffe; Shari Hurdman | Australia | 7 June 2024 | 2024 Championships | Suva, Fiji | 16 years, 135 days 16 years, 130 days 17 years, 113 days 17 years, 100 days | |
| 4 × 400 m relay | 3:45.10 | Jemma Pollard; Ivy Boothroyd; Alesha Bennetts; Paige Campbell | Australia | 9 June 2022 | 2022 Championships | Mackay, Australia | 17 years, 52 days 15 years, 144 days 17 years, 55 days 17 years, 73 days | |

=== Mixed ===
| Event | Record | Athlete | Nation | Date | Meet | Place | Age | Ref. |
|---|---|---|---|---|---|---|---|---|
| 4 × 400 m relay | 3:37.03 | Noa King; Boh Ritchie; Hunter Scott; Holly Fausett | New Zealand | 7 June 2024 | 2024 Championships | Suva, Fiji | 15 years, 298 days 17 years, 120 days 17 years, 151 days 16 years, 350 days | |
