= Glenn Howard (disambiguation) =

Glenn Howard (born 1962) is a Canadian curler.

Glenn Howard may also refer to:

- Glenn L. Howard (1939–2012), Democratic member of the Indiana Senate
- Glenn Howard (footballer) (born 1962), Australian rules footballer
- Glenn Howard (athlete) (born 1976), New Zealand high jumper
- Glenn Howard (Gene Barry), fictional character from The Name of the Game

== See also ==
- Howard Glenn (1934–1960), American gridiron football player
