= 2026 Oceania Para Athletics Championships =

Paralympic track and field event

- Host city: Darwin, Northern Territory, Australia
- Events: 34
- Dates: 18–23 May 2026
- Main venue: Arafura Stadium

The 2026 Oceania Para Athletics Championships will be third Oceania Para Athletics Championships for Oceania athletes with a disability. It will be held at the Arafura Stadium in Darwin, Northern Territory from 18 to 23 May 2026.

The Championships will be staged concurrently with the 2026 Senior, U18, U20 and Age Group and U16 Championships.

== Classification ==
All athletes are classified according to their impairment and competition is a combined format where athletes of multiple different classifications compete against each other. Each classification consists of a three character code, starting with a letter and followed by a two-digit number. The letter specifies the event type: T for track and jumping events, and F for throwing events. The first digit of the number specifies the type of impairment and the second digit the severity of the impairment; the lower the second number, the more impaired.

- T/F11–13 (visual impairment)
- T/F20 (intellectual impairment)
- T/F31–34 (wheelchair events for athletes with a movement disorder, including cerebral palsy)
- T/F35–38 (ambulant events for athletes with a movement disorder, including cerebral palsy)
- T/F40–41 (short stature, including dwarfism)
- T/F42–44 (leg impairment, lower limb affected by limb deficiency, leg length difference, impaired muscle power or impaired range of movement)
- T/F45–47 (arm impairment, upper limbs affected by limb deficiency, impaired muscle power or impaired range of movement)
- T/F51–57 (wheelchair events for athletes with a lower body impairment, including paraplegia)
- T/F61-64 (Lower limb/s competing with prosthesis affected by limb deficiency and leg length difference)

== Event schedule ==
The first draft schedule was published in December 2025.

Legend
Key	P	Q	H	½	F
Value	Preliminary round	Qualifiers	Heats	Semifinals	Final

M = morning session, E = evening session

Men
Date	May 18		May 19		May 20		May 21	May 22	May 23	
Event	M	E	M	E	M	E	M	E	M	E
Ambulant
100 m	H	F								
200 m			H	F						
400 m					H	F				
800 m							F			
1500 m									F	
Long jump		F								
Shot put						F				
Discus throw								F		
Javelin throw		F								
Wheelchair/seated
100 m	H	F								
200 m			H	F						
400 m					H	F				
800 m							F			
1500 m										F
Shot put	F									
Discus throw						F				
Javelin throw				F						

Women
Date	May 18		May 19		May 20		May 21	May 22	May 23	
Event	M	E	M	E	M	E	M	E	M	E
Ambulant
100 m	H	F								
200 m			H	F						
400 m					H	F				
800 m							F			
1500 m									F	
Long jump		F								
Shot put	F									
Discus throw								F		
Javelin throw	F									
Wheelchair/seated
100 m	H	F								
200 m			H	F						
400 m					H	F				
800 m							F			
1500 m										F
Shot put		F								
Discus throw						F				
Javelin throw				F						

== Medal table ==
* Host nation (Australia)

Rank	Nation	Gold	Silver	Bronze	Total
Totals (0 entries)		0	0	0	0

== Results ==
=== Men ===
Event	Gold		Silver		Bronze	
100 m ambulant	Ullrich Muller (T38); Australia Thomas Owens (T71/F32); Australia	11.13 (96.49%) 21.67 (101.93%)	Livu Levusakapoe (T41); Vanuatu	14.04 (94.37%)	Alexander McKillop (T37); Australia	12.44 (94.21%)
200 m ambulant	Benjamin Kalenjuk (T/F21); Australia	28.77 (95.58%)	Mitchell Warrilow (T38); Australia	23.31 (93.60%)	Mitchell Joynt (T64); New Zealand	22.89 (92.92%)
400 m ambulant	Mitchell Warrilow (T38); Australia	51.47 (95.84%)	Cooper Robb-Jackson (T38); Australia	55.48 (88.91%)	Archie Dixon (T38); Australia	56.82 (86.81%)
800 m ambulant	Mitchell Warrilow (T38); Australia	2:05.54 (92.20%)	Archie Dixon (T38); Australia	2:06.58 (91.44%)	Aaron Houston (T20); Australia	2:19.01 (79.06%)
1500 m ambulant	Aaron Houston (T20); Australia Kyle McIntosh (T20); Regional Australia	4:37.33 (81.31%) 4:25.78 (84.84%)	Daniel Kits (T37); New Zealand	5:25.39 (73.23%)		
Long jump ambulant	Benjamin Kalenjuk (T/F21); Australia	3.97m (82.19%)	Zac Harding (T/F36); Australia Kayne Kellett (T37); Regional Australia	4.26m (70.41%) 5.07m (74.88%)	Finn Tregurtha-Nairn (T38); New Zealand Lindsay Hendy (TF20); Regional Australia	5.13m (70.17%) 5.58m (73.03%)
Shot put ambulant	Lee O'Halloran (F46); Australia	14.77m (87.91%)	Mark Everett (T/F38); Australia	13.06m (81.88%)	Jack Adams (F46); New Zealand	11.60m (69.04%)
Discus throw ambulant	Mark Everett (T/F38); Australia	39.72m ( %)	Sam Paech (F37); Australia	34.18m ( %)	Zack Lappin (F37); New Zealand	34.02 ( %)
Javelin throw ambulant	Malachi Canning (T/F20); Australia Regional Australia	37.61m ( %)	Jack Adams (F46); New Zealand	36.62m ( %)	Lindsay Hendy (T/F20); Australia Regional Australia	36.60m ( %)
Shot put seated	Vitolio Kavakava (F57); New Caledonia	12.25m ( %)	Matthew Sheppard (F56); Australia	10.21m ( %)	Jerome Bunge (F57); Papua New Guinea	8.44m ( %)
Discus throw seated	Vitolio Kavakava (F57); New Caledonia	33.82m ( %)	Jerome Bunge (F57); Papua New Guinea	29.76m ( %)		
Javelin throw seated	Vitolio Kavakava (F57); New Caledonia	40.57m ( %)	Jerome Bunge (F57); Papua New Guinea	30.90m ( %)		

=== Women ===
Event	Gold		Silver		Bronze	
100 m ambulant	Telaya Blacksmith (T20); Australia	12.44 ( %)	Danielle Aitchison (T36); New Zealand	13.20 ( %)	Briseis Brittain (T38); Australia	13.40 ( %)
200 m ambulant	Telaya Blacksmith (T20); Australia	25.34 ( %)	Natalie Millerd (T47); Australia	27.21 ( %)	Danielle Aitchison (T36); New Zealand	27.49 ( %)
400 m ambulant	Telaya Blacksmith (T20); Australia	59.29 ( %)	Alison Reidy (T38); Australia	1:05.60 ( %)	Anouk Laverty (T38); Australia	1:10.06 ( %)
800 m ambulant	Tamsin Colley (T36); Australia	2:52.34 ( %)				
1500 m ambulant	Belinda Scott (T20); Australia	5:42.80 ( %)				
Long jump ambulant	Telaya Blacksmith (T20); Australia	5.23m ( %)	Caytyln Sharp (T20); Australia	4.91m ( %)	Layla Sharp (T38); Australia	4.84m ( %)
Shot put ambulant	Lisa Adams (F37); New Zealand	13.61m ( %)	Holly Robinson (F46); New Zealand	12.83m ( %)	Sionann Murphy (F37); New Zealand	9.55m ( %)
Discus throw ambulant	Charli Gardiner-Hall (F37); New Zealand	28.57m ( %)	Naibili Vatunisolo (F42); Fiji	25.66m ( %)	Lauren Blackmore (F46); New Zealand	25.41m ( %)
Javelin throw ambulant	Regina Edward (F44); Papua New Guinea	29.14m ( %)	Caytlyn Sharp (F20); Australia	26.71m ( %)	Rose Welepa (F12); New Caledonia	23.13m ( %)
100 m wheelchair	Anna Pipisega (T54/F55); New Caledonia	24.57( %)				
200 m wheelchair	Anna Pipisega (T54/F55); New Caledonia	43.51 ( %)				
Discus throw seated	Josephine Dooley (F34); Australia	6.15m ( %)	Julie Charlton (F57); Australia	6.04m ( %)	Anna Pipisega (T54/F55); New Caledonia	5.68m ( %)
Javelin throw seated	Indygo Prebble (F57); Australia	14.72m ( %)	Anna Pipisega (T54/F55); New Caledonia	12.01m ( %)	Julie Charlton (F57); Australia	11.23m ( %)

== Participating nations ==
All 23 member federations are expected to compete.

- American Samoa
- Australia (28) (Host)
- Cook Islands
- Fiji (5)
- French Polynesia
- Guam
- Kiribati
- Marshall Islands
- Federated States of Micronesia
- Nauru
- New Caledonia
- New Zealand (22)
- Niue
- Norfolk Island
- Northern Mariana Islands
- Palau
- Papua New Guinea
- Samoa
- Solomon Islands
- Tonga
- Tuvalu
- Vanuatu
- Wallis and Futuna

Invitational teams

- (Northern Territory) / (Queensland) Regional Australia (7)
