= 2013 Oceania Youth Athletics Championships =

XII Oceania Youth Athletics Championships
- Dates: June 3–5
- Host city: Papeete, Tahiti, French Polynesia
- Venue: Stade Pater Te Hono Nui
- Level: Youth (U18)
- Events: 40 (21 boys, 19 girls)
- Participation: 116 athletes from 15 + 2 regional teams nations

The 2013 Oceania Youth Athletics Championships were held at the Stade Pater Te Hono Nui in Papeete, French Polynesia, between June 3–5, 2013. They were held together with the 2013 Oceania Open Championships. Detailed reports on a day by day basis were given.

A total of 40 events were contested, 21 by boys and 19 by girls.

== Medal summary ==
Complete results can be found on the Oceania Athletics Association webpage.

=== Boys (U18) ===
Event	Gold		Silver		Bronze	
100 metres (wind: -0.4 m/s)	Joshua Billington; New Zealand	11.03	Austen Heuvel; New Zealand	11.08	Jacob Matson; New Zealand	11.15
200 metres (wind: -1.5 m/s)	James Kermond; Australia	22.07	Namataiki Tevenino; French Polynesia	23.41	Faresa Kapisi; American Samoa	23.51
400 metres	James Kermond; Australia	47.93	Bailey Stewart; New Zealand	48.88	Joshua Ledger; New Zealand	49.61
800 metres	Bailey Stewart; New Zealand	1:56.88	Joshua Ledger; New Zealand	1:58.53	Tom Joe; Vanuatu	2:02.46
1500 metres	Joshua Kentwell; Australia	4:04.91	Jordan De Spong; New Zealand	4:08.23	Tom Joe; Vanuatu	4:12.74
3000 metres	Rosfelo Siosi; Solomon Islands	9:35.93	Louis Ligerot; French Polynesia	9:56.37	Etienne Fleure; Tahiti West Coast	10:09.27
2000 metres steeplechase	Joshua Kentwell; Australia	6:23.80	Jordan De Spong; New Zealand	6:27.18	Lilian Boileau; French Polynesia	7:17.94
110 metres hurdles (wind: +0.1 m/s)	Eliot Wilkins; Australia	14.61	Luca Denee; New Zealand	15.45		
400 metres hurdles	Rene Zacchini; Australia	55.09	Josh Stockill; Australia	55.11		
High jump	Cory McDermott; New Zealand	1.95m	Robin Hilaire; French Polynesia	1.85m	Taurere Teganahau; French Polynesia	1.70m
Pole vault	Luca Denee; New Zealand	4.70m	Robin Hilaire; French Polynesia	3.60m	Reggie Taumaa; French Polynesia	3.00m
Long jump	Joshua Billington; New Zealand	6.85m (wind: -0.4 m/s)	Taurere Teganahau; French Polynesia	6.36m (wind: +0.0 m/s)	Sean Pay; New Zealand	6.12m (wind: +0.0 m/s)
Triple jump	Sean Pay; New Zealand	13.35m (wind: +0.0 m/s)	Caleb Bensemann; New Zealand	13.03m (wind: +0.0 m/s)		
Shot put	Sandy Dalton; Australia	16.48m	Ashley Craig; New Zealand	16.02m	Toriki Rey; French Polynesia	11.29m
Discus throw	Sandy Dalton; Australia	49.19m	Ashley Craig; New Zealand	38.60m	Taui Saisai Hauma; Tuvalu	29.71m
Hammer throw	Sandy Dalton; Australia	65.11m	Ashley Craig; New Zealand	49.59m		
Javelin throw	Robin Hilaire; French Polynesia	48.33m				
Octathlon	Aaron Booth; New Zealand	5231	Joseph Staladi; New Zealand	4486	Robin Hilaire; French Polynesia	4401
5000 metre Walk	Kyle Bird; Australia	25:33.61				
4 x 100 metres relay	New Zealand; Rene Zacchini; Josh Stockill; Patrick Frith; James Kermond	45.10				
4 x 400 metres relay	Australia} Rene Zacchini; Josh Stockill; Patrick Frith; James Kermond	3:22.83	New Zealand; Bailey Stewart; Jordan De Spong; Joshua Ledger; Caleb Bensemann	3:27.89		

=== Girls (U18) ===
Event	Gold		Silver		Bronze	
100 metres (wind: -0.5 m/s)	Mikaela Jefferson; New Zealand	12.52	Raquel Walker; Guam	13.03	Christina Ashton; New Zealand	13.03
200 metres (wind: +0.3 m/s)	Carlie Whitford; Australia	26.15	Raquel Walker; Guam	26.71	Regine Tugade; Guam	26.84
400 metres	Alina Tape; Australia	58.86	Jemima Tennekoon; New Zealand	59.91	Rita Fontaine (Northern Territory) / (Queensland) North Australia	60.77
800 metres	Alina Tape; Australia	2:11.41	Arianna Lord; New Zealand	2:11.45	Isabella Smith; Australia	2:11.90
1500 metres	Arianna Lord; New Zealand	4:40.48	Isabella Smith; Australia	4:40.77	Bethany Croft; Australia	4:58.70
3000 metres	Chloe Andres; French Polynesia	11:48.92	Tiphanie Saint-Blancat; French Polynesia	12:02.40	Gabrielle Race; Northern Mariana Islands	12:33.12
2000 metres steeplechase	Georgia Winkcup; Australia	7:09.24	Bethany Croft; Australia	7:22.93	Ffion Muhl; New Zealand	8:00.07
100 metres hurdles (wind: +0.0 m/s)	Carlie Whitford; Australia	14.43	Michaela Emblem; Australia	14.51	Natalie Setiadji; Australia	14.73
400 metres hurdles	Carlie Whitford; Australia	64.76	Kristin Kalemusic; Australia	68.72	Chloe Botella (Northern Territory) / (Queensland) North Australia	74.71
High jump	Aprille Mincher; New Zealand	1.58m	Chloe Botella (Northern Territory) / (Queensland) North Australia	1.58m	Nahema Agussan; Tahiti West Coast	1.49m
Long jump	Kate Plimmer; New Zealand	5.34m (wind: -0.8 m/s)	Emma Hopcroft; New Zealand	5.07m (wind: +0.5 m/s)	Teiti Tupuna; Cook Islands	4.91m (wind: -0.1 m/s)
Triple jump	Aprille Mincher; New Zealand	10.90m (wind: +0.7 m/s)	Kate Plimmer; New Zealand	10.77m (wind: +0.0 m/s)	Emma Hopcroft; New Zealand	10.64m (wind: +1.2 m/s)
Shot put	Luisa Sekona; Australia	14.88m	Kamaia Peina; Australia	13.98m	Katie Smith; New Zealand	13.78m
Discus throw	Kirsty Williams; Australia	45.27m	Lauren Bruce; New Zealand	39.22m	Monica Dimon; Australia	37.82m
Hammer throw	Lauren Bruce; New Zealand	55.10m	Taylor Jade Minslow; Australia	49.01m	Emma Kruszona; New Zealand	48.32m
Javelin throw	Emilie Falelavaki /Wallis and Futuna	46.50m	Laura Overton; New Zealand	45.41m	Kamaia Peina; Australia	42.58m
5000 metre Walk	Jasmine Dighton; Australia	25:56.67	Tayla-Paige Billington; Australia	26:16.73		
4 x 100 metres relay	New Zealand; Christina Ashton; Sian Chapman; Mikaela Jefferson; Kate Plimmer	50.73	French Polynesia; Tea Boyer; Hinatea Pito; HerEani Manate; Taiana Mothe	52.69	Tahiti West Coast; Kahaia Dauphin; Lea Pouliquen; Nahema Agussan; Tahiona Doucet	53.39
4 x 400 metres relay	Australia; Kristin Kalemusic; Alina Tape; Isabella Smith; Bethany Croft	4:03.45	New Zealand; Mikaela Jefferson; Arianna Lord; Kate Plimmer; Jemima Tennekoon	4:09.40		

== Medal table (unofficial) ==
* Host nation (French Polynesia)

Rank	Nation	Gold	Silver	Bronze	Total
1	Australia	21	8	5	34
2	New Zealand	15	19	8	42
3	French Polynesia*	2	7	5	14
4	Solomon Islands	1	0	0	1
4	/Wallis and Futuna	1	0	0	1
6	Guam	0	2	1	3
7	(Northern Territory) / (Queensland) North Australia	0	1	2	3
8	Tahiti West Coast	0	0	3	3
9	Vanuatu	0	0	2	2
10	American Samoa	0	0	1	1
10	Cook Islands	0	0	1	1
10	Northern Mariana Islands	0	0	1	1
10	Tuvalu	0	0	1	1
Totals (13 entries)		40	37	30	107

== Participation (unofficial) ==
According to an unofficial count, 116 athletes from 17 countries participated. In addition to 14 OAA member and 1 associate member teams, there was a team from Wallis and Futuna, which is no OAA member, and two regional teams: A local team dubbed "Tahiti West Coast" (TWC in the result lists) and a "Regional Australia Team" (RAT in the result lists) including athletes with "their normal place of residence in Northern Australia (defined as comprising the Northern Territory and any parts of Western Australia and Queensland, north of 26th parallel south latitude)."

- American Samoa (3)
- Australia (23)
- Cook Islands (2)
- French Polynesia (16)
- Guam (2)
- Marshall Islands (1)
- New Caledonia (4)
- New Zealand (27)
- (Northern Territory) / (Queensland) North Australia (4)
- Northern Mariana Islands (1)
- Palau (2)
- Solomon Islands (1)
- Tahiti West Coast (23)
- Tonga (1)
- Tuvalu (1)
- Vanuatu (2)
- /Wallis and Futuna (3)
