= 2022 Oceania U20 Athletics Championships =

Sports competition in Mackay, Australia

- Organisers: Oceania Athletics
- Edition: 9th
- Dates: 7–11 June
- Host city: Mackay, Queensland
- Venue: Mackay Aquatic and Recreation Centre
- Level: Under 20
- Type: Outdoor
- Events: 46

The 2022 Oceania U20 Athletics Championships, also known colloquially by its former official title, the Oceania Junior Championships, was an international athletics competition for Oceania athletes qualifying as juniors (born no earlier than 1 January 2003), which was held from 7 to 11 June 2022 in Mackay, North Queensland, Australia. It marked the fifth time Australia had hosted the Championships.

The Championships were held concurrently with the Senior, U18, the inaugural Para Championships, and the U16 Team Challenge.

== Medal table ==
* Host nation (Australia)

Rank	Nation	Gold	Silver	Bronze	Total
1	Australia*	39	34	19	92
2	New Zealand	7	5	5	17
3	Guam	0	1	1	2
4	Papua New Guinea	0	1	0	1
5	Fiji	0	0	1	1
5	French Polynesia	0	0	1	1
5	Tonga	0	0	1	1
Totals (7 entries)		46	41	28	115

== Medal summary ==
=== Men ===
Event	Gold		Silver		Bronze		Ref
100 metres (−0.2 m/s)	Connor Bond; Australia	10.40	Calab Law; Australia	10.49	Ryan Tarrant; Australia	10.56	
200 metres (+2.1 m/s)	Connor Bond; Australia	21.22	Ryan Tarrant; Australia	21.28	Lachlan Kennedy; Australia	21.52	
400 metres	Timothy Sanki; Australia	48.95	Brodie Hicks; Australia	49.54	Gus Simpfendorfer; Australia	49.80	
800 metres	James Harding; New Zealand	1:53.80	Hayden Todd; Australia	1:55.59			
1500 metres	James Harding; New Zealand	3:59.73	Mitchel Langborne; Australia	3:59.80	Ethan Wyatt-Smith; Australia	4:00.02	
3000 metres	Will Anthony; New Zealand	8:20.37	Douglas Buckeridge; Australia	8:36.76	Hamish Hart; Australia	9:06.95	
5000 metres	Logan Janetzki; Australia	14:43.64	Rhys Hadfield; Australia	15:37.25	Hugh Kent; Guam	16:23.14	
110 metres hurdles (+2.3 m/s)	Mitchell Lightfoot; Australia	13.60	James Kotis; Australia	14.79	Nehumi Tuihalamaka; Tonga	16.09	
400 metres hurdles	Kyle Bennett; Australia	53.33	Thomas Byrne; Australia	56.26	Alex Gordon; Australia	58.95	
3000 metres steeplechase	Harvey Cramb; Australia	9:17.43	Alexander Kwa; Australia	9:18.11	Flynn Pumpa; Australia	9:25.93	
5000 metres walk	Raven Pyda; Australia	25:06.39	Riley Whatman; Australia	25:54.44			
10,000 metres walk	Riley Whatman; Australia	52:43.40	Raven Pyda; Australia	53:19.15			
4 × 100 metres relay	Australia (AUS); Toshi Butlin; Connor Bond; Lachlan Kennedy; Calab Law	40.05					
4 × 400 metres relay	Australia (AUS); Thomas Byrne; Gus Simpfendorfer; Timothy Sanki; Brodie Hicks	3:22.41	Guam (GUM); Jovan Pineda; Hugh Kent; Isaac Valdez; Mark Imazu	3:46.92			
High jump	Adam Stack; New Zealand	2.07 m	Lochlan Curry; Australia	2.05 m			
Pole vault	Liam Georgilopoulos; Australia	4.90 m	Andrew Bull; Australia	4.10 m			
Long jump	Blake Shaw; Australia	7.29 m (+2.6 m/s)	Angus Lyver; New Zealand	7.07 m (+2.4 m/s)	Waisele Inoke; Fiji	7.06 m (+3.2 m/s)	
Triple jump	Jay Louison-Roe; Australia	15.02 m (+2.1 m/s)	Kipchumba Langat; Australia	14.51 m (+1.8 m/s)	Teaiki Lenoir; French Polynesia	14.01 m (+2.5 m/s)	
Shot put	Liam Ngchok-Wulf; New Zealand	17.37 m	Jason Parmaxidis; Australia	17.26 m	Angus Alberts; Australia	17.25 m	
Discus throw	Darcy Miller; Australia	56.16 m	Bryce Nolan; Australia	55.05 m	Etienne Rousseau; Australia	55.02 m	
Javelin throw	Haddi El Shorbagy; Australia	67.00 m	Jack Greaves; Australia	60.64 m			
Hammer throw	Damien Wells; Australia	65.47 m	Ben Roberts; Australia	64.13 m	Will Higgins; Australia	57.32 m	
Decathlon	Noah Oliver; Australia	7082 pts	Will Jarman; Australia	6323 pts	Connor Duggan; Australia	5752 pts	
WR world record | AR area record | CR championship record | GR games record | NR national record | OR Olympic record | PB personal best | SB season best | WL world leading (in a given season)

=== Women ===
Event	Gold		Silver		Bronze		Ref
100 metres (+0.5 m/s)	Hayley Reynolds; Australia		Olivia Inkster; Australia		Nadia Evans; New Zealand		
200 metres (+1.5 m/s)	Hayley Reynolds; Australia	24.30	Olivia Inkster; Australia	24.32	Nadia Evans; New Zealand	25.23	
400 metres	Txai Anglin; Australia	55.67					
800 metres	Hayley Kitching; Australia	2:08.25	Emma Ferguson; New Zealand	2:14.85	Sayla Donnelley; Australia	2:16.88	
1500 metres	Hayley Kitching; Australia	4:19.47	Nicola Hogg; Australia	4:22.25	Emma Ferguson; New Zealand	4:43.01	
3000 metres	Nicola Hogg; Australia	9:30.62	Hannah Gapes; New Zealand	9:40.57			
5000 metres	Hannah Anderson; Australia	17:36.03	Scholastica Herman; Papua New Guinea	19:22.70			
100 metres hurdles (+0.9 m/s)	Emelia Surch; Australia	13.75	Georgia Fichardt; Australia	14.67	Julia Burnham; New Zealand	14.80	
400 metres hurdles	Isabella Guthrie; Australia	59.63	Ashley Spencer; Australia	1:02.71	Paige Elvey; Australia	1:03.73	
3000 metres steeplechase	Abbie Butler; Australia	10:52.97	Abigail Thomas; Australia	11:01.58			
5000 metres walk	Elizabeth McMillen; Australia	24:02.11					
10,000 metres walk	Olivia Sandery; Australia	47:11.36	Elizabeth McMillen; Australia	48:56.07			
4 × 100 metres relay	Australia (AUS); Georgia Fichardt; Hayley Reynolds; Olivia Inkster; Siena Farrell	46.60					
4 × 400 metres relay	Australia (AUS); Paige Elvey; Txai Anglin; Sayla Donnelley; Isabella Guthrie	3:46.06					
High jump	Alexandra Harrison; Australia	1.82 m	Toby Stolberg; Australia	1.78 m	Sophie Lillicrap; Australia	1.70 m	
Pole vault	Georgia Tayler; Australia	3.50 m	Hannah Adye; New Zealand	3.40 m			
Long jump	Emelia Surch; Australia	6.02 m (+1.3 m/s)	Alyssa Lowe; Australia	6.00 m (+1.8 m/s)	Katie Gunn; Australia	5.90 m (+1.3 m/s)	
Triple jump	Tiana Boras; Australia	12.78 m (±0.0 m/s)	Zoe Edwards; Australia	12.33 m (+0.3 m/s)	Alexandra York; Australia	12.02 m (±0.0 m/s)	
Shot put	Natalia Rankin-Chitar; New Zealand	14.37 m	Kaitlyn Coulter; Australia	13.40 m	Tahlee Ferguson; Australia	12.90 m	
Discus throw	Natalia Rankin-Chitar; New Zealand	49.33 m	Ashlyn Blackstock; Australia	46.62 m	Laylani Va'ai; Australia	46.25 m	
Javelin throw	Mackenzie Mielczarek; Australia	54.64 m	Abbey Moody; New Zealand	50.42 m	Angelina Tignani; Australia	48.01 m	
Hammer throw	Lara Roberts; Australia	54.35	Renee Hardy; Australia	52.69	Elizabeth Hewitt; New Zealand	48.35	
Heptathlon	Mia Scerri; Australia	5480 pts	Hannah Tait; Australia	3529 pts			
WR world record | AR area record | CR championship record | GR games record | NR national record | OR Olympic record | PB personal best | SB season best | WL world leading (in a given season)

== Participating nations ==
Eight member federations participated. Regional Australia were an invitational team and were ineligible for Championship medals.

- Australia (109) (Host)
  - (Northern Territory) / (Queensland) Regional Australia
- Cook Islands (2)
- Fiji (1)
- French Polynesia (2)
- Guam (4)
- New Zealand
- Papua New Guinea (2)
- Tonga (1)
