= Faresa Kapisi =

American Samoan sprinter

Personal information
- Nationality: American Samoan
- Born: 23 July 1997 (age 28)

Sport
- Sport: Track and field
- Event: 100m

Faresa Kapisi (born 23 July 1997) is an American Samoan sprinter. He competed in the 100 metres event at the 2013 World Championships in Athletics as barely a 16-year-old.

== Personal bests ==
Event	Result	Venue	Date
Outdoor
100 m	11.21 s (wind: -0.4 m/s)	(Russia) Moscow	10 August 2013
200 m	22.43 s (wind: +0.2 m/s)	(Australia) Sydney	13 March 2014
Indoor
60 m	7.14 s	(Poland) Sopot	7 March 2014

== Competition record ==
Year	Competition	Venue	Position	Event	Notes
Representing American Samoa
2013	Oceania Youth Championships	Papeete, French Polynesia	5th	100m	11.47 (wind: -0.4 m/s)
2013	Oceania Youth Championships	Papeete, French Polynesia	3rd	200m	23.51 (wind: -1.5 m/s)
2013	World Championships	Moscow, Russia	64th (pr)	100m	11.21 (wind: -0.4 m/s)
2014	World Indoor Championships	Sopot, Poland	38th (h)	60m	7.14
2014	Oceania Junior Championships	Rarotonga, Cook Islands	—	100m	DNF
2014	World Junior Championships	Eugene, Oregon, United States	42nd (h)	100m	11.66 (wind: +1.4 m/s)
2014	Youth Olympic Games	Nanjing, China	30th (h)	100m	12.03 (wind: -0.5 m/s)
