= Dallas Roberts (athlete) =

New Zealand sprinter

Personal information
- Nationality: New Zealand
- Born: 23 August 1979 (age 46) Timaru, Canterbury

Sport
- Sport: Athletics
Medal record
Men's athletics
Representing New Zealand
Oceania Junior Championships
Silver medal – second place	1996 Townsville	100 m
Silver medal – second place	1996 Townsville	200 m
- Updated on 19 April 2013

Dallas Roberts (born 23 August 1979 in Timaru) is a retired New Zealand sprinter.

He finished ninth in the 200 metres in the 2002 IAAF World Cup, and competed at the 2002 Commonwealth Games where he finished 8th in the second semifinal of the men's 200 metres.

He has 20.79 seconds in the 200 metres, achieved in June 2002 in Bern; and 10.46 seconds in the 100 metres, achieved in June 2002 in Luzern.

== Achievements ==
Year	Competition	Venue	Position	Event	Notes
Representing New Zealand
1996	Oceania Junior Championships	Townsville, Australia	2nd	100 m	10.85 s (wind: +0.9 m/s)
1996	Oceania Junior Championships	Townsville, Australia	2nd	200 m	21.70 s w (wind: +3.2 m/s)
1998	World Junior Championships	Annecy, France	15th (qf)	200m	21.40 (wind: -0.9 m/s)
1998	World Junior Championships	Annecy, France	—	4 × 100 m relay	DNF
1998	World Junior Championships	Annecy, France	11th (h)	4 × 400 m relay	3:14.77
