= 2014 Oceania Junior Athletics Championships =

VI Oceania Junior Athletics Championships
- Dates: June 24–26
- Host city: Avarua, Rarotonga, Cook Islands
- Venue: BCI Stadium
- Level: Junior
- Events: 41 (20 men, 21 women)
- Participation: 140 athletes from 21 nations

The 2014 Oceania Junior Athletics Championships were held at the BCI Stadium in Avarua, Rarotonga, Cook Islands, between June 24–26, 2014. They were held together with the 2014 Oceania Senior Championships, and there were also exhibition events for masters, and athletes with a disability (parasports). Detailed reports on a day by day basis were given.

In the junior category, a total of 41 events were contested, 20 by men and 21 by women.

== Medal summary ==
Complete results can be found on the Oceania Athletics Association webpage.

=== Boys (U20) ===
Event	Gold		Silver		Bronze	
100 metres (wind: +2.2 m/s)	Nicholas Bate; Australia	10.65 w	Peauope Suli Fifita; Tonga	10.77 w	Apolosi Ratumudu; Fiji	10.77 w
200 metres (wind: +1.7 m/s)	Nicholas Bate; Australia	21.41 CR	Batinisavu Uluiyata; Fiji	21.86	Sean J. Fitzsimmons; Australia	21.87
400 metres	Batinisavu Uluiyata; Fiji	47.67 CR	Sean J. Fitzsimmons; Australia	48.14	Kaminiel Matlaun; Papua New Guinea	48.18
800 metres	Alec Arnold; Australia	1:55.61	Theunis Pieters; New Zealand	1:56.75	Joshua Kentwell; Australia	1:59.67
1500 metres	Alec Arnold; Australia	4:11.56	Joshua Kentwell; Australia	4:11.87	John Aquino; Guam	4:14.76
5000 metres	John Aquino; Guam	16:01.79	Matthew Dryden; New Zealand	16:09.44	Rosfelo Siosi; Solomon Islands	16:14.63
10000 metres	Matthew Dryden; New Zealand	34:02.75 CR	Rosfelo Siosi; Solomon Islands	34:52.47	Derickson Antibas; Marshall Islands	41:31.44
3000 metres steeplechase	Loïc Mevel; French Polynesia	10:29.55	Louis Ligerot; French Polynesia	10:31.51		
110 metres hurdles (wind: -1.8 m/s)	Namataiki Tevenino; French Polynesia	15.15	Jordan Mills; Australia	15.20	Johnny Quitigua; Guam	16.55
400 metres hurdles	Matthew Crowe; Australia	54.91	Robert Broadhead; Australia	56.26	Peniel Joshua; Papua New Guinea	57.14
High jump	Cedric Dubler; Australia HPTC	2.09m	Jason Strano; Australia	2.00m	James Jeffrey; Australia	1.97m
Long jump	Nicholas van Gelder; Australia	7.21m (wind: -1.0 m/s) CR	Waisale Dausoko; Fiji	6.94m (wind: +0.0 m/s)	Charles Rosas (Northern Territory) / (Queensland) North Australia	6.17m (wind: -0.8 m/s)
Triple jump	Charles Rosas (Northern Territory) / (Queensland) North Australia	14.03m (wind: +0.7 m/s)	Johnny Quitigua; Guam	12.50m (wind: +1.3 m/s)	Makalea Foliaki; French Polynesia	12.45m (wind: +1.9 m/s)
Shot put	Brody James; Australia	14.62m	Jinnam Hopotoa; Niue	13.97m	Denzelle To'o; Cook Islands	13.64m
Discus throw	Brody James; Australia	47.40m	Hamish Dewar; New Zealand	44.03m	Denzelle To'o; Cook Islands	43.71m
Hammer throw	Tom Quinn; New Zealand	55.16m	Bradley Herbert; Australia	46.91m	Jack Bannister (Northern Territory) / (Queensland) North Australia	39.44m
Javelin throw	Ikipa Misikea; Niue	45.79m	William Pasisi; Niue	42.98m	Pedro Aquiningoc; Guam	40.86m
Octathlon	Max Attwell; New Zealand	5282	Lachlan Calvert; Australia	5149	Hamish Dewar; New Zealand	4551
4 x 100 metres relay	Australia; Sean J. Fitzsimmons; Nicholas Bate; Vandy Kanneh; Rene Zacchini	42.64	Niue; Roynuka Nukanuka; William Pasisi; Jinnam Hopotoa; Ikipa Misikea	47.10	(Northern Territory) / (Queensland) North Australia; Charles Rosas; Jack Bannister; Travis Andison; Khyle Tucker	47.35
4 x 400 metres relay	Australia; Rene Zacchini; Matthew Crowe; Robert Broadhead; Sean J. Fitzsimmons	3:22.72 CR	New Zealand; Dhruv Raman; Theunis Pieters; Max Attwell; Alexander Howden	3:27.05	Guam; Johnny Quitigua; John Aquino; Pedro Aquiningoc; Bleu Perez	3:48.70

=== Girls (U20) ===
Event	Gold		Silver		Bronze	
100 metres (wind: +1.8 m/s)	Georgia Hulls; New Zealand	12.20 CR	Caitlyn George; New Zealand	12.28	Caitlin Newson; Australia	12.49
200 metres (wind: -0.2 m/s)	Georgia Hulls; New Zealand	24.88 CR	Caitlyn George; New Zealand	25.26	Regine Tugade; Guam	25.52
400 metres	Grace Victor; Australia	55.99	Jessica Haig; Australia	56.44	Maddy Scott; Australia	56.56
800 metres	Holly Manning; New Zealand	2:11.17 CR	Grace Victor; Australia	2:13.92	Isabella Smith; Australia	2:14.78
1500 metres	Georgia Winkcup; Australia	4:29.97 CR	Isabella Smith; Australia	4:37.78	Arianna Lord; New Zealand	4:38.97
5000 metres	Chloé Andres; French Polynesia	20:20.02	Genina Criss; Guam	21:49.27		
10000 metres	Libby Jacques; Australia	37:54.18	Jayde Hill; Australia	40:06.92	Chloé Andres; French Polynesia	42:12.93
3000 metres steeplechase	Georgia Winkcup; Australia	10:37.91 CR				
100 metres hurdles (wind: +0.1 m/s)	Natalie Setiadji; Australia	15.01	Jacinta Fisher; Australia	15.35		
400 metres hurdles	Kasey Moore; Australia	64.86	Raylyne Kanam; Papua New Guinea	66.26	Emily-Claire Bass (Northern Territory) / (Queensland) North Australia	66.31
High jump	Anna Staib; Australia	1.63m	Rosie Elliott; New Zealand	1.63m	Nahema Agussan; French Polynesia	1.45m
Long jump	Tea Boyer; French Polynesia	4.98m w (wind: +2.4 m/s)	Brooke Somerfield; New Zealand	4.97m (wind: +1.8 m/s)	Shannon Reynolds (Northern Territory) / (Queensland) North Australia	4.91m w (wind: +3.5 m/s)
Triple jump	Anna Thomson; New Zealand	11.66m (wind: +0.0 m/s)	Jacinta Fisher; Australia	11.60m w (wind: +3.3 m/s)	Atipa Mabonga; New Zealand	11.50m (wind: +0.5 m/s)
Shot put	'Ata Maama Tu'utafaiva; Tonga	13.39m	Brianna Bortolanza; Australia	12.53m	Maddy Bergfield; Australia	12.04m
Discus throw	Phoebe Sloane; Australia	43.43m	Maddy Bergfield; Australia	41.30m	Stephanie Wadsworth; Australia	37.92m
Hammer throw	Laura Herbert; Australia	53.29m	Brianna Smith (Northern Territory) / (Queensland) North Australia	45.25m	Shanen Layden (Northern Territory) / (Queensland) North Australia	44.00m
Javelin throw	Adrine Monagi; Papua New Guinea	38.26m	Kimberley Bright-Mync (Northern Territory) / (Queensland) North Australia	35.91m	Tatiana Sherwin; Cook Islands	26.89m
Heptathlon	Christie Molloy; Australia	4242	Adrine Monagi; Papua New Guinea	4226	Rachel Gould (Northern Territory) / (Queensland) North Australia	3636
5000 metres track walk	Jayde Hill; Australia	24:55.14	Stephanie Grujoski; Australia	28:21.61		
4 x 100 metres relay	New Zealand; Caitlyn George; Brooke Somerfield; Rosie Elliott; Georgia Hulls	49.44	Australia; Natalie Setiadji; Caitlin Newson; Jacinta Fisher; Grace Victor	49.58	(Northern Territory) / (Queensland) North Australia; Shannon Reynolds; Emily-Claire Bass; Kayla Horne; Rita Fontaine	50.58
4 x 400 metres relay	Australia; Maddy Scott; Jessica Haig; Kasey Moore; Grace Victor	3:54.91 CR	New Zealand; Caitlyn George; Arianna Lord; Holly Manning; Georgia Hulls	4:04.59	(Northern Territory) / (Queensland) North Australia; Rita Fontaine; Shannon Reynolds; Rachel Gould; Emily-Claire Bass	4:11.85

== Medal table (unofficial) ==
* Host nation (Cook Islands)

Rank	Nation	Gold	Silver	Bronze	Total
1	Australia	22	17	8	47
2	New Zealand	8	9	3	20
3	French Polynesia	4	1	3	8
4	Niue	1	3	0	4
5	(Northern Territory) / (Queensland) North Australia	1	2	9	12
6	Guam	1	2	5	8
7	Papua New Guinea	1	2	2	5
8	Fiji	1	2	1	4
9	Tonga	1	1	0	2
10	Australia HPTC	1	0	0	1
11	Solomon Islands	0	1	1	2
12	Cook Islands*	0	0	3	3
13	Marshall Islands	0	0	1	1
Totals (13 entries)		41	40	36	117

== Participation ==
According to an unofficial count, 140 athletes from 21 countries participated. As in the years before, there was also a "Regional Australia Team" (dubbed "RAT" in the results list) recruited by Athletics North Queensland and Athletics Northern Territory. Moreover, there was an athlete (Australian Cedric Dubler) representing the IAAF High-Performance Training Centre (HPTC) in Varsity Lakes, Queensland, Australia. Some athletes competed in both the junior and the senior category.

- American Samoa (2)
- Australia (36)
- Australia HPTC (1)
- Cook Islands (16)
- Fiji (3)
- French Polynesia (9)
- Guam (8)
- Kiribati (2)
- Marshall Islands (4)
- Nauru (1)
- New Caledonia (3)
- New Zealand (15)
- Niue (4)
- Norfolk Island (1)
- (Northern Territory) / (Queensland) North Australia (16)
- Northern Mariana Islands (2)
- Palau (2)
- Papua New Guinea (6)
- Solomon Islands (2)
- Tonga (3)
- Vanuatu (4)
