= Rob Elder =

Fijian archer (born 1981)

Personal information
- Nationality: Fijian
- Born: 25 April 1981 (age 45) Suva
- Height: 1.93 m (6 ft 4 in)
- Weight: 115 kg (254 lb)

Sport
- Country: Fiji
- Sport: Archery
- Event: Men's individual
Medal record
Representing Fiji
Men's Archery
Pacific Games
Silver medal – second place	2007 Apia	Individual Recurve
Silver medal – second place	2011 Nouméa	Individual Recurve
Men's Athletics
Oceania Championships
Silver medal – second place	1998 Nukuʻalofa	High jump
Oceania Junior Championships
Silver medal – second place	1998 Nukuʻalofa	High jump
Oceania Youth Championships
Gold medal – first place	1997 Suva	High jump
- Updated on 19 April 2013

Rob Elder (born 25 April 1981 in Suva) is an athlete from Fiji. He competes in archery.

Elder competed at the 2004 Summer Olympics in men's individual archery. He was defeated in the first round of elimination, placing 48th overall. He also qualified for the 2012 Summer Olympics in the men's individual archery, coming 63 in the ranking round, before almost pulling off a shock comeback over Korean Kim Bub-min (who had earlier won a bronze in the team event). After being 4-0 down, before losing 6–4 in the deciding set in the 1/32 elimination round, needing to shoot 10 for victory, he could only manage a 6.

== Achievements in other sports ==
In his early years, he was also competing successfully in athletics.

Year	Competition	Venue	Position	Event	Notes
Representing Fiji
1997	Oceania Youth Championships	Suva, Fiji	1st	High jump	1.93 m
1998	Oceania Junior Championships	Nukuʻalofa, Tonga	2nd	High jump	1.95 m
1998	Oceania Championships	Nukuʻalofa, Tonga	2nd	High jump	1.95 m
