= Connor Bond =

Australian sprinter (born 2003)

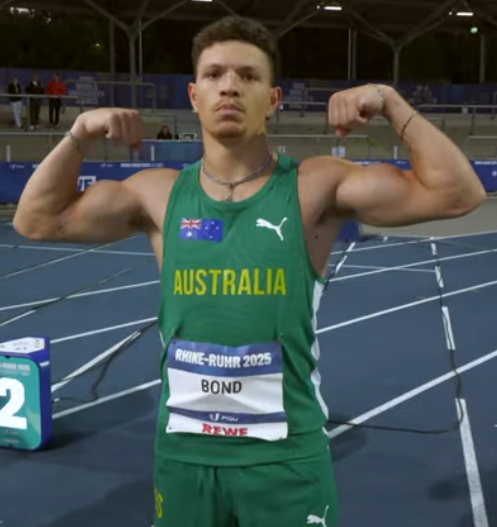
- At the 2025 Summer World University Games

Personal information
- Nationality: Australian
- Born: 2 June 2003 (age 23)

Sport
- Sport: Track and Field
- Events: 100m, 200m

Achievements and titles
- Personal bests: 60m: 6.65 (Canberra, 2026); 100m: 10.18 (Perth, 2026); 200m: 20.74 (Brisbane, 2023)

Connor Bond (born 2 June 2003) is an Australian sprinter.

== Career ==
From New South Wales, Bond was a gold medalist as a 19 year-old at the Oceania U20 Athletics Championships in Oceania U20 Athletics Championships in Mackay, Queensland in 2022.

Bond was a member of the Australian team in the Mixed 4 × 100 m relay at the 2025 World Athletics Relays which qualified for the final on the first day of the competition. He then ran in the final as the Australia team went on to finish in fourth place overall in the event.

Bond was selected for the 2025 Summer World University Games in Bochum, Germany, qualifying for the final of the 100 metres and placing seventh overall. He also placed fourth in the final of the men’s 4 x 100 metres at the Games. In September 2025, he competed in the men's 4 x 100 metres at the 2025 World Championships in Tokyo, Japan, as the Australian team placed eighth.

Bond ran a personal best for the 100 metres at the Perth Track Classic on 14 February 2026, with a time of 10.18 (+1.9). On 11 April 2026, he was a finalist over 100 metres at the 2026 Australian Athletics Championships, placing fourth overall in 10.33 seconds (+0.5 m/s). He was selected for the Australian team to compete at the 2026 World Athletics Relays in Gaborone, Botswana.

== Personal life ==
His father, Greame Bond, and his uncle Adam Ashley-Cooper, were both rugby union internationals for Australia.
