= Glenn Howard (athlete) =

New Zealand high jumper

Personal information
- Full name: Glenn Anthony Bruce Howard
- Nickname: Howie
- Nationality: New Zealand
- Born: 13 April 1976 (age 50) Christchurch, Canterbury
- Height: 195 cm (6 ft 5 in)
- Weight: 84 kg (185 lb)

Sport
- Sport: Athletics
Medal record
Men's athletics
Representing New Zealand
Oceania Junior Championships
| Gold medal – first place | 1994 Auckland | High jump |
- Updated on 14 June 2015

Glenn Anthony Bruce Howard (born 13 April 1976) is a male high jumper from New Zealand. He competed at the 2000 Summer Olympics where he finished tied for 27th place.

== Personal bests ==
| Event | Height | Place | Date |
|---|---|---|---|
| High Jump | 2.30m NR | Christchurch | 2000 |

== International competitions ==
| Year | Competition | Venue | Position | Event | Notes |
Representing New Zealand
| 1994 | Oceania Junior Championships | Auckland, New Zealand | 1st | High jump | 2.15 m |
| 1994 | World Junior Championships | Lisbon, Portugal | 20th (q) | High jump | 2.05 m |
| 2000 | Olympic Games | Sydney, Australia | 27th (q) | High jump | 2.15 m |
