= Namataiki Tevenino =

French Polynesian athlete (born 1996)

Personal information
- Born: 20 June 1996 (age 29)

Sport
- Sport: Athletics
- Event(s): 110 m hurdles, 60 m hurdles

Namataiki Tevenino (born 20 June 1996) is a French Polynesian athlete specialising in the sprint hurdles. He represented his country at the 2016 and 2018 World Indoor Championships without advancing from the first round on both occasions.

His personal bests are 15.41 seconds in the 110 metres hurdles (+1.1 m/s, Toulouse 2017) and 8.53 seconds in the 60 metres hurdles (Aubiére 2016).

== International competitions ==
Year	Competition	Venue	Position	Event	Notes
Representing French Polynesia
2013	Oceania Youth Championships	Papeete, French Polynesia	4th	100 m	11.45
2013	Oceania Youth Championships	Papeete, French Polynesia	2nd	200 m	23.41
2013	Oceania Youth Championships	Papeete, French Polynesia	6th	400 m	53.60
2013	Oceania Youth Championships	Papeete, French Polynesia	4th	Long jump	5.99 m
2013	World Youth Championships	Donetsk, Ukraine	74th (h)	100 m	11.58
2014	Oceania Junior Championships	Avarua, Cook Islands	1st	110 m hurdles (99.0 cm)	15.15
2014	World Junior Championships	Eugene, United States	53rd (h)	110 m hurdles (99.0 cm)	15.08
2015	Pacific Games	Port Moresby, Papua New Guinea	4th	110 m hurdles	16:13
2016	World Indoor Championships	Portland, United States	27th (h)	60 m hurdles	8.84
2018	World Indoor Championships	Birmingham, United Kingdom	37th (h)	60 m hurdles	8.98
