= Oceania Para Athletics Championships =

Athletics event

- Status: active
- Genre: sports event
- Frequency: biennial
- Location: various
- Inaugurated: 2022
- Most recent: 2024
- Next event: 2026
- Organiser: Oceania Athletics Association
- Website: athletics-oceania.com

The Oceania Para Athletics Championships is an event organized by Oceania Athletics Association (OAA) and the Oceania Paralympic Committee (OPC) for athletes with disabilities from the Oceania region. As of 2026, the Championships are officially sanctioned by World Para Athletics.

The event is one of the first regional World Athletics Para meet after the European Para Athletics Championships.

== History ==
Historically, para events were offered as exhibition events as part of the Oceania Athletics Championships (for senior able-bodied athletes) from 2014 to 2019. Since 2020, the impacts caused by the COVID-19 pandemic resulted in the cancellation of the Area Championships in 2021 and the World Para Athletics Championships in 2022. This saw limited International Competition for Para Athletes throughout Oceania. Hence, in March 2022, the need for quality competition for the Oceania para-athletes was recognised by both OAA and the OPC, which culminated the inaugural Para Championships in 2022.

== Classification ==
All athletes are classified according to their impairment. Each classification consists of a three character code, starting with a letter and followed by a two-digit number. The letter specifies the event type: T for track and jumping events, and F for throwing events. The first digit of the number specifies the type of impairment and the second digit the severity of the impairment; the lower the second number, the more impaired.

- T/F11–13 (visual impairment)
- T/F20 (intellectual impairment)
- T/F31–34 (wheelchair events for athletes with a movement disorder, including cerebral palsy)
- T/F35–38 (ambulant events for athletes with a movement disorder, including cerebral palsy)
- T/F40–41 (short stature, including dwarfism)
- T/F42–44 (leg impairment, lower limb affected by limb deficiency, leg length difference, impaired muscle power or impaired range of movement)
- T/F45–47 (arm impairment, upper limbs affected by limb deficiency, impaired muscle power or impaired range of movement)
- T/F51–57 (wheelchair events for athletes with a lower body impairment, including paraplegia)
- T/F61-64 (Lower limb/s competing with prosthesis affected by limb deficiency and leg length difference)

=== Competition ===
At the Oceania Championships, athletes of multiple different classifications compete against each other in two main categorial events, ambulant and wheelchair/secured events. Hence, placings and medals are awarded using the Raza point score system (or an approved MDS table) in order to compare times, throws or jumps by athletes of differing levels of disability. The performances are converted to point scores by a formula which accounts for the athletes' classifications.

== Editions ==
Edition	Year	City	Country	Date	Venue	No. of Events	No. of Athletes	Best Nation
1	2022	Mackay	Australia	7 – 11 June	Mackay Aquatic and Recreation Centre	26		Australia
2	2024	Suva	Fiji	4 – 8 June	HFC Bank Stadium	22		Australia
3	2026	Darwin	Australia	18 – 23 May	Arafura Stadium	34	TBC	TBD
4	2028	TBA						

== Medal table (2022–2024) ==
Rank	Nation	Gold	Silver	Bronze	Total
1	Australia	25	14	12	51
–	Queensland	7	3	3	13
2	New Zealand	5	9	4	18
3	Papua New Guinea	2	3	2	7
4	Fiji	2	2	5	9
–	New South Wales	2	1	2	5
5	Vanuatu	2	1	0	3
–	South Australia	2	1	0	3
–	Australian Capital Territory	1	0	1	2
–	Victoria	0	2	0	2
6	Solomon Islands	0	1	2	3
–	Northern Territory	0	0	1	1
–	Western Australia	0	0	1	1
Totals (6 entries)		48	37	33	118

== See also ==
- World Para Athletics Championships
- Oceania Athletics Championships
- 2016 Asian Para Athletics Championships
