= 1994 Oceania Junior Athletics Championships =

I Oceania Junior Athletics Championships
- Dates: February 23–26
- Host city: Auckland, New Zealand
- Level: Junior
- Events: 34 (18 men, 16 women)
- Participation: 143 athletes from 16 nations

The 1994 Oceania Junior Athletics Championships were held in Auckland, New Zealand, between February 23–26, 1994. They were held together with the 1994 Oceania Open Championships. A total of 34 events were contested, 18 by men and 16 by women.

== Medal summary ==
Complete results can be found as compiled by Bob Snow on the Athletics Papua New Guinea, on the Athletics Weekly, and on the World Junior Athletics History webpages.

=== Boys under 20 (Junior) ===
Event	Gold		Silver		Bronze	
100 metres (wind: -2.1 m/s)	Dean Wise (NZL)	10.94	Matthew Coad (NZL)	10.95	Amania Seru (FIJ)	11.17
200 metres (wind: 2.1 m/s)	Matthew Coad (NZL)	21.56 w	Dean Wise (NZL)	21.77 w	Amania Seru (FIJ)	22.28 w
400 metres	Robert Brown (AUS)	49.05	Chris Tooley (NZL)	49.97	Kris Sievers (AUS)	50.46
800 metres	Nick Burrow (NZL)	1:55.46	Andrew Ward (AUS)	1:55.80	Darren McVean (AUS)	1:55.94
1500 metres	Nick Burrow (NZL)	4:02.09	Kristian Woolf (AUS)	4:08.17	Clayton Pressley (AUS)	4:10.86
5000 metres	Duncan Ross (NZL)	14:51.31	Shiraaz Haroon Shah (FIJ)	16:20.17	Isireli Naikelekelevesi (FIJ)	16:42.35
110 metres hurdles (wind: 2.5 m/s)	Liam Whaley (NZL)	14.84 w	Joseph Rodan (FIJ)	15.71 w		
400 metres hurdles	Zion Armstrong (NZL)	53.69	Liam Whaley (NZL)	54.65	Daniel Kaputin (PNG)	55.95
High jump	Glenn Howard (NZL)	2.15	Dwayne Geddes (NZL)	2.00	Tariq Khan (FIJ)	1.88
Pole vault	Alani Hakalo (TGA)	3.80	Scott Vinson (AUS)	2.35		
Long jump	Paul Di Bella (AUS)	7.10 w (wind: 3.8 m/s)	Dean Wise (NZL)	6.95 (wind: 1.6 m/s)	Farooq Dean (FIJ)	6.94 (wind: 1.7 m/s)
Triple jump	Driss Doukari (AUS)	14.01 (wind: 1.7 m/s)	David Wilson (GUM)	13.58 (wind: 1.3 m/s)	Mark Ramby (NZL)	13.21 (wind: 1.7 m/s)
Shot put	Rodney Hogg (NZL)	13.20	Raphaël Tini (NCL)	11.82	Jone Cavubati (FIJ)	11.04
Discus throw	Luke Johnson (NZL)	44.80	Victor Sako (NCL)	37.84	Charles Winchester (COK)	34.96
Hammer throw	Glen Maher (NZL)	45.70	Victor Sako (NCL)	28.52		
Javelin Throw	Steven Madeo (AUS)	62.76	Andrew Harrison (NZL)	58.26	Scott Vinson (AUS)	56.40
4 x 100 metres relay	New Zealand	42.07	Australia	42.56	Fiji	42.76
4 x 400 metres relay	New Zealand	3:16.02	Australia	3:19.40	Papua New Guinea	3:25.90

=== Girls under 20 (Junior) ===
Event	Gold		Silver		Bronze	
100 metres (wind: -2.5 m/s)	Rachel Rogers (FIJ)	12.58	Adi Waqanitoga (FIJ)	12.63	Jodi Eastaughffe (AUS)	12.65
200 metres (wind: 2.5 m/s)	Rachel Rogers (FIJ)	25.03 w	Renee Robson (AUS)	25.15 w	Kelera Nacewa (FIJ)	25.36 w
400 metres	Renee Robson (AUS)	57.01	Shari Barrymore (NZL)	57.25	Sisilia Dauniwe (FIJ)	58.25
800 metres	Monique Ogilvie (NZL)	2:15.29	Sisilia Dauniwe (FIJ)	2:18.20	Ilisapeci Ligalau (FIJ)	2:19.27
1500 metres	Carina Hopkins (NZL)	4:33.04	Monique Ogilvie (NZL)	4:40.87	Katalaina Tinaitadrua (FIJ)	4:56.56
3000 metres	Kate Inwood (NZL)	10:10.43	Rebecca Rider (AUS)	10:45.02	Ekari Raika (FIJ)	10:53.97
100 metres hurdles (wind: 2.1 m/s)	Rachel Rogers (FIJ)	14.64 w	Ruth Chaney (NZL)	15.23 w	Elaine Glen (AUS)	15.47 w
400 metres hurdles	Nicola Kidd (NZL)	63.92	Elaine Ashbridge (NZL)	66.02	Asenaca Shaw (FIJ)	69.09
High jump	Carmen Hunter (AUS)	1.80	Belinda Lavarack (AUS)	1.77	Nadia Smith (NZL)	1.71
Long jump	Nadia Smith (NZL)	5.98 (wind: 1.5 m/s)	Marica Likulawedua (FIJ)	5.65 w (wind: 2.7 m/s)	Kelera Nacewa (FIJ)	5.50 w (wind: 2.7 m/s)
Triple jump	Elaine Glen (AUS)	11.33 w (wind: 4.3 m/s)	Natalie Brown (AUS)	11.14 w (wind: 3.5 m/s)	Marica Likulawedua (FIJ)	10.77 (wind: 1.7 m/s)
Shot put	(French Polynesia) /Margareth Bringold (TAH)	12.62	Marie-Chanelle Sako (NCL)	12.55	Sera Cawanibuka (FIJ)	11.77
Discus throw	Fleurette Bartley (NZL)	43.02	Kelly Ihaka (NZL)	42.62	(French Polynesia) /Margareth Bringold (TAH)	40.46
Javelin Throw	Bina Ramesh (NCL)	47.38	Kim Blackwood (NZL)	44.38	Linda Polelei (NCL)	42.34
4 x 100 metres relay	New Zealand	48.42	Fiji	48.77	Niue	53.10
4 x 400 metres relay	New Zealand	3:57.49	Fiji	3:59.23	Australia	4:06.01

== Medal table (unofficial) ==
* Host nation (New Zealand)

Rank	Nation	Gold	Silver	Bronze	Total
1	New Zealand (NZL)*	21	13	2	36
2	Australia (AUS)	7	9	7	23
3	Fiji (FIJ)	3	7	16	26
4	New Caledonia (NCL)	1	4	1	6
5	French Polynesia (TAH)	1	0	1	2
6	Tonga (TON)	1	0	0	1
7	Guam (GUM)	0	1	0	1
8	Papua New Guinea (PNG)	0	0	2	2
9	Cook Islands (COK)	0	0	1	1
9	Niue (NIU)	0	0	1	1
Totals (10 entries)		34	34	31	99

== Participation (unofficial) ==
An unofficial count yields the number of about 143 athletes from 16 countries:

- American Samoa (5)
- Australia (25)
- Cook Islands (5)
- Fiji (24)
- Guam (6)
- Nauru (2)
- New Caledonia (6)
- New Zealand (29)
- Niue (7)
- Northern Mariana Islands (4)
- Papua New Guinea (9)
- Samoa (1)
- Solomon Islands (19)
- (French Polynesia) /Tahiti (8)
- Tonga (1)
- Vanuatu (1)
