= 2022 Oceania Para Athletics Championships =

Paralympic track and field event

- Host city: Mackay, Australia
- Nations: 2
- Events: 26
- Dates: 7 – 11 June 2022
- Main venue: Mackay Aquatic and Recreation Centre

The 2022 Oceania Para Athletics Championships were the inaugural Oceania Para Athletics Championships for Oceania athletes with a disability. It was held at the Mackay Aquatic and Recreation Centre in Mackay, Queensland from 7 to 11 June 2022.

They were staged concurrently with the 2022 Senior, U20, and U18 Championships.

== Classification ==
All athletes are classified according to their impairment and competition is a combined format where athletes of multiple different classifications compete against each other. Each classification consists of a three character code, starting with a letter and followed by a two-digit number. The letter specifies the event type: T for track and jumping events, and F for throwing events. The first digit of the number specifies the type of impairment and the second digit the severity of the impairment; the lower the second number, the more impaired.

- T/F11–13 (visual impairment)
- T/F20 (intellectual impairment)
- T/F31–34 (wheelchair events for athletes with a movement disorder, including cerebral palsy)
- T/F35–38 (ambulant events for athletes with a movement disorder, including cerebral palsy)
- T/F40–41 (short stature, including dwarfism)
- T/F42–44 (leg impairment, lower limb affected by limb deficiency, leg length difference, impaired muscle power or impaired range of movement)
- T/F45–47 (arm impairment, upper limbs affected by limb deficiency, impaired muscle power or impaired range of movement)
- T/F51–57 (wheelchair events for athletes with a lower body impairment, including paraplegia)
- T/F61-64 (Lower limb/s competing with prosthesis affected by limb deficiency and leg length difference)

== Participating nations ==
Only two OAA member federations, Australia and New Zealand, participated in the Championships. The eight Australian States also fielded teams, separate from Australia, and were eligible for Championship medals. In addition, two invitational teams, Regional Australia and India (from the Asian Athletics Association) competed but were ineligible for Championship medals.

- Australia (35) (Host)
  - Australian Capital Territory
  - New South Wales
  - Northern Territory
  - Queensland
  - South Australia
  - Tasmania
  - Victoria
  - Western Australia
- New Zealand

Invitational teams.

- Regional Australia
- India

== Results ==
=== Men ===
Event	Gold		Silver		Bronze	
100 m ambulatory	James Turner (T36); Australia	12.00 (97.66%)	Jaydon Page (T47); Australia	11.12 (93.70%)	Alexander McKillop (T36); Australia	12.70 (92.28%)
100 m frame running	Caleb Reynolds (Rr2); Queensland	24.31 (76.26%)	Bobby Tagget (Rr2); Queensland	31.60 (64.33%)	Malcolm Wilson (Rr3); Queensland	28.82 (51.42%)
200 m ambulatory	Lindsey Hendy (T20); Queensland	24.17 (88.74%)	Mitch Joynt (T64); New Zealand	24.41 (87.13%)	Liam Wyatt (T01); Queensland	24.55 (86.15%)
400 m ambulatory	James Turner (T36); Australia	53.66 (96.36%)	Mitch Joynt (T64); New Zealand	54.74 (90.71%)	Riley Mann (T20); Australia	51.95 (90.20%)
800 m ambulatory	Jerome Etteridge (T11); New South Wales	2:11.00 (83.90%)				
1500 m ambulatory	Angus Hincksman (T38); Australia	4:10.18 (91.09%)				
Long jump ambulatory	Ari Gesini (T38); Australia	6.17 m (86.53%)	Joshua Lush (T20); New Zealand	6.35 m (83.11%)	Romone Lewin (T38); Northern Territory	5.04 m (70.68%)
Shot put ambulatory	Cam Crombie (F38); Australian Capital Territory	15.72 m (98.56%)	Marty Jackson (F38); Victoria	14.42 m (90.41%)	Ben Tuimaseve (F37); New Zealand	12.58 m (71.80%)
Shot put secured	Jesse Wyatt (F33); Australia	9.07 m (73.38%)	Michael Smith (F33); Victoria	6.58 m (53.24%)		
Discus throw ambulatory	Sam Paech (F37); South Australia	32.11 m (53.74%)	Raymond Abdy (F37); Queensland	23.55 m (39.41%)	Sean Gallagher (F37); Queensland	20.23 m (33.86%)
Discus throw secured						
Javelin throw ambulatory	Jackson Hamilton (F13); Australia	55.81 m (78.59%)	Sam Paech (F37); South Australia	31.53 m (54.54%)	Timothy D'Abrera (T20); Australian Capital Territory	21.39 m (37.63%)
Javelin throw secured						

=== Women ===
Event	Gold		Silver		Bronze	
100 m ambulatory	Rhiannon Clarke (T38); Australia	13.04 (94.93%)	Ella Pardy (T38); Australia	13.07 (94.72%)	Danielle Aitchison (T36); New Zealand	14.51 (94.27%)
100 m wheelchair	Natasha Price (T54); Queensland	24.72 (62.09%)				
100 m frame running	Isabella Auld (Rr1); Queensland	35.45 (66.54%)	Tarsha Tupper (Rr3); Queensland	30.70 (61.46%)		
200 m ambulatory	Danielle Aitchison (T36); New Zealand	31.09 (90.73%)	Mali Lovell (T36); Australia	31.54 (89.44%)	Tamsin Colley (T36); Australia	32.64 (86.42%)
200 m wheelchair	Natasha Price (T54); Queensland	44.06 (62.46%)				
400 m ambulatory	Alissa Jordaan (T47); Australia	1:01.98 (89.70%)	Ella Osborne (T47); Australia	1:07.09 (82.87%)	Indiana Cooper (T38); New South Wales	1:13.56 (81.93%)
400 m wheelchair	Natasha Price (T54); Queensland	1:29.55 (57.95%)				
800 m ambulatory						
800 m wheelchair	Natasha Price (T54); Queensland	3:20.43 (50.62%)				
Long jump ambulatory	Sarah Walsh (T64); Australia	5.38 m (87.62%)	Summer Giddings (T35); New South Wales	2.80 m (84.84%)	Niamh MacAlasdair (T37); Western Australia	4.04 m (77.39%)
Shot put ambulatory	Lisa Adams (F37); New Zealand	14.45 m (93.23%)	Holly Robinson (F46); New Zealand	10.51 m (84.28%)	Ella Hose (F37); Australia	9.91 m (63.94%)
Shot put secured	Rosemary Little (F32); Australia	5.83 m (82.81%)	Dayna Crees (F34); Australia	6.08 m (68.93%)	Sarah Clifton-Bligh (F32); Australia	4.74 m (67.32%)
Discus throw ambulatory	Sarah Edmiston (F44); Australia	33.79 m (75.88%)	Ella Hose (F37); Australia	25.13 m (65.63%)	Kirra Lockett (F37); New South Wales	24.55 m (64.12%)
Discus throw secured	Julie Charlton (F57); New South Wales	15.01 m (73.15%)				
Javelin throw ambulatory	Lillee Wakefield (F20); South Australia	18.91 m (47.54%)				
Javelin throw secured	Dayna Crees (F34); Australia	15.19 m (68.17%)				

== Medal table ==
* Host nation (Australia)

Rank	Nation / State	Gold	Silver	Bronze	Total
1	Australia*	12	6	5	23
2	Queensland*	7	3	3	13
3	New Zealand	2	4	2	8
4	New South Wales	2	1	2	5
5	South Australia	2	1	0	3
6	Australian Capital Territory	1	0	1	2
7	Victoria	0	2	0	2
8	Northern Territory	0	0	1	1
8	Western Australia	0	0	1	1
Totals (9 entries)		26	17	15	58
