= 2024 Oceania Para Athletics Championships =

Paralympic track and field event

- Host city: Suva, Fiji
- Nations: 8
- Events: 22
- Dates: 4 – 8 June 2022
- Main venue: HFC Bank Stadium

The 2024 Oceania Para Athletics Championships were the second Oceania Para Athletics Championships for Oceania athletes with a disability. It was held at the HFC Bank Stadium in Suva from 4 to 8 June 2024.

They were staged concurrently with the 2024 Senior, U18, and Masters Championships.

== Classification ==
All athletes are classified according to their impairment and competition is a combined format where athletes of multiple different classifications compete against each other. Each classification consists of a three character code, starting with a letter and followed by a two-digit number. The letter specifies the event type: T for track and jumping events, and F for throwing events. The first digit of the number specifies the type of impairment and the second digit the severity of the impairment; the lower the second number, the more impaired.

- T/F11–13 (visual impairment)
- T/F20 (intellectual impairment)
- T/F31–34 (wheelchair events for athletes with a movement disorder, including cerebral palsy)
- T/F35–38 (ambulant events for athletes with a movement disorder, including cerebral palsy)
- T/F40–41 (short stature, including dwarfism)
- T/F42–44 (leg impairment, lower limb affected by limb deficiency, leg length difference, impaired muscle power or impaired range of movement)
- T/F45–47 (arm impairment, upper limbs affected by limb deficiency, impaired muscle power or impaired range of movement)
- T/F51–57 (wheelchair events for athletes with a lower body impairment, including paraplegia)
- T/F61-64 (Lower limb/s competing with prosthesis affected by limb deficiency and leg length difference)

== Participating nations ==
Eight Oceania Athletics member federations participated. In addition, Regional Australia (an invitational team) competed but were ineligible for Championship medals. New Caledonia were initially scheduled to take part, however, due to a coinciding civil unrest in the territory, they were unable to send a team.

- Australia
- Fiji (Host)
- Kiribati
- New Zealand
- Papua New Guinea
- Solomon Islands
- Tonga
- Vanuatu

Invitational team.

- Regional Australia

== Results ==
=== Men ===
Event	Gold		Silver		Bronze	
100 m ambulatory	Jackson Love (T35); Australia	12.96 (90.82%)	Joe Smith (T37); New Zealand	12.24 (90.28%)	Alexander McKillop (T36); Australia	12.99 (90.22%)
200 m ambulatory	Steven Abraham (T/F46); Papua New Guinea	23.60 (89.70%)	Joe Smith (T37); New Zealand	25.33 (89.18%)	James Tirado (T/F13); Australia	23.92 (88.00%)
400 m ambulatory	Riley Mann (T20); Australia	53.13 (88.20%)	Cooper Robb-Jackson (T/F38); Australia	57.36 (86.00%)	Dillon Vidanapathirana (T/F20); Australia	59.41 (78.88%)
800 m ambulatory	Dillon Vidanapathirana (T/F20); Australia	2:28.96 (83.90%)				
Long jump ambulatory	Joshua Lush (T20); New Zealand	5.99 m (78.40%)	Jaxon Woolley (T38); New Zealand	5.00 m (70.13%)	Jimi Onitoro (T46); Fiji	4.85 m (63.98%)
Shot put ambulatory	Todd Hodgetts (F20); Australia	14.67 m (84.85%)	Semiti Matanitobua (F11); Fiji	10.00 m (65.53%)	Sitiveni Konataci (F42); Fiji	9.97 m (56.91%)
Shot put secured	Jesse Wyatt (F33); Australia	9.20 m (74.43%)	Matthew Sheppard (T54/F56); Australia	9.60 m (71.16%)	Breeze Pita (F57); Solomon Islands	8.82 m (70.73%)
Discus throw ambulatory	Sam Paech (T/F37); Australia	33.92 m (56.77%)	Zack Lappin (F37); New Zealand	32.64 m (54.63%)	Sitiveni Konataci (F42); Fiji	25.95 m (47.93%)
Discus throw secured	Matthew Sheppard (T54/F56); Australia	25.38 m (54.37%)	Jerome Bunge (F57); Papua New Guinea	24.56 m (50.59%)	Mac Denniston (F34); New Zealand	19.72 m (45.55%)
Javelin throw ambulatory	Ken Kahu (F ) Vanuatu	45.46 m (72.30%)	Matthew Thompson (F46); Australia	44.41 m (69.42%)	Junior Dennis (T47/F46); Papua New Guinea	42.19 m (65.95%)
Javelin throw secured	Jerome Bunge (F57); Papua New Guinea	29.93 m (60.76%)	Morea Mararos (F34); Papua New Guinea	21.72 m (56.18%)	Matthew Sheppard (T54/F56); Australia	22.17 m (51.87%)

=== Women ===
Event	Gold		Silver		Bronze	
100 m ambulatory	Akeesha Snowden (T37); Australia	14.57 (89.91%)	Sybella Warton (T37); Australia	15.13 (86.58%)	Niamh Mac Alasdair (T37); Australia	15.98 (81.91%)
200 m ambulatory	Akeesha Snowden (T37); Australia	30.16 (89.89%)	Sybella Warton (T37); Australia	31.56 (85.90%)	Kate Danaher (T37); New Zealand	35.36 (76.67%)
400 m ambulatory	Amelia Mazzei (T20); Australia	1:07.33 (-%)	Belinda Scott (T20); Australia	1:13.53 (-%)		
800 m ambulatory						
1500 m ambulatory	Belinda Scott (T20); Australia	5:53.67 (-%)				
Long jump ambulatory	Summer Giddings (T35); Australia	3.13 m (92.88%)	Kailyn Joseph (T/F37); Australia	4.12 m (78.93%)	Caytlyn Sharp (T/F20); Australia	4.68 m (77.39%)
Shot put ambulatory	Naibili Vatunisolo (F42); Fiji	9.05 m (77.75%)	Regina Edward (F44); Papua New Guinea	8.82 m (67.12%)	Selina Seau (F64); Fiji	7.38 m (66.19%)
Shot put secured	Ellie Enock (F57); Vanuatu	7.09 m (-%)	Julie Charlton (T54/F57); Australia	6.71 m (-%)	Rose Lidia (F57); Solomon Islands	5.78 m (-%)
Discus throw ambulatory	Sionann Murphy (F37); New Zealand	24.24 m (63.31%)	Charli Gardiner-Hall (F37); New Zealand	23.15 m (60.46%)	Naibili Vatunisolo (F42); Fiji	21.27 m (58.18%)
Discus throw secured	Milly Marshallkirkwood (F57); New Zealand	18.74 m (73.15%)	Ellie Enock (F57); Vanuatu	16.60 m (-%)	Julie Charlton (T54/F57); Australia	15.67 m (-%)
Javelin throw ambulatory	Selina Seau (F64); Fiji	19.22 m (72.23%)	Naibili Vatunisolo (F42); Fiji	21.33 m (67.69%)	Regina Edward (F44); Papua New Guinea	26.74 m (62.01%)
Javelin throw secured	Julie Charlton (T54/F57); Australia	12.45 m (-%)	Rose Lidia (F57); Solomon Islands	11.78 m (-%)		

== Medal table ==
* Host nation (Fiji)

Rank	Nation	Gold	Silver	Bronze	Total
1	Australia	13	8	7	28
2	New Zealand	3	5	2	10
3	Papua New Guinea	2	3	2	7
4	Fiji*	2	2	5	9
5	Vanuatu	2	1	0	3
6	Solomon Islands	0	1	2	3
Totals (6 entries)		22	20	18	60
