= 2017 Oceania U20 Athletics Championships =

VII Oceania U20 Athletics Championships
- Dates: 28 June–1 July
- Host city: Suva, Fiji,
- Venue: ANZ Stadium
- Level: Junior

The 2017 Oceania U20 Athletics Championships were held at the ANZ Stadium in Suva, Fiji, between June 28 and July 1, 2017. They were held together with the 2017 Oceania Senior Championships and the 2017 Oceania U18 Athletics Championships.

== Medal summary ==
Complete results can be found on the Oceania Athletics Association webpage.
