= 1998 Oceania Junior Athletics Championships =

III Oceania Junior Athletics Championships
- Dates: August 27–28, 1998
- Host city: Nukuʻalofa, Tonga
- Venue: Teufaiva Stadium
- Level: Junior
- Events: 37 (19 men, 18 women)
- Participation: 124 athletes from 14 nations

The 1998 Oceania Junior Athletics Championships were held at the Teufaiva Stadium in Nukuʻalofa, Tonga, between August 27–28, 1998. They were held together with the 1998 Oceania Open Championships. A total of 37 events were contested, 19 by men and 18 by women.

== Medal summary ==
Complete results can be found as compiled by Bob Snow on the Athletics Papua New Guinea, on the Athletics Weekly, and on the World Junior Athletics History webpages.

=== Boys under 20 (junior) ===
Event	Gold		Silver		Bronze	
100 metres (wind: +1.5 m/s)	Saula Roko (FIJ)	10.86	David Falealili (NZL)	11.00	Peter Maulder (NZL)	11.00
200 metres (wind: +3.0 m/s)	Jeffrey Bai (PNG)	21.46 w	David Falealili (NZL)	21.50 w	Andrew Foster (NZL)	21.96 w
400 metres	Remesio Namara (FIJ)	48.82	Cameron Brown (AUS)	48.84	Craig Wislang (NZL)	50.02
800 metres	Paul Hamblyn (NZL)	1:55.46	Gerard Solomon (VAN)	1:58.72	Niue Titi (SAM)	1:59.32
1500 metres	Paul Hamblyn (NZL)	4:05.54	Gerard Solomon (VAN)	4:09.44	Chris Votu (SOL)	4:12.62
5000 metres	Chris Votu (SOL)	16:08.48	Samuel Solomon (PNG)	16:20.98	Chris Saeni (SOL)	17:01.00
3000 metres steeplechase	Chris Votu (SOL)	10:27.34	Esala Talebula (FIJ)	10:50.48	Teremoana Tangikara (COK)	13:14.72
110 metres hurdles (wind: +2.4 m/s)	Ah Chong Sam Chong (SAM)	15.74 w	Leroy Muriki (PNG)	15.92 w	(French Polynesia) /Julien Crozet (TAH)	16.58 w
400 metres hurdles	Toetu'u Sapoi'aleki (TGA)	55.34	(French Polynesia) /Julien Crozet (TAH)	57.32	Niue Titi (SAM)	58.44
High jump	Ben Roper (NZL)	1.95	Robert Elder (FIJ)	1.95	Piliote Hafoka (TGA)	1.95
Pole vault	Tokaikolo Latapu (TGA)	2.80				
Long jump	Harmon Harmon (COK)	6.54 (wind: +1.1 m/s)	Tokaikolo Latapu (TGA)	6.53	Damien Daly (AUS)	6.52
Triple jump	Piliote Hafoka (TGA)	13.95	Leroy Muriki (PNG)	13.82 (wind: -1.5 m/s)	Timoci Tamani (FIJ)	13.74
Shot put	Mitchel Alatalo (AUS)	14.10	Sosefo Fonorito (FIJ)	13.72	Paul Niulala (TGA)	13.43
Discus throw	Daniel Goulding (AUS)	40.45	Sosefo Fonorito (FIJ)	37.49	Pio Fihaki (FIJ)	37.25
Hammer throw	Daniel Goulding (AUS)	53.32	Marceliano Fiakaifonu (VAN)	29.62	Paul Niulala (TGA)	25.48
Javelin throw	Sean Betland (AUS)	60.31	Joshua Kuruyawa (FIJ)	58.19	Kuli Kivalu (TGA)	53.92
4 x 100 metres relay	New Zealand; Andrew Foster; Peter Maulder; Craig Wislang; David Falealili	42.40	Fiji	43.20	Papua New Guinea; Leroy Muriki; Elias Roboam; Jerry Bata; Jeffrey Bai	43.48
4 x 400 metres relay	Fiji	3:22.20	New Zealand; Craig Wislang; Paul Hamblyn; Andrew Foster; David Falealili	3:29.82	Papua New Guinea; Jerry Bata; Leroy Muriki; Sandy Katusele; Elias Roboam	3:32.90

=== Girls under 20 (Junior) ===
Event	Gold		Silver		Bronze	
100 metres (wind: -0.9 m/s)	Nicola Morris (NZL)	12.56	Carly Cairns (AUS)	12.68	Tamsyn McGarva (NZL)	12.72
200 metres (wind: -1.0 m/s)	Nicola Morris (NZL)	25.28	Monica Jonathan (PNG)	25.36	Vasiti Vatureba (FIJ)	25.78
400 metres	Vasiti Vatureba (FIJ)	60.02	Elsie Daiwo (SOL)	61.70	Mere Marama (FIJ)	61.92
800 metres	Kirsty Turnbull (NZL)	2:15.60	Kate McMaster (AUS)	2:20.74	Elsie Daiwo (SOL)	2:36.50
1500 metres	Moana Burt (NZL)	4:37.14	Sebiuta Senivetaukula (FIJ)	5:14.06		
3000 metres	Moana Burt (NZL)	9:59.70	Sebiuta Senivetaukula (FIJ)	11:42.26		
100 metres hurdles (wind: +2.4 m/s)	(French Polynesia) /Cecile Tiatia (TAH)	15.96 w	Avikali Kainoko (FIJ)	16.06 w	Falemaama Fakapulia (TGA)	16.30 w
400 metres hurdles	Avikali Kainoko (FIJ)	63.74	(French Polynesia) /Cecile Tiatia (TAH)	67.12	Lata Manoa (TGA)	67.72
High jump	Vicki Collins (AUS)	1.80	Tamsyn McGarva (NZL)	1.55	Lesieli Halafihi (TGA)	1.50
Pole vault	Lesieli Halafihi (TGA)	1.85				
Long jump	Lanuola Keil (SAM)	5.76	Vicki Collins (AUS)	5.30	Miriam Waleilia (SOL)	4.64
Triple jump	Sarah Sydney (AUS)	12.43	Lata Manoa (TGA)	10.71	Lesieli Halafihi (TGA)	10.60
Shot put	Victoria Lowrie (NZL)	12.94	(French Polynesia) /Noella Flores (TAH)	12.23	Melehifo Uhi (TGA)	11.46
Discus throw	Louise McNamara (AUS)	40.02	(French Polynesia) /Noella Flores (TAH)	39.40	Siniva Marsters (COK)	38.12
Hammer throw	Sharyn Tennent (AUS)	47.97	Michelle Phillips (NZL)	47.84	Stacey Rogers (NZL)	42.20
Javelin throw	Tiffany Dudman (AUS)	42.87	Sisilia Lau (FIJ)	41.84	Melehifo Uhi (TGA)	37.64
4 x 100 metres relay	Tonga	50.00	Australia	51.44	New Zealand; Michelle Phillips; Victoria Lowrie; Tamsyn McGarva; Nicola Morris	51.56
4 x 400 metres relay	Fiji	4:04.46	Tonga	4:19.94		

== Medal table (unofficial) ==
* Host nation (Tonga)

Rank	Nation	Gold	Silver	Bronze	Total
1	New Zealand (NZL)	10	5	6	21
2	Australia (AUS)	9	5	1	15
3	Fiji (FIJ)	6	10	4	20
4	Tonga (TON)*	5	3	10	18
5	Solomon Islands (SOL)	2	1	4	7
6	Samoa (SAM)	2	0	2	4
7	Papua New Guinea (PNG)	1	4	2	7
8	French Polynesia (TAH)	1	4	1	6
9	Cook Islands (COK)	1	0	2	3
10	Vanuatu (VAN)	0	3	0	3
Totals (10 entries)		37	35	32	104

== Participation (unofficial) ==
An unofficial count yields the number of about 124 athletes from 15 countries:

- Australia (13)
- Cook Islands (5)
- Fiji (19)
- Kiribati (1)
- Federated States of Micronesia (6)
- Nauru (6)
- New Zealand (13)
- Norfolk Island (6)
- Palau (3)
- Papua New Guinea (8)
- Samoa (7)
- Solomon Islands (5)
- (French Polynesia) /Tahiti (8)
- Tonga (20)
- Vanuatu (4)
