= 2010 Oceania Junior Athletics Championships =

IV Oceania Junior Athletics Championships
- Dates: September 23–25
- Host city: Cairns, Australia
- Venue: Barlow Park
- Level: Junior
- Events: 33 (15 men, 18 women)
- Participation: 113 athletes from 20 nations

The 2010 Oceania Junior Athletics Championships were held at the Barlow Park in Cairns, Australia, between September 23–25, 2010. They were held together with the 2010 Oceania Open Championships. A total of 33 events were contested, 15 by men and 18 by women.

== Medal summary ==
Complete results can be found on the Oceania Athletics Association, and on the World Junior Athletics History webpages.

=== Boys under 20 (Junior) ===
Event	Gold		Silver		Bronze	
100 metres (wind: +2.0 m/s)	Ratu Banuve Tabakaucoro (FIJ)	10.80	(New Caledonia) /David Alexandrine (NCL)	11.06	Joe Matmat (PNG)	11.07
200 metres (wind: -0.6 m/s)	Ratu Banuve Tabakaucoro (FIJ)	21.69	Beniamino Maravu (FIJ)	21.84	Michael Jackson (NIU)	22.71
400 metres	Beniamino Maravu (FIJ)	48.01	Ratutira Narara (FIJ)	48.24	Matthew Bailey (AUS)	48.56
800 metres	(New Caledonia) /Adrien Kela (NCL)	1:52.92	Matthew Bailey (AUS)	1:55.91	Ratutira Narara (FIJ)	1:56.38
1500 metres	(New Caledonia) /Adrien Kela (NCL)	4:02.89	Rorey Hunter (AUS)	4:05.66	Veherney Babob (PNG)	4:09.36
5000 metres	Chris Tiva (SOL)	18:09.50	Rico Flores (GUM)	18:32.44	Joseph Kramer (MHL)	21:26.90
3000 metres steeplechase	Billy Bragg (AUS)	10:48.12	Chris Tiva (SOL)	11:08.95		
110 metres hurdles (wind: -0.5 m/s)	Peter Callagher (NZL)	14.92	(New Caledonia) /Christopher Leroy (NCL)	15.38	Michael Herreros (GUM)	16.97
400 metres hurdles	Campbell Wu (NZL)	56.46	Mark Edgerton (AUS)	59.48	Jeofry Limtiaco (GUM)	60.67
Long jump	Andy Kruy (NZL)	7.04 w (wind: +4.2 m/s)	Andrew Moore (NZL)	6.83 w (wind: +4.5 m/s)	Zinzan Fern (NZL)	6.59 w (wind: +2.3 m/s)
Triple jump	Raihau Maiau (PYF)	14.07 w (wind: +3.0 m/s)	Daniel Fake (NZL)	14.05 w (wind: +3.5 m/s)	Todd Swanson (NZL)	13.96 w (wind: +2.6 m/s)
Shot put	Solomone Vaka (NZL)	14.48	Dagaban Harris (NRU)	12.64	Sunnity Aritema (KIR)	12.46
Discus throw	Solomone Vaka (NZL)	50.08	Sunnity Aritema (KIR)	36.51	Dagaban Harris (NRU)	32.96
Javelin throw	Dougwin Franz (PLW)	59.79	Ben Langton-Burnell (NZL)	58.46	Daniel Tutai (COK)	56.75
4 x 100 metres relay	New Zealand; Peter Callagher; Andy Kruy; Zac Topping; Daniel Dyet	50.40				

=== Girls under 20 (Junior) ===
Event	Gold		Silver		Bronze	
100 metres (wind: +2.3 m/s)	Lauren Wilson (NZL)	12.15 w	Lovelite Detenamo (NRU)	12.64 w	Patricia Taea (COK)	12.73 w
200 metres (wind: -0.9 m/s)	Lauren Wilson (NZL)	24.96	Venessa Waro (PNG)	25.63	Mele Toa (TGA)	26.83
400 metres	Katherine Camp (NZL)	57.00	Suliana Gusuivalu (FIJ)	57.34	Venessa Waro (PNG)	57.75
800 metres	Chelsea Dartnell (AUS)	2:19.36	Tuna Tine (PNG)	2:19.39	Donna Koniel (PNG)	2:22.79
1500 metres	Tuna Tine (PNG)	5:09.23	Dephanie Aito (PNG)	5:09.55	Sharon Firisua (SOL)	5:15.71
3000 metres	Maria Kuanduma (PNG)	11:17.00	Dephanie Aito (PNG)	11:19.20	Anna Pius (PNG)	11:40.43
3000 metres steeplechase	Dephanie Aito (PNG)	12:10.43	Maria Kuanduma (PNG)	12:19.69	Tuna Tine (PNG)	12:21.13
100 metres hurdles (wind: -1.1 m/s)	Zoe Ballantyne (NZL)	14.83	Portia Bing (NZL)	14.88	Oceané Lefranc (PYF)	16.48
400 metres hurdles	Alexandra Skerten (NZL)	63.65	Zoe Ballantyne (NZL)	65.77	Emily Keehn (AUS)	70.70
High jump	Elizabeth Lamb (NZL)	1.80	Tara Strano (AUS)	1.68	Charlotte Muschamp (NZL)	1.68
Long jump	Portia Bing (NZL)	5.70 w (wind: +3.4 m/s)	Greer Alsop (NZL)	5.48 w (wind: +2.9 m/s)	Kalina Mama'o (TGA)	5.08 w (wind: +4.5 m/s)
Triple jump	Greer Alsop (NZL)	12.11 w (wind: +3.6 m/s)	Kerri Tibbs (AUS)	11.69 w (wind: +3.5 m/s)	Charlotte Muschamp (NZL)	11.56 w (wind: +4.4 m/s)
Shot put	Margaret Satupai (SAM)	16.34	Merewarahi Vaka (NZL)	13.36		
Discus throw	Merewarahi Vaka (NZL)	47.76	Pellma Hesus (PLW)	21.02		
Hammer throw^{†}	Annaliisa Geraghty (AUS)	46.73				
Javelin throw	Patricia Taea (COK)	37.17	Li'amwar Rangamar (NMI)	35.17		
Heptathlon	Pellma Hesus (PLW)	2205				
4 x 100 metres relay	New Zealand; Portia Bing; Alexandra Skerten; Katherine Camp; Merewarahi Vaka	49.18				

^{†}: In the women's hammer throw event, Gabrielle Neighbour from Australia was 1st with 62.99m, Karyne Di Marco was 2nd with 62.15m, Bronwyn Eagles from Australia was 3rd with 59.24m, and Breanne Clement from Australia was 4th with 49.65m, all starting as guests.

== Medal table (unofficial) ==
* Host nation (Australia)

Rank	Nation	Gold	Silver	Bronze	Total
1	New Zealand (NZL)	16	7	4	27
2	Papua New Guinea (PNG)	3	5	6	14
3	Australia (AUS)*	3	5	2	10
4	Fiji (FIJ)	3	3	1	7
5	New Caledonia (NCL)	2	2	0	4
6	Palau (PLW)	2	1	0	3
7	Solomon Islands (SOL)	1	1	1	3
8	Cook Islands (COK)	1	0	2	3
9	French Polynesia (PYF)	1	0	1	2
10	Samoa (SAM)	1	0	0	1
11	Nauru (NRU)	0	2	1	3
12	Guam (GUM)	0	1	2	3
13	Kiribati (KIR)	0	1	1	2
14	Northern Mariana Islands (NMI)	0	1	0	1
15	Tonga (TON)	0	0	2	2
16	Marshall Islands (MHL)	0	0	1	1
16	Niue (NIU)	0	0	1	1
Totals (17 entries)		33	29	25	87

== Participation (unofficial) ==
An unofficial count yields the number of about 113 athletes from 20 countries:

- Australia (12)
- Cook Islands (3)
- Fiji (5)
- French Polynesia (3)
- Guam (7)
- Kiribati (4)
- Marshall Islands (2)
- Nauru (6)
- /New Caledonia (3)
- New Zealand (21)
- Niue (6)
- Norfolk Island (2)
- Northern Mariana Islands (5)
- Palau (5)
- Papua New Guinea (13)
- Samoa (3)
- Solomon Islands (4)
- Tonga (4)
- Tuvalu (2)
- Vanuatu (3)
