= Carmen Hunter =

Australian high jumper

Personal information
- Nationality: Australia
- Born: 1978 (age 47–48)

Sport
- Sport: Athletics
Medal record
Women's athletics
Representing Australia
Oceania Championships
Gold medal – first place	1994 Auckland	High jump
Oceania Junior Championships
Gold medal – first place	1994 Auckland	High jump
- Updated on 19 April 2013

Carmen Hunter (born 1978) is a former Australian high jump champion and national record holder. In 2001, she won the Australian National Championships held in Brisbane.

Carmen won her first national title aged 12 at the Australia Little Athletics Championships held in Canberra, 1991. She went on to claim further Australian titles and represented Australia at minor international track and field championships.

Carmen's performance at the 1992 Australian All Schools Championships held in Perth, where she won the U15 title with a jump of 1.85m, has seen her cited in the "absolute world records" listing for the best performance by female aged 14.11.

== Achievements ==
Year	Competition	Venue	Position	Event	Notes
Representing Australia
1994	Oceania Junior Championships	Auckland, New Zealand	1st	High jump	1.80 m
1994	Oceania Championships	Auckland, New Zealand	1st	High jump	1.77 m
