= 1997 Oceania Youth Athletics Championships =

III Oceania Youth Athletics Championships
- Dates: July 11–12
- Host city: Suva, Fiji
- Venue: National Stadium
- Level: Youth
- Events: 33 (17 boys, 16 girls)
- Participation: 170 (96 boys, 74 girls) athletes from 17 nations

The 1997 Oceania Youth Athletics Championships were held at the National Stadium in Suva, Fiji, between July 11–12, 1997. A total of 33 events were contested, 17 by boys and 16 by girls.

== Medal summary ==
Complete results can be found as compiled by Bob Snow on the Athletics Papua New Guinea, on the Athletics Weekly, and on the World Junior Athletics History webpages.

=== Boys under 18 (Youth) ===
Event	Gold		Silver		Bronze	
100 metres	Paulson Gebo (PNG)	11.12	Lency Olitisa (SOL)	11.14	Reuben Apuri (SOL)	11.18
200 metres	Paulson Gebo (PNG)	22.88	Reuben Apuri (SOL)	22.90	Lency Olitisa (SOL)	23.00
400 metres	Pita Kunagogo (FIJ)	51.24	Keith Andrews (FIJ)	52.66	Harmon Harmon (COK)	52.94
800 metres	Ben Ruthe (NZL)	1:56.26	Casper Pule (SOL)	2:00.20	Derek Jang (FIJ)	2:02.68
1500 metres	Ben Ruthe (NZL)	4:13.80	Liam Scopes (NZL)	4:15.76	Chris Votu (SOL)	4:16.12
3000 metres	Liam Scopes (NZL)	8:56.70	Chris Votu (SOL)	8:59.10	Lennon Wicks (AUS)	9:10.07
2000 metres steeplechase	Chris Votu (SOL)	7:14.34	Lennon Wicks (AUS)	7:23.40	Shakeel Khan (FIJ)	8:08.76
110 metres hurdles	Graham Pether (AUS)	15.06	Tevita Fungalei (TGA)	15.14	Tokaikolo Latapu (TGA)	15.74
300 metres hurdles	Toetu'u Sapoi'aleki (TGA)	38.68	Alex Green (AUS)	40.10	Tevita Fungalei (TGA)	40.46
High jump	Robert Elder (FIJ)	1.93	Benjamin Weeks (AUS)	1.91	Petero Manufolau (FIJ)	1.87
Long jump	Tokaikolo Latapu (TGA)	6.83	Noa Niuvou (FIJ)	6.27	Tita Bayu (PNG)	6.19
Triple jump	Khamal Ganley (NZL)	14.40	Timoci Tamani (FIJ)	13.58	Benjamin Evans (FIJ)	13.47
Shot put	Fesaitu Inoke (FIJ)	13.94	Sosefo Fonorito (FIJ)	12.84	Marceliano Fiakaifonu (VAN)	11.83
Discus throw	Daniel Goulding (AUS)	50.34	Fesaitu Inoke (FIJ)	42.56	Sosefo Fonorito (FIJ)	40.04
Hammer throw	Daniel Goulding (AUS)	52.20	Marceliano Fiakaifonu (VAN)	34.90	Pio Fihaki (FIJ)	25.32
Javelin throw	Kurt Mead (AUS)	53.70	Stuart Farquhar (NZL)	52.54	Lagani Ratulevu (FIJ)	51.76
800 metres Medley relay (100m x 100m x 200m x 400m)	Fiji	1:35.04	Solomon Islands	1:35.50	Australia	1:36.18

=== Girls under 18 (Youth) ===
Event	Gold		Silver		Bronze	
100 metres	Sarah Phillips (NZL)	12.14	Andrea Miller (NZL)	12.20	Josivini Maria (FIJ)	12.50
200 metres	Andrea Miller (NZL)	25.30	Josivini Maria (FIJ)	26.14	Helen Philemon (PNG)	27.18
400 metres	Sally Ward (NZL)	58.26	Vasiti Vatureba (FIJ)	61.14	Antonia Urakupa (PNG)	64.44
800 metres	Melissa Thomas (NZL)	2:11.90	Sally Ward (NZL)	2:12.28	Irinieta Vakaudekula (FIJ)	2:30.12
1500 metres	Odette Jesson (NZL)	4:42.40	Tresha Moxham (AUS)	4:47.86	(French Polynesia) /Vaite Bounhoure (TAH)	5:06.18
3000 metres	Odette Jesson (NZL)	9:56.88	Tresha Moxham (AUS)	10:03.01	Sebiuta Senivetaukula (FIJ)	11:13.94
100 metres hurdles	Andrea Miller (NZL)	14.76	Falemaama Fakapulia (TGA)	16.40	(French Polynesia) /Cecile Tiatia (TAH)	16.46
300 metres hurdles	Avikali Kainoko (FIJ)	46.06	Mere Rasavere (FIJ)	47.60	(French Polynesia) /Cecile Tiatia (TAH)	48.18
High jump	Melissa Tucker (AUS)	1.70	Matelita Dere (FIJ)	1.59	Rosalia Raqato (FIJ)	1.53
Long jump	Andrea Miller (NZL)	5.56	Sarah Phillips (NZL)	5.50	Melissa Tucker (AUS)	5.50
Triple jump	Melissa Tucker (AUS)	11.87	Vaciseva Maisiri (FIJ)	10.36	Lanuola Keil (SAM)	9.46
Shot put	Ngaina Karena (NZL)	11.39	Sulueti Tatauisi (FIJ)	10.77	Elita To'oala (SAM)	10.53
Discus throw	Ngaina Karena (NZL)	43.06	Siniva Marsters (COK)	38.74	Louise McNamara (AUS)	36.52
Hammer throw	Stacey Rogers (NZL)	39.10	Siniva Marsters (COK)	25.34	Sainiana Lesu (FIJ)	19.50
Javelin throw	Johanna L'Estrange (AUS)	41.38	Brooke Stevenson (AUS)	38.96	Sisilia Lau (FIJ)	36.80
800 metres Medley relay (100m x 100m x 200m x 400m)	New Zealand	1:49.64	Fiji	1:52.10	(French Polynesia) /Tahiti	1:59.50

== Medal table (unofficial) ==
* Host nation (Fiji)

Rank	Nation	Gold	Silver	Bronze	Total
1	New Zealand (NZL)	16	5	0	21
2	Australia (AUS)	7	6	4	17
3	Fiji (FIJ)*	5	12	13	30
4	Tonga (TON)	2	2	2	6
5	Papua New Guinea (PNG)	2	0	3	5
6	Solomon Islands (SOL)	1	5	3	9
7	Cook Islands (COK)	0	2	1	3
8	Vanuatu (VAN)	0	1	1	2
9	French Polynesia (TAH)	0	0	4	4
10	Samoa (SAM)	0	0	2	2
Totals (10 entries)		33	33	33	99

== Participation (unofficial) ==
An unofficial count yields the number of about 170 athletes from 17 countries:

- American Samoa (6)
- Australia (12)
- Cook Islands (7)
- Fiji (37)
- Guam (8)
- Federated States of Micronesia (6)
- Nauru (6)
- New Zealand (11)
- Norfolk Island (4)
- Northern Mariana Islands (8)
- Palau (7)
- Papua New Guinea (7)
- Samoa (19)
- Solomon Islands (9)
- (French Polynesia) /Tahiti (8)
- Tonga (7)
- Vanuatu (8)
