= 2026 Oceania U20 Athletics Championships =

Sports competition in Darwin, Australia

- Organisers: Oceania Athletics
- Edition: 10th
- Dates: 21–23 May
- Host city: Darwin
- Venue: Arafura Stadium
- Level: Under 20
- Type: Outdoor
- Events: 35

The 2026 Oceania U20 Athletics Championships, also known colloquially by its former official title, the Oceania Junior Championships, will be an international athletics competition for Oceania athletes qualifying as juniors (born no earlier than 1 January 2007). The event is due to be staged in Darwin, Northern Territory, Australia from 21 to 23 May 2026. This will also be the sixth time Australia will host the Championships.

For the first time in its history, this edition of the U20 Championships will be exclusively for Pacific Island member federations. Hence, Australia and New Zealand will not be competing. The Championships will also be held concurrently with the Senior, U18, Para, Age Group (formerly Masters), and the U16 Championships.

== Event schedule ==
The first draft schedule was published in December 2025.

== Medal table ==
Rank	Nation	Gold	Silver	Bronze	Total
Totals (0 entries)		0	0	0	0

== Medal summary ==
=== Men ===
Event	Gold	Silver	Bronze
100 metres			
200 metres			
400 metres			
800 metres			
1500 metres			
5000 metres			
110 metres hurdles			
400 metres hurdles			
3000 metres steeplechase			
5000 metres walk			
High jump			
Long jump			
Triple jump			
Shot put			
Discus throw			
Javelin throw			
Hammer throw			
WR world record | AR area record | CR championship record | GR games record | NR national record | OR Olympic record | PB personal best | SB season best | WL world leading (in a given season)

=== Women ===
Event	Gold	Silver	Bronze
100 metres			
200 metres			
400 metres			
800 metres			
1500 metres			
5000 metres			
100 metres hurdles			
400 metres hurdles			
3000 metres steeplechase			
5000 metres walk			
High jump			
Long jump			
Triple jump			
Shot put			
Discus throw			
Javelin throw			
Hammer throw			
WR world record | AR area record | CR championship record | GR games record | NR national record | OR Olympic record | PB personal best | SB season best | WL world leading (in a given season)

=== Mixed ===
Event	Gold	Silver	Bronze
4 × 400 metres relay			

* Indicates the athletes only competed in the preliminary heats and received medals

== Participating nations ==
These U20 Championships will be for Pacific Island member federations only. New Zealand and hosts, Australia, will not be competing.

- American Samoa (1)
- Cook Islands (4)
- Fiji (9)
- French Polynesia (5)
- Kiribati
- New Caledonia
- Niue
- Northern Mariana Islands (2)
- Papua New Guinea (2)
- Solomon Islands
- Tonga
- Tuvalu
- Wallis and Futuna
