= 1996 Oceania Junior Athletics Championships =

II Oceania Junior Athletics Championships
- Dates: November 28–30
- Host city: Townsville, Australia
- Level: Junior
- Events: 35 (18 men, 17 women)
- Participation: 112 athletes from 16 nations

The 1996 Oceania Junior Athletics Championships were held in Townsville, Australia, between November 28–30, 1996. They were held together with the 1996 Oceania Open Championships. A total of 35 events were contested, 18 by men and 17 by women.

== Medal summary ==
Complete results can be found as compiled by Bob Snow on the Athletics Papua New Guinea, on the Athletics Weekly, and on the World Junior Athletics History webpages.

=== Boys under 20 (Junior) ===
Event	Gold		Silver		Bronze	
100 metres (wind: +0.9 m/s)	Wagui Anau (AUS)	10.50	Dallas Roberts (NZL)	10.85	Ryan McCabe (AUS)	10.97
200 metres (wind: +3.2 m/s)	Wagui Anau (AUS)	21.55 w	Dallas Roberts (NZL)	21.70 w	Jeffrey Bai (PNG)	21.84 w
400 metres	Jeffrey Bai (PNG)	49.48	Clement Abai (PNG)	49.99	Henele Taliai (TGA)	50.21
800 metres	Mark Abercromby (AUS)	1:58.70	(French Polynesia) /Isaac Yaya (TAH)	1:59.47	Victor Anderson (SOL)	2:00.41
1500 metres	Chris Votu (SOL)	4:09.57	David Kanie (PNG)	4:11.71	Gerard Solomon (VAN)	4:18.32
5000 metres	David Kanie (PNG)	15:57.49	Chris Votu (SOL)	16:11.31	Gerard Solomon (VAN)	17:17.23
3000 metres steeplechase	Chris Votu (SOL)	10:12.64	Joseph Nunua (SOL)	11:26.22	Frank Paaga (ASA)	12:01.61
110 metres hurdles (wind: +1.7 m/s)	Graham Pether (AUS)	15.33	Ah Chong Sam Chong (SAM)	15.47	Joseph Rodan (FIJ)	15.65
400 metres hurdles	Kuripitone Betham (SAM)	55.49	Julian Watt (NZL)	55.96	Leroy Muriki (PNG)	56.71
High jump	Zane Dockray (AUS)	2.01	Julien Jansen (AUS)	2.01	Hapo Maliaki (PNG)	1.95
Long jump	Justin Griffiths (AUS)	7.02 w (wind: +2.3 m/s)	Wagui Anau (AUS)	6.90 w (wind: +2.2 m/s)	Patrick Fonoti (SAM)	6.84 w (wind: +2.2 m/s)
Triple jump	Josh Ferguson (AUS)	15.01 w (wind: +3.4 m/s)	Clinton Joyce (AUS)	14.78 (wind: +1.0 m/s)	Fagamanu Sofai (SAM)	14.15 (wind: +1.4 m/s)
Shot put	Christopher Gaviglio (AUS)	16.13	Faleono Seve (NZL)	15.06	Luke Poli (AUS)	14.71
Discus throw	Luke Poli (AUS)	49.20	Christopher Gaviglio (AUS)	48.14	Shaka Sola (NZL)	48.04
Hammer throw	Faleono Seve (NZL)	44.30	Daniel Goulding (AUS)	43.04	Charles Winchester (COK)	30.40
Javelin throw	Ashley Hollins (AUS)	60.68	Blair Stewart (NZL)	59.30	David Couper (NZL)	55.16
4 x 100 metres relay	Australia	42.51	Papua New Guinea	43.17	Fiji	43.23
4 x 400 metres relay	Papua New Guinea	3:22.99	Australia	3:27.07	Samoa	3:34.34

=== Girls under 20 (Junior) ===
Event	Gold		Silver		Bronze	
100 metres (wind: +1.2 m/s)	Kate Smith (AUS)	12.46	Charlotte Hastings (NZL)	12.50	Carly Cairns (AUS)	12.51
200 metres (wind: +1.6 m/s)	Melissa Toigo (AUS)	25.30	Linda Ningo (PNG)	27.23	Jodie McCoy (NFK)	27.44
400 metres	Jennene Hansen (AUS)	58.70	Sally Ward (NZL)	59.50	Jodie McCoy (NFK)	65.93
800 metres	Sally Ward (NZL)	2:22.20	Belinda Smith (AUS)	2:29.31	Alicia Taia (COK)	2:44.12
1500 metres	Anna Geise (AUS)	4:33.85	Sarah Biss (NZL)	4:43.67	Alexis Gillham (AUS)	4:50.40
3000 metres	Sarah Biss (NZL)	9:50.77	Anna Geise (AUS)	9:51.83	Alexis Gillham (AUS)	10:25.67
100 metres hurdles (wind: +2.3 m/s)	Charlotte Hastings (NZL)	14.77 w	Alana Weir (AUS)	15.95 w		
400 metres hurdles	Alana Weir (AUS)	68.93				
High jump	Vicki Collins (AUS); Andrea Smith (AUS)	1.74			Erana Peeti (NZL)	1.50
Long jump	Melissa Toigo (AUS)	5.77 (wind: +1.1 m/s)	Andrea Smith (AUS)	5.67 w (wind: +3.4 m/s)	Charlotte Hastings (NZL)	5.62 w (wind: +3.7 m/s)
Triple jump	Alana Weir (AUS)	11.85 w (wind: +2.7 m/s)	Erana Peeti (NZL)	11.45 w (wind: +3.5 m/s)	Elizabeth Murphy (AUS)	10.86 w (wind: +4.1 m/s)
Shot put	Alana Morley (AUS)	11.98	Joanne Morris (AUS)	11.89	Hayley Wilson (NZL)	11.29
Discus throw	Sharyn Tennent (AUS)	38.44	Helen Wallis (AUS)	36.84	Belinda King (NZL)	31.68
Hammer throw	Belinda King (NZL)	47.38	Sharyn Tennent (AUS)	41.38	Michelle Phillips (NZL)	41.36
Javelin throw	Hayley Wilson (NZL)	46.96	Joanne Tennent (AUS)	41.60	Brooke Stevenson (AUS)	36.58
4 x 100 metres relay	Australia	48.90	New Zealand	52.56		
4 x 400 metres relay	Australia	3:57.10	New Zealand	4:29.20		

== Medal table (unofficial) ==
* Host nation (Australia)

Rank	Nation	Gold	Silver	Bronze	Total
1	Australia (AUS)*	24	14	7	45
2	New Zealand (NZL)	6	11	7	24
3	Papua New Guinea (PNG)	3	4	3	10
4	Solomon Islands (SOL)	2	2	1	5
5	Samoa (SAM)	1	1	3	5
6	French Polynesia (TAH)	0	1	0	1
7	Cook Islands (COK)	0	0	2	2
7	Fiji (FIJ)	0	0	2	2
7	Norfolk Island (NFI)	0	0	2	2
7	Vanuatu (VAN)	0	0	2	2
11	American Samoa (ASA)	0	0	1	1
11	Tonga (TON)	0	0	1	1
Totals (12 entries)		36	33	31	100

== Participation (unofficial) ==
An unofficial count yields the number of about 112 athletes from 16 countries:

- American Samoa (5)
- Australia (34)
- Cook Islands (5)
- Fiji (5)
- Guam (1)
- Federated States of Micronesia (2)
- Nauru (6)
- New Zealand (14)
- Norfolk Island (4)
- Northern Mariana Islands (3)
- Papua New Guinea (11)
- Samoa (7)
- Solomon Islands (7)
- (French Polynesia) /Tahiti (5)
- Tonga (1)
- Vanuatu (2)
