= Glenn Howard (footballer) =

Australian rules footballer

Personal information
- Born: 17 November 1962 (age 63)
- Original team: Burwood United
- Height: 185 cm (6 ft 1 in)
- Weight: 80 kg (176 lb)

Playing career^{1}
Years	Club	Games (Goals)
1981–1986	Hawthorn	23 (3)
1987	Collingwood	14 (4)
Total		37 (7)
- ^{1} Playing statistics correct to the end of 1987.

Glenn Howard (born 17 November 1962) is a former Australian rules footballer who played with Hawthorn and Collingwood in the Victorian Football League (VFL).

== VFL ==
Recruited from Burwood United, Howard had an injury-plagued VFL career, which started in 1981 after he made his way up from the Under 19s. He made seven appearances late in the season, then played only the opening two rounds in 1982 and just once in 1983, a premiership year. In both the 1984 and 1985 seasons, Howard didn't play a single senior game. He finally had an extended run in the team in 1986, with 13 games, but didn't take part in Hawthorn's finals campaign, which ended in a fourth successive grand final appearance and second premiership in four years. In 1987 he played 14 games for Collingwood, but didn't play at all in 1988 and was cut from their list at the end of the year. He suffered two broken legs during his career.

=== VFA ===
He was captain of the Sandringham Football Club in 1989 and 1990, winning their best and fairest in the first of those years.
