= Telaya Blacksmith =

Australian Paralympic athlete

Personal information
- Nationality: Australian
- Born: 3 December 2007 (age 18)

Sport
- Country: Australia
- Sport: Athletics
- Disability: T20

Telaya Blacksmith (born 3 December 2007) is an Australian T20 para-athlete. Telaya has a diagnosed Intellectual Impairment and Neurological Disorder that affects movement. [1]

She competed at the 2024 Paris Paralympics, becoming Australia's 16th Aboriginal Paralympian, and the first Warlpiri Paralympic athlete.

== Personal life ==
Blacksmith is Warlpiri. She was born in Perth and raised in the Aboriginal community of Lajamanu in the Northern Territory.

Cathy Freeman was her idol growing up.

In 2024, she lived in Sydney and attended Endeavour Sports High School.

== Athletics ==
At 14, she represented Australia at the 2022 Virtus Oceania Asia Games in Brisbane and then the 2023 Virtus Global Games in Vichy, France. In 2024, Blacksmith holds the Australian under 15, under 17 and under 20 T20 records in the 100 m, 200 m and long jump. At the 2024 Paris Paralympics, she competed in the 400m T20 where she holds the Australian under 17, under 20 and open T20 records, breaking the Oceanic record on her way to finishing 8th in the final. In the Women's Long Jump T20, she finished ninth. At the 2025 World Para Athletics Championships in New Delhi, she finished eighth in the Women's 400 T20 and tenth in Women's Long Jump T20.

== Australian rules football ==
In 2024, Blacksmith played Australian rules football with the Miranda Bombers and was in the Sydney Swans AFL academy.

== Recognition ==
- 2021 - Illawarra Academy of Sport's Brett Stibners Award for 2020-21 AWD Athlete of the Year.
- 2024 - National Junior Sportsperson of the Year National Indigenous Sporting Awards.
