= Rene A. Zacchini =

French-American politician

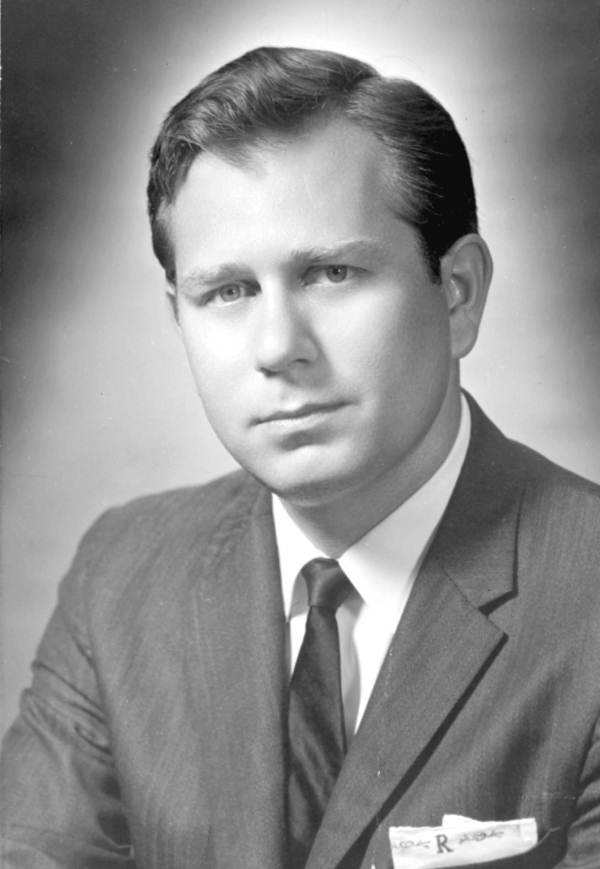
- Zacchini in 1962

Member of the Florida House of Representatives from Hillsborough County
- In office 1962–1966

Personal details
- Born: March 28, 1930 Paris, France
- Died: April 13, 2010 (aged 80)
- Party: Democratic
- Spouse: Joan E. Zacchini
- Education: University of Florida

Rene A. Zacchini (March 28, 1930 – April 13, 2010) was a French-American politician. He served as a Democratic member of the Florida House of Representatives.

== Life and career ==
Zacchini attended the University of Florida.

In 1962, Zacchini was elected to the Florida House of Representatives, serving until 1966.

Zacchini died on April 13, 2010, at the age of 80.
