= Death of Madison Scott =

Missing person from British Columbia, Canada

Maddy Scott
- Born: 29 April 1991
- Disappeared: 28 May 2011 (aged 20); Vanderhoof, British Columbia, Canada
- Body discovered: May 2023; Vanderhoof, British Columbia, Canada
- Education: Nechako Valley Secondary School
- Occupation: Apprentice heavy duty mechanic
- Height: 5 ft 4 in (163 cm)

Madison Geraldine Scott (born 29 April 1991) was a Canadian woman who disappeared on 28 May 2011, after a party she attended at Hogsback Lake, 25 kilometres southeast of Vanderhoof, British Columbia.

One day after the twelfth anniversary of her disappearance, on 29 May 2023, Royal Canadian Mounted Police (RCMP) stated the remains of Madison Scott had been identified after being found earlier that month at a rural property on the east side of Vanderhoof.

== Background ==
Madison Scott was born to Eldon and Dawn Scott on April 29, 1991; she had two siblings, Ben and Georgia. Maddy, as she was known, enjoyed dirt biking, figure skating, horseback riding, team sports and hanging out with her friends. She worked as an apprentice heavy duty mechanic in the logging industry with her father, and was described by her brother as someone who was as comfortable in a dress as she was in work coveralls. Scott spent most of her life in Vanderhoof, where she graduated from Nechako Valley Secondary School in 2009.

=== Physical characteristics ===
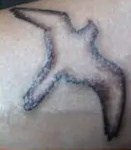
Tattoo Madison Scott got on her inside left wrist the month before her disappearance

At the time of her disappearance, Scott was described as Caucasian, 20 years old, weighing 160–180 pounds (73–82 kg), with a height of 5 feet 4 inches (163 cm), green eyes, and natural ginger hair colour. She had a nose piercing and numerous ear piercings. Scott had the inside of her left wrist tattooed with the image of a bird.

=== Character and personal life ===
Scott was described as having a vivacious, fun-loving, playful, social personality and would often do things on the spur of the moment. She was reportedly caring, affectionate, and generous. Scott enjoyed performing with and for her friends in short amateur video productions. Scott was mostly focused on social endeavours at school, although she met the academic demands of her school.

== Disappearance ==
Scott traveled to Hogsback Lake in her white 1990 Ford F-150 pickup truck with her friend Jordi Bolduc for a party on the evening of May 27, 2011, but had retired to her tent and sleeping bag. Scott sent text messages to her father.

The party had been intended for a group of friends. However, it got posted on Facebook, and a larger, non-cohesive group showed up as the evening wore on. A fight broke out around midnight and Bolduc, injured, left with her new boyfriend. According to Bolduc, she asked Scott to go, but Scott declined. Bolduc and her boyfriend came back to the campsite at about 8:30 a.m. the next day to collect Bolduc's clothes and sleeping bag. Bolduc found Scott's tent unzipped with her sleeping bags and items moved to the side. She said that she didn't see Scott and didn't report Scott's absence to anyone.

=== Timeline ===
Approximate timeline of Madison Scott's movements
Note	Start	End
Scott went to Hogsback Lake with Jordi Bolduc and gathered firewood.	20:00, 27 May 2011	20:30, 27 May 2011
Scott returned home to pick up a larger tent and poles. She talked briefly with her mother.	20:30, 27 May 2011	21:30, 27 May 2011
Scott arrived back at Hogsback, set up the tent, and settled in for the night some time during the party.	21:30, 27 May 2011	22:00, 27 May 2011
Scott had a text conversation with her father.	23:00, 27 May 2011	00:30, 28 May 2011
Bolduc asked Scott to leave with her and Bolduc's boyfriend. Scott declined to leave with them. She stayed in her tent.	00:30, 28 May 2011	01:40, 28 May 2011
Some people from the party asked if Scott wanted to leave with them. People left in groups.	01:40, 28 May 2011	03:00, 28 May 2011
Bolduc reported she returned to Hogsback to pick up her sleeping bag and clothes and discovered Scott's tent unzipped and her sleeping bag pushed to the side. Bolduc didn't see Scott.	08:30, 28 May 2011	08:30, 28 May 2011
A larger party on Saturday night had approximately 150 people in attendance. Scott's tent had been flattened.	28 May 2011	29 May 2011
Scott's parents arrived at Hogsback Lake, where they found the collapsed tent and locked pickup truck. Dawn called RCMP to report the disappearance.	12:30 29 May 2011	12:30 29 May 2011

=== Second party ===
A second party occurred where Scott was last seen in the evening of Saturday 28 May 2011. Someone flattened Scott's tent; this individual was identified and questioned by RCMP, but nothing was reported to the public regarding motives.

== Investigation ==
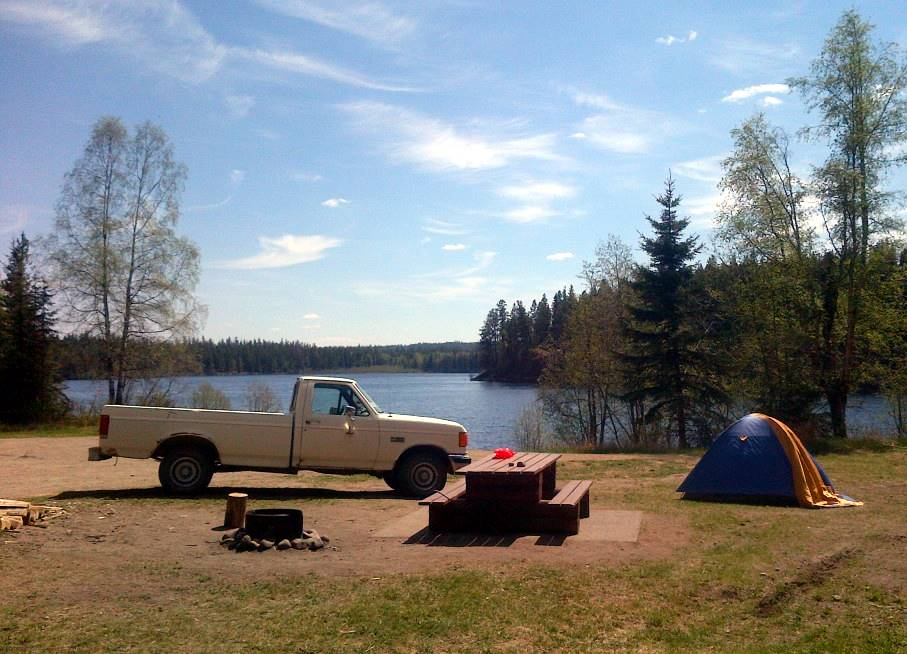
Re-creation of Madison Scott's campsite

RCMP said that there was no sign of a struggle. Apart from the clothes which she was wearing, the only two items known to be missing with her were her iPhone 4 with a light blue case and a large bundle of keys, including a Ford key, on a Gothic style lanyard.

=== Search effort ===
The area around Hogsback Lake was searched extensively. Hogsback Lake is about 128 acres and 22 feet at its deepest, with clear water (10+ feet visibility). It is located 26 km southeast of Vanderhoof. Soil type in the area is mainly glacial till composed of sand, gravel and clay, with a basalt bedrock.

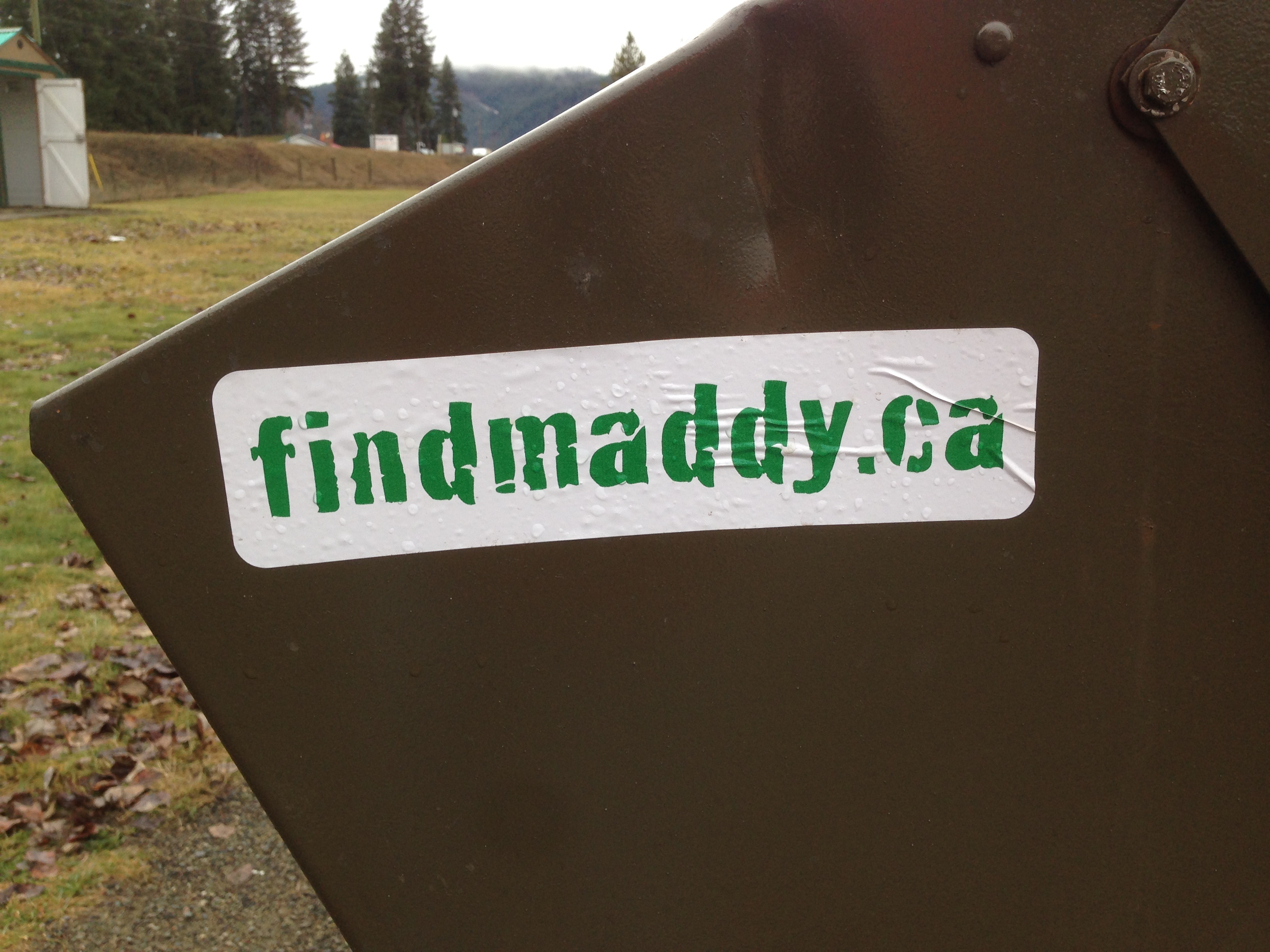
Bumper sticker for raising awareness of Madison Scott's disappearance

The area was searched by foot, quad, horseback, helicopter using a forward-looking infrared camera, divers, cadaver dogs, boat, car and truck. According to Dawn Scott, there was a particularly extensive search effort in the initial days of the disappearance, with search crews walking in extended lines, hand-in-hand, checking in at 10 p.m., cadaver dogs searching and dive teams scouring the lake. The helicopter search included the use of forward-looking infrared in the early morning hours, as the ground was cool and body heat would stand out. The helicopter search covered an area east to west between Isle Pierre and Fraser Lake, and north to south between Fort St. James and south of Sinkut Mountain (Finger Lake/Paddock Lake), totaling an area of approximately 2788.16 km^{2} (50 km x 71 km ellipse). The boat search included the use of side-scanning sonar.

Madison Scott's family and friends distributed information about her disappearance via billboards, signs, and media. A reward of $100,000 was advertised for anyone sharing information leading to the arrest of whoever was responsible. The family and friends of Scott put on an annual poker ride to raise awareness. Case coverage in media included an episode of 48 Hours, a documentary film produced by Scottish director Steven F. Scouller, video blogs and a Crime Stoppers video about her disappearance.

== Theories ==
RCMP saw no evidence of anything that would cause Scott to leave the campsite on her own, such as a flat tire. Rick Beatty from Vanderhoof Search and Rescue said that, like RCMP, many assisting the search came to the conclusion that Scott must have left in a vehicle because there was no evidence to indicate that she had left on foot.

=== Foul play ===
RCMP believe that foul play was involved in the disappearance of Madison Scott.

Jordi Bolduc reported that some people unknown to her arrived at the party later. Police stated that they had interviewed all the partygoers of the night of 27 May 2011. They reported that they had no reason to believe that a party attendee was responsible for Scott's disappearance, nor had they identified anyone who would have had a grudge against Scott or a reason to harm her. The police reported that people cooperated with requests for polygraph tests.

Some have theorized that Scott's disappearance is related to the Highway of Tears and missing and murdered indigenous women along the Highway 16 corridor, but Scott's case is not classed as such because it does not fit the criteria.

Another theory is the involvement of Fribjon Bjornson, a 28-year-old single father who had a history of drug abuse. In an interview for 48 Hours, Bolduc said that Scott and Bjornson had spent time together socially. Police investigated Bjornson's potential involvement with Scott's disappearance, but police and the victims' families do not believe there are any significant links between the two cases. Bjornson was murdered in 2012, in Nak'azdli.

== Discovery of remains ==
Madison Scott's remains were discovered and identified in May 2023, 12 years (almost to the day) after her disappearance, at a rural property several kilometres from Hogsback Lake.

Days later, on Saturday, 3 June, 2023, a vigil in her memory was held at Nechako Valley Secondary School, attended by an estimated 2,000 people.

== See also ==
- List of solved missing person cases (post-2000)
- List of unsolved deaths
