= Oceania U20 Athletics Championships =

Biennial championships by Oceania Athletics Association

- Status: Active
- Genre: Under-20 athletics Oceania Championships
- Date: Varying
- Frequency: Biennial
- Country: Varying
- Years active: 32
- Inaugurated: February 23, 1994 (as 1994 Oceania Junior Athletics Championships)
- Previous event: 2022 Mackay
- Next event: 2026 Darwin
- Organiser: Oceania Athletics

The Oceania U20 Athletics Championships is an athletics competition organized by the Oceania Athletics Association (OAA) open to under-20 athletes from member and associate member associations. It was called the Oceania Junior Athletics Championships from 1994 to 2014. The competition is held biennially together with the Oceania Open Championships for the first time in 1994 until 1998, and again since 2010. In 2012, the new regional "East–West" format was applied with Medals now being awarded for athletes from both the Eastern and the Western Region by separating the results correspondingly.

== Editions ==
Number	Year	City	Country	Date	Venue	No. of Events	No. of Athletes
1	1994	Auckland	New Zealand	23–26 February		34	143
2	1996	Townsville	Australia	28–30 November		35	112
3	1998	Nuku'alofa	Tonga	27–28 August	Teufaiva Stadium	37	124
4	2010	Cairns	Australia	23–25 September	Barlow Park	33	113
5	2012	Cairns	Australia	27–29 June	Barlow Park	35	138
6	2014	Rarotonga	Cook Islands	24–26 June	BCI Stadium	41	140
7	2017	Suva	Fiji	28 June – 1 July	National Stadium		
8	2019	Townsville	Australia	25–28 June	Townsville Sports Reserve		
9	2022	Mackay	Australia	8–10 June	Mackay Aquatic and Recreation Centre		
10	2026	Darwin	Australia	21–23 May	Arafura Stadium		

== Records ==
The list of records was compiled from various sources.

=== Men ===
Event	Record	Athlete	Nationality	Date	Meet	Place	Notes
100 m	10.50 (+0.9 m/s)	Wagui Amau	Australia	28 November 1996	1996 Championships	Townsville, Australia	
200 m	21.41 (+1.7 m/s)	Nicholas Bate	Australia	June 2014	2014 Championships	Rarotonga, Cook Islands	
400 m	47.67	Batinisavu Uluiyata	Fiji	June 2014	2014 Championships	Rarotonga, Cook Islands	
800 m	1:52.92	Adrien Kela	/New Caledonia	September 2010	2010 Championships	Cairns, Australia	
1500 m	4:02.09	Nick Burrow	New Zealand	26 November 1996	1996 Championships	Townsville, Australia	
5000 m	14:51.31	Duncan Ross	New Zealand	26 February 1994	1994 Championships	Auckland, New Zealand	
10,000 m	34:02.75	Matthew Dryden	New Zealand	June 2014	2014 Championships	Rarotonga, Cook Islands	
110 m hurdles (99/100 cm)	14.74 (−2.0 m/s)	Larry Sulunga	Tonga	June 2017	2017 Championships	Suva, Fiji	
400 m hurdles	53.69	Zion Armstrong	New Zealand	23 February 1994	1994 Championships	Auckland, New Zealand	
3000 m steeplechase	9:53.84	Matthew Gluyas	Australia	June 2017	2017 Championships	Suva, Fiji	
High jump	2.15 m	Glen Howard	New Zealand	25 February 1994	1994 Championships	Auckland, New Zealand	
Pole vault	3.80 m	Alani Hakalo	Tonga	February 1994	1994 Championships	Auckland, New Zealand	
Long jump	7.21 m (−1.0 m/s)	Nicholas van Gelder	Australia	June 2014	2014 Championships	Rarotonga, Cook Islands	
Triple jump	14.98 m (+1.8 m/s)	Phillip Wyatt	New Zealand	June 2012	2012 Championships	Cairns, Australia	
Shot put (6 kg)	17.23 m	Raiarii Thompson	French Polynesia	June 2017	2017 Championships	Suva, Fiji	
Discus throw (1.75 kg)	52.90 m	Nathaniel Sulupo	Samoa	June 2017	2017 Championships	Suva, Fiji	
Hammer throw	59.76 m	Alex Fafeita	New Zealand	29 June 2012	2012 Championships	Cairns, Australia	
Javelin throw	66.55 m	Calum Dean	Australia	June 2017	2017 Championships	Suva, Fiji	
Octathlon	5282 pts	Max Attwell	New Zealand	June 2014	2014 Championships	Rarotonga, Cook Islands	
Octathlon	100m (wind) / Long jump (wind) / Shot put / 400m / 110m H (wind) / High jump / Javelin / 1000m; 11.37 (+1.0 m/s) / 6.04 m (+2.4 m/s) / 9.94 m / 50.86 / 17.47 (+0.9 m/s) / 1.99 m / 38.81 m / 2:41.70						
Decathlon	6485 pts	Felix McDonald	New Zealand	June 2017	2017 Championships	Suva, Fiji	
Decathlon	100m (wind) / Long jump (wind) / Shot put / High jump / 400m / 110m H (wind) / Discus / Pole vault / Javelin / 1500m; 11.37 (NWI) / 7.16 m (NWI) / 10.20 m / 1.77 m / 51.37 / 15.27 (NWI) / 32.89 m / 3.20 m / 52.69 m / 4:48.58						
4 × 100 m relay	42.07		New Zealand	26 February 1994	1994 Championships	Auckland, New Zealand	
4 × 400 m relay	3:18.53	Joshua Head; Jared Micallef; Benjamin MacKay; Louis Stenmark	Australia	June 2017	2017 Championships	Suva, Fiji	

=== Women ===
Event	Record	Athlete	Nationality	Date	Meet	Place	Notes
100 m	12.19 (−1.1 m/s)	Georgia Hulls	New Zealand	June 2017	2017 Championships	Suva, Fiji	
200 m	23.96 (−0.5 m/s)	Jesicca Payne	Australia	June 2017	2017 Championships	Suva, Fiji	
400 m	53.59	Pirrenee Steinert	Australia	23 September 2010	2010 Championships	Cairns, Australia	
800 m	2:11.17	Holly Manning	New Zealand	June 2014	2014 Championships	Rarotonga, Cook Islands	
1500 m	4:29.97	Georgia Winkcup	Australia	June 2014	2014 Championships	Rarotonga, Cook Islands	
5000 m	18:14.88	Shania Murray	Australia	June 2017	2017 Championships	Suva, Fiji	
10,000 m	37:54.18	Libby Jacques	Australia	June 2014	2014 Championships	Rarotonga, Cook Islands	
100 m hurdles (76.2 cm)	14.79 (+0.0 m/s)	Mackenzie Keenan	New Zealand	June 2012	2012 Championships	Cairns, Australia	
400 m hurdles	1:00.63	Jarmilla Murphy-Knight	Australia	June 2017	2017 Championships	Suva, Fiji	
3000 m steeplechase	10:37.91	Georgia Winkcup	Australia	June 2014	2014 Championships	Rarotonga, Cook Islands	
High jump	1.80 m	Carmen Hunter	Australia	23 February 1994	1994 Championships	Auckland, New Zealand	
High jump	1.80 m	Vicki Collins	Australia	August 1998	1998 Championships	Nuku'alofa, Tonga	
High jump	1.80 m	Elizabeth Lamb	New Zealand	September 2010	2010 Championships	Cairns, Australia	
Pole vault	3.40 m	Kate Abfalter	Australia	June 2017	2017 Championships	Suva, Fiji	
Long jump	5.98 m (+1.5 m/s)	Nadia Smith	New Zealand	26 February 1994	1994 Championships	Auckland, New Zealand	
Triple jump	12.43 m (NWI)	Sarah Sydney	Australia	28 August 1998	1998 Championships	Nuku'alofa, Tonga	
Shot put	16.34 m	Margaret Satupai	Samoa	23 September 2010	2010 Championships	Cairns, Australia	
Discus throw	47.76 m	Merewarihi Vaka	New Zealand	24 September 2010	2010 Championships	Cairns, Australia	
Hammer throw	59.24 m	Bronwyn Eagles	Australia	25 September 2010	2010 Championships	Cairns, Australia	
Javelin throw	47.38 m (old design)	Bina Ramesh	New Caledonia	February 1994	1994 Championships	Auckland, New Zealand	
Javelin throw	45.49 m (new design)	Tori Peeters	New Zealand	June 2012	2012 Championships	Cairns, Australia	
Heptathlon	4877 pts	Tiana Morrison	Australia	June 2017	2017 Championships	Suva, Fiji	
Heptathlon	100m H (wind) / High jump / Shot put / 200m (wind) / Long jump (wind) / Javelin / 800m; 14.84 (NWI) / 1.71 m / 10.33 m / 26.47 (NWI) / 5.49 m (NWI) / 33.91 m / 2:38.45						
5000 m track walk	24:55.14	Jayde Hill	Australia	24 June 2014	2014 Championships	Rarotonga, Cook Islands	
4 × 100 m relay	47.67	Grace Brennan; Jessica Payne; Sophie McGovern; Georgie Boal	Australia	June 2017	2017 Championships	Suva, Fiji	
4 × 400 m relay	3:54.91	Maddy Scott; Jessica Haig; Kasey Moore; Grace Victor	Australia	June 2014	2014 Championships	Rarotonga, Cook Islands	
