= List of Tahitian records in swimming =

This is a list of the swimming national records for Tahiti. These are the fastest times ever swum by a swimmer representing Tahiti, for both long course (50m) and short course (25m) pools.

These records are kept by the Tahiti's national swimming federation: la Fédération Tahitienne de Natation (FTN).

The information below is based on a listing of the records posted on the website of the Tahitian club Cercle des Nageurs de Polynésie, based in Papeete where FTN is also based.

== Long course (50 metres) ==
=== Men ===
| Event | Time | | Name | Club | Date | Meet | Location | Ref |
|---|---|---|---|---|---|---|---|---|
| 50 m freestyle | 23.17 | | Teiki Dupont | Tahiti | 13 July 2019 | Pacific Games | Apia, Samoa | |
| 100 m freestyle | 50.44 | r | Stéphane Debaere | Tahiti | 6 July 2015 | Pacific Games | Port Moresby, Papua New Guinea | |
| 200 m freestyle | 1:51.83 | | Nael Roux | Tahiti | 8 May 2026 | Oceania Championships | Suva, Fiji | |
| 400 m freestyle | 3:56.35 | | Rahiti De Vos | Tahiti | 13 July 2019 | Pacific Games | Apia, Samoa | |
| 800 m freestyle | 8:20.94 | | Nael Roux | Tahiti | 11 May 2026 | Oceania Championships | Suva, Fiji | |
| 1500 m freestyle | 15:40.47 | | Rahiti De Vos | Tahiti | 12 July 2019 | Pacific Games | Apia, Samoa | |
| 50 m backstroke | 26.20 | | Keha Desbordes | Tahiti | 21 November 2023 | Pacific Games | Honiara, Solomon Islands | |
| 100 m backstroke | 57.53 | | Keha Desbordes | Tahiti | 24 November 2023 | Pacific Games | Honiara, Solomon Islands | |
| 200 m backstroke | 2:09.19 | | Teiki Dupont | Tahiti | 11 July 2015 | Pacific Games | Port Moresby, Papua New Guinea | |
| 50 m breaststroke | 28.29 | h | Stéphane Debaere | Tahiti | 8 July 2015 | Pacific Games | Port Moresby, Papua New Guinea | |
| 100 m breaststroke | 1:03.46 | | Rainui Teriipaia-Rentier | Tahiti | 6 July 2015 | Pacific Games | Port Moresby, Papua New Guinea | |
| 200 m breaststroke | 2:23.58 | | Rainui Teriipaia | Tahiti | 30 Aug 2007 | Pacific Games | Apia, Samoa | |
| 50 m butterfly | 24.04 | | Nicolas Vermorel | Tahiti | 9 July 2019 | Pacific Games | Apia, Samoa | |
| 100 m butterfly | 53.98 | | Nicolas Vermorel | - | | | | |
| 200 m butterfly | 2:04.23 | | Rahiti De Vos | Tahiti | 10 July 2015 | Pacific Games | Port Moresby, Papua New Guinea | |
| 200 m individual medley | 2:08.05 | | Nael Roux | CN Polynésie | 19 July 2024 | Championship Open Pierrelatte | Pierrelatte, France | |
| 400 m individual medley | 4:35.94 | | Nael Roux | Tahiti | 9 May 2026 | Oceania Championships | Suva, Fiji | |
| 4×50 m freestyle relay | 1:41.49 | | H. Walker; J.M. Guyvet; T. Ellacott; T. Cowan | French Polynesia | 3 March 2003 | - | | |
| 4×100 m freestyle relay | 3:25.02 | | Stephane Debaere (50.44); Hugo Lambert (51.16); Rahiti De Vos (51.55); Anthony Clark (51.87) | Tahiti | 6 July 2015 | Pacific Games | Port Moresby, Papua New Guinea | |
| 4×200 m freestyle relay | 7:37.50 | | Hugo Lambert (1:53.26); Rahiti De Vos; Stéphane Debaere; Anthony Clark | Tahiti | 7 July 2015 | Pacific Games | Port Moresby, Papua New Guinea | |
| 4×50 m medley relay | 1:55.22 | | H. Walker; O. A Lo; T. Ellacott; T. Cowan | French Polynesia | 5 March 2004 | - | | |
| 4×100 m medley relay | 3:48.40 | | Teiki Dupont (58.97); Rainui Teriipaia-Rentier (1:02.88); Hugo Lambert (56.18); Stéphane Debaere (50.37) | Tahiti | 11 July 2015 | Pacific Games | Port Moresby, Papua New Guinea | |

Legend: # – Record awaiting ratification by FTN; WR – World record; OC – Oceanian record;
Records not set in finals: h – heat; sf – semifinal; r – relay 1st leg; rh – relay heat 1st leg; b – B final; † – en route to final mark; so – swim-off; tt – time trial

=== Women ===
| Event | Time | | Name | Club | Date | Meet | Location | Ref |
|---|---|---|---|---|---|---|---|---|
| 50 m freestyle | 26.73 | | Laurence Lacombe | Cercle des Nageurs de Polynésie | 17 Aug 1985 | Championnats de France Elite | Dunkerque, France | |
| 100 m freestyle | 57.23 | | Laurence Lacombe | Cercle des Nageurs de Polynésie | 16 Aug 1985 | Championnats de France Elite | Dunkerque, France | |
| 200 m freestyle | 2:08.43 | | Deotille Videau | CN Polynesie | 19 April 2026 | Polynesian Championships | Papeete, French Polynesia | |
| 400 m freestyle | 4:38.12 | | Diane Lacombe | French Polynesia | 14 Sep 1991 | Pacific Games | Port Moresby, Papua New Guinea | |
| 800 m freestyle | 9:31.30 | | Deotille Videau | CN Polynesie | 14 March 2026 | Joel Rossi | Papeete, French Polynesia | |
| 1500 m freestyle | 18:08.27 | | Deotille Videau | CN Polynesie | 19 April 2026 | Polynesian Championships | Papeete, French Polynesia | |
| 50 m backstroke | 30.87 | | Angeline Tregoat | - | | | | |
| 100 m backstroke | 1:07.13 | | Deotille Videau | CN Polynesie | 18 April 2026 | Polynesian Championships | Papeete, French Polynesia | |
| 200 m backstroke | 2:27.52 | | Diane Lacombe | Cercle des Nageurs de Polynésie | 28 Jul 1989 | Championnats de France Elite d'été | Tours, France | |
| 50 m breaststroke | 34.08 | h | Poerani Bertrand | Tahiti | 11 July 2019 | Pacific Games | Apia, Samoa | |
| 100 m breaststroke | 1:14.23 | | Poerani Bertrand | Tahiti | 13 July 2019 | Pacific Games | Apia, Samoa | |
| 200 m breaststroke | 2:40.73 | | Poerani Bertrand | Tahiti | 9 July 2019 | Pacific Games | Apia, Samoa | |
| 50 m butterfly | 27.88 | | Deotille Videau | Tahiti | 8 May 2026 | Oceania Championships | Suva, Fiji | |
| 100 m butterfly | 1:01.63 | | Deotille Videau | Tahiti | 10 May 2026 | Oceania Championships | Suva, Fiji | |
| 200 m butterfly | 2:20.44 | | Deotille Videau | Unattached | 24 May 2025 | New Zealand Championships | Auckland, New Zealand | |
| 200 m individual medley | 2:19.63 | | Deotille Videau | Tahiti | 11 May 2026 | Oceania Championships | Suva, Fiji | |
| 400 m individual medley | 4:59.07 | | Deotille Videau | Unattached | 21 May 2025 | New Zealand Championships | Auckland, New Zealand | |
| 4×100 m freestyle relay | 4:09.58 | | Heimaruiti Bonnard (1:00.71); Deotille Videau (1:02.56); Vaihau Taumihau-Gatien (1:02.94); Lili Paillisse (1:03.37) | Tahiti | 20 November 2023 | Pacific Games | Honiara, Solomon Islands | |
| 4×200 m freestyle relay | 9:21.82 | | Diane Lacombe; Annaig Guennou; Graziella Rossi; K. Tatard | French Polynesia | 12 Sep 1991 | Pacific Games | Port Moresby, Papua New Guinea | |
| 4×100 m medley relay | 4:35.58 | | Angeline Tregoat; Poerani Bertrand; Alizee Diaz; Reva Reignier | Tahiti | 9 July 2019 | Pacific Games | Apia, Samoa | |

Legend: # – Record awaiting ratification by FTN; WR – World record; OC – Oceanian record;
Records not set in finals: h – heat; sf – semifinal; r – relay 1st leg; rh – relay heat 1st leg; b – B final; † – en route to final mark; so – swim-off; tt – time trial

=== Mixed relay ===
| Event | Time | Name | Club | Date | Meet | Location | Ref |
|---|---|---|---|---|---|---|---|
| 4×50 m freestyle relay | 1:44.01 | Nicolas Vermorel; Teiki Dupont; Angeline Tregoat; Reva Reignier | Tahiti | 12 July 2019 | Pacific Games | Apia, Samoa | |
| 4×100 m freestyle relay | | | | | | | |
| 4×50 m medley relay | 1:53.33 | | Tahiti | 13 July 2019 | Pacific Games | Apia, Samoa | |
| 4×100 m medley relay | | | | | | | |

Legend: # – Record awaiting ratification by FTN; WR – World record; OC – Oceanian record;
Records not set in finals: h – heat; so – swim-off

== Short course (25 metres) ==
=== Men ===
| Event | Time | | Name | Club | Date | Meet | Location | Ref |
|---|---|---|---|---|---|---|---|---|
| 50 m freestyle | 23.57 | | A. Clark | CNP | 17 December 2010 | - | | |
| 100 m freestyle | 52.81 | | A. Clark | CNP | 19 December 2010 | - | | |
| 200 m freestyle | 1:56.95 | | Heimanu Sichan | TAH | 21 November 2010 | - | | |
| 400 m freestyle | 4:07.37 | | Heimanu Sichan | TAH | 5 December 2010 | - | | |
| 800 m freestyle | 08:43.17 | | Heimanu Sichan | CNP | 21 Dec 2008 | - | | |
| 1500 m freestyle | 16:23.18 | | Heimanu Sichan | CNP | 21 Dec 2008 | - | | |
| 50 m backstroke | 28.22 | | Heimanu Sichan | CNP | 8 Dec 2007 | - | | |
| 100 m backstroke | 1:00.85 | | Manuarii Fagneaux | CNP | 14 Nov 1998 | - | | |
| 200 m backstroke | - | | - | | - | | | |
| 50 m breaststroke | 29.08 | | Rainui Teriipaia | CNP | 14 November 2009 | - | | |
| 100 m breaststroke | 1:02.88 | | Rainui Teriipaia | Fei Pi | 6 Dec 2003 | - | | |
| 200 m breaststroke | 2:22.90 | | Rainui Teriipaia | Fei Pi | 7 Dec 2003 | - | | |
| 50 m butterfly | - | | - | | - | | | |
| 100 m butterfly | - | | - | | - | | | |
| 200 m butterfly | - | | - | | - | | | |
| 100 m individual medley | 59.60 | | Rainui Teriipaia | Fei Pi | 12 Dec 2003 | - | | |
| 200 m individual medley | 2:12.58 | h | Heimanu Sichan | Tahiti | 5 December 2014 | World Championships | Doha, Qatar | |
| 400 m individual medley | 4:46.13 | h | Heimanu Sichan | Tahiti | 4 December 2014 | World Championships | Doha, Qatar | |
| 4×50 m freestyle relay | 1:39.54 | | Tunui Cowan; Donovan Dexter; Tamatoa Cowan; M. Faahu | OL Pirae | 2 Dec 2006 | - | | |
| 4×100 m freestyle relay | 3:41.14 | | Bertrand Hubert; David Teriipaia; Laurent Boullay; Daniel Teriipaia | Fei Pi | 21 Feb 1998 | - | | |
| 4×200 m freestyle relay | 8:13.17 | | Bertrand Hubert; David Teriipaia; Laurent Boullay; Daniel Teriipaia | Fei Pi | 22 Feb 1998 | - | | |
| 4×50 m medley relay | 1:49.62 | | M Aitamai; Rainui Teriipaia; A. Priet; R. Cojan | I Mua | 12 February 2011 | - | | |
| 4×100 m medley relay | 4:06.41 | | Vatea Beysselance; Arthur Agnieray; Yann Lausan; Ralph Tcha | AS Pirae | 18 Nov 2001 | - | | |

Legend: # – Record awaiting ratification by FTN; WR – World record; OC – Oceanian record;
Records not set in finals: h – heat; sf – semifinal; r – relay 1st leg; rh – relay heat 1st leg; b – B final; † – en route to final mark; so – swim-off; tt – time trial

=== Women ===
| Event | Time | Name | Club | Date | Meet | Location | Ref |
|---|---|---|---|---|---|---|---|
| 50 m freestyle | - | - | | - | | | |
| 100 m freestyle | - | - | | - | | | |
| 200 m freestyle | 2:09.21 | Crystal Laughlin | CNP | 15 November 2009 | - | | |
| 400 m freestyle | 4:34.29 | Crystal Laughlin | CNP | 5 March 2009 | Polynesian Championships | Papeete, French Polynesia | |
| 800 m freestyle | 9:25.48 | Crystal Laughlin | CNP | 24 October 2009 | - | | |
| 1500 m freestyle | - | - | | - | | | |
| 50 m backstroke | - | - | | - | | | |
| 100 m backstroke | - | - | | - | | | |
| 200 m backstroke | - | - | | - | | | |
| 50 m breaststroke | 36.51 | Vaea Sichan | CNP | 9 November 1996 | - | | |
| 100 m breaststroke | 1:19.08 | Vaea Sichan | CNP | 2 March 1997 | - | | |
| 200 m breaststroke | 2:49.74 | Vaea Sichan | CNP | 23 February 1997 | - | | |
| 50 m butterfly | - | - | | - | | | |
| 100 m butterfly | - | - | | - | | | |
| 200 m butterfly | - | - | | - | | | |
| 100 m individual medley | 1:08.19 | Crystal Laughlin | CNP | 15 November 2009 | - | | |
| 200 m individual medley | - | - | | - | | | |
| 400 m individual medley | - | - | | - | | | |
| 4×50 m freestyle relay | 1:56.27 | Nancy Lau; Rarahu David; Raina Vongue; Lacken Malateste | Fei Pi | 3 December 2006 | - | | |
| 4×100 m freestyle relay | 4:14.88 | L. Lacombe; G. Rossi; S. Tcha; K. Lemaitre | French Polynesia | 12 December 1987 | - | | |
| 4×200 m freestyle relay | 9:21.82 | D. Lacombe; A. Guennou; G. Rossi; K. Tatard | French Polynesia | 12 September 1991 | - | | |
| 4×50 m medley relay | 2:12.68 | Lacken Malateste; Rarahu David; Raina Vongue; Nancy Lau | Fei Pi | 17 February 2007 | - | | |
| 4×100 m medley relay | 4:49.35 | D. Lacombe; Vaea Sichan; C. Marty; M. Taofifenua | French Polynesia | 18 August 1995 | - | | |

Legend: # – Record awaiting ratification by FTN; WR – World record; OC – Oceanian record;
Records not set in finals: h – heat; sf – semifinal; r – relay 1st leg; rh – relay heat 1st leg; b – B final; † – en route to final mark; so – swim-off; tt – time trial
