= List of Fijian records in swimming =

The Fijian records in swimming are the fastest ever performances of swimmers from Fiji, which are recognised and ratified by Fiji Swimming.

All records were set in finals unless noted otherwise.

== Long Course (50 m) ==
=== Men ===
Event	Time		Name	Club	Date	Meet	Location	Ref
50 m freestyle	21.92	h	David Young	Unattached	4 December 2025	U.S. Open	Austin, United States	
100 m freestyle	49.38	b	David Young	Unattached	6 December 2025	U.S. Open	Austin, United States	
200 m freestyle	1:54.84		Carl Probert	Fiji	3 June 1999	South Pacific Games	Agana, Guam	
400 m freestyle	4:13.83		Carl Probert	Fiji	7 June 1999	South Pacific Games	Agana, Guam	
800 m freestyle	9:16.48		Carl Probert	-	25 June 1992	Fijian Championships	Fiji	
800 m freestyle	9:15.81	†, not ratified	Temafa Yalimaiwai	Fiji	12 July 2019	Pacific Games	Apia, Samoa	
1500 m freestyle	17:11.51		Carl Probert	Fiji	1995	South Pacific Games	Papeete, French Polynesia	
50 m backstroke	26.97	h	Hansel McCaig	Fiji	29 July 2023 (Note: by official result source; 23 July 2023 by Fiji Swimming source, a typo)	World Championships	Fukuoka, Japan	
100 m backstroke	59.68		Netani Ross	Fiji	11 July 2019	Pacific Games	Apia, Samoa	
200 m backstroke	2:09.64		Carl Probert	Fiji	5 June 1999	South Pacific Games	Agana, Guam	
50m breaststroke	28.54	h	Samuel Yalimaiwai	Fiji	29 July 2025	World Championships	Singapore, Singapore	
50m breaststroke	28.22	h, #	Samuel Yalimaiwai	Fiji	10 May 2026	Oceania Championships	Suva, Fiji	
50m breaststroke	28.11	h, #	Samuel Yalimaiwai	Fiji	26 July 2026	Commonwealth Games	Glasgow, United Kingdom	
100m breaststroke	1:01.76		Taichi Vakasama	Mako	9 April 2022	Fijian Championships	Suva, Fiji	
200m breaststroke	2:12.54		Taichi Vakasama	Mako	8 April 2022	Fijian Championships	Suva, Fiji	
50m butterfly	23.96	b	David Young	Unattached	2 May 2025 (Note: by official result source; 30 April 2025 by Fiji Swimming source, a typo)	TYR Pro Swim Series	Fort Lauderdale, United States	
100m butterfly	57.12	h	Temafa Yalimaiwai	Fiji	21 August 2019	World Junior Championships	Budapest, Hungary	
100m butterfly	55.27	h, #	David Young	Unattached	5 December 2025	U.S. Open	Austin, United States	
200m butterfly	2:08.10		Temafa Yalimaiwai	Marist Brothers High School	31 May 2019	Fiji Schools Championships	Suva, Fiji	
200m individual medley	2:07.84		Taichi Vakasama	Fiji	12 July 2019	Pacific Games	Apia, Samoa	
400m individual medley	4:38.91		Taichi Vakasama	-				
4×50m freestyle relay	1:43.45		Brosnan Erbsleben; Gordon Thompson; William Clard; M. Davison	MAK	23 February 2013	Grand Prix 1	Fiji	
4×100m freestyle relay	3:31.46		Hansel McCaig (51.43); Epeli Rabua (54.22); Temafa Yalimaiwai (54.34); David Young (51.47)	Fiji	30 July 2022	Commonwealth Games	Birmingham, United Kingdom	
4×100m freestyle relay	3:30.55	#	Reuben Taylor (53.49); Hansel McCaig (51.97); David Young (50.84); Che Taito (54.25)	Fiji	10 May 2026	Oceania Championships	Suva, Fiji	
4×200m freestyle relay	8:09.56		Taichi Vakasama (2:00.92); Epeli Rabua; Hansel McCaig; Temafa Yalimaiwai	Fiji	10 July 2019	Pacific Games	Apia, Samoa	
4×50m medley relay	1:54.56			-	25 March 2016	Fiji Championships	Fiji	
4×100m medley relay	3:51.95		Netani Ross; Taichi Vakasama; Temafa Yalimaiwai; Epeli Rabua	Fiji	9 July 2019	Pacific Games	Apia, Samoa	

Legend: # – Record awaiting ratification by Fiji Swimming; WR – World record; OC – Oceanian record; e – equalled existing record;
Records not set in finals: h – heat; sf – semifinal; r – relay 1st leg; rh – relay heat 1st leg; b – B final; † – en route to final mark; so – swim-off; tt – time trial

=== Women ===
Event	Time		Name	Club	Date	Meet	Location	Ref
50m freestyle	25.89		Anahira McCutcheon	Fiji	10 April 2025	Australian Age and MC Age Championships	Australia	
50m freestyle	25.84	h, #	Anahira McCutcheon	Fiji	2 August 2025	World Championships	Singapore, Singapore	
50m freestyle	25.49	#	Anahira McCutcheon	Fiji	12 April 2026	Australian Age Championships	Gold Coast, Australia	
50m freestyle	25.45	h, #	Anahira McCutcheon	Fiji	28 July 2026	Commonwealth Games	Glasgow, United Kingdom	
100m freestyle	56.94	h	Caroline Pickering	Fiji	31 July 2002	Commonwealth Games	Manchester, United Kingdom	
100m freestyle	56.05	#	Anahira McCutcheon	Fiji	16 April 2026	Australian Age Championships	Gold Coast, Australia	
100m freestyle	55.78	h, #	Anahira McCutcheon	Fiji	26 July 2026	Commonwealth Games	Glasgow, United Kingdom	
200m freestyle	2:05.05	h	Matelita Buadromo	Fiji	21 June 2016	Oceania Championships	Suva, Fiji	
400m freestyle	4:29.04		Matelita Buadromo	Dolphins	15 July 2016	Fijian Age Group Championships	Suva, Fiji	
800m freestyle	9:25.23		Matelita Buadromo	Fiji	3 April 2017	New Zealand Championships	Auckland, New Zealand	
1500m freestyle	17:51.90		Matelita Buadromo	Dolphins	15 July 2016	Fijian Age Group Championships	Suva, Fiji	
50m backstroke	29.83		Caroline Puamau	Fiji	7 July 2015	Pacific Games	Port Moresby, Papua New Guinea	
50m backstroke	29.81	#	Anahira McCutcheon	Fiji	16 April 2025	Australian Age Championships	Gold Coast, Australia	
100m backstroke	1:05.11	h	Anahira McCutcheon	Fiji	13 April 2025	Australian Age Championships	Gold Coast, Australia	
100m backstroke	1:04.28	#	Anahira McCutcheon	Fiji	14 April 2025	Australian Age Championships	Gold Coast, Australia	
200m backstroke	2:27.00		Matelita Buadromo	Dolphins	22 January 2016	Anthony Mosse Classic	Auckland, New Zealand	
50m breaststroke	33.14		Kelera Mudunasuoko	Fiji	21 November 2023	Pacific Games	Honiara, Solomon Islands	
50m breaststroke	32.53	#	Anahira McCutcheon	Fiji	14 April 2026	Australian Age Championships	Gold Coast, Australia	
100m breaststroke	1:13.01		Kelera Mudunasuoko	Fiji	23 November 2023	Pacific Games	Honiara, Solomon Islands	
200m breaststroke	2:41.98		Kelera Mudunasuoko	Fiji	20 November 2023	Pacific Games	Honiara, Solomon Islands	
50m butterfly	28.57		Anahira McCutcheon	Fiji	6 April 2024	Australian Age Championships	Australia	
50m butterfly	28.51	not ratified	Caroline Pickering	Fiji	31 August 2007	South Pacific Games	Apia, Samoa	
50m butterfly	27.10	#	Anahira McCutcheon	Fiji	16 April 2026	Australian Age Championships	Gold Coast, Australia	
50m butterfly	27.01	sf, #	Anahira McCutcheon	Fiji	24 July 2026	Commonwealth Games	Glasgow, United Kingdom	
100m butterfly	1:03.91		Caroline Puamau	Dolphins	16 March 2013	-		
100m butterfly	1:03.65	not ratified	Caroline Pickering	Fiji	30 August 2007	South Pacific Games	Apia, Samoa	
100m butterfly	1:01.88	#	Anahira McCutcheon	Fiji	18 April 2026	Australian Age Championships	Gold Coast, Australia	
200m butterfly	2:26.65		Tieri Erasito	Dolphins	20 June 2014	Fijian Age Group Championships	Suva, Fiji	
200m individual medley	2:23.03		Matelita Buadromo	Fiji	12 December 2015	Queensland Championships	Brisbane, Australia	
400m individual medley	5:24.09		Matelita Buadromo	Fiji	6 July 2015	Pacific Games	Port Moresby, Papua New Guinea	
4×50m freestyle relay	1:53.71		E. Nagatelevu; S. Nagatelevu; F. Nagatelevu; Carolina Puamau	BAR	20 April 2007	Fijian Championships	Fiji	
4×100m freestyle relay	3:57.92		Adi Kinisimere Naivalu (1:00.77); Cheyenne Rova (59.91); Caroline Puamau (59.03); Matelita Buadromo (58.21)	Fiji	6 July 2015	Pacific Games	Port Moresby, Papua New Guinea	
4×200m freestyle relay	9:04.06		Matelita Buadromo (2:09.18); Tieri Erasito (2:15.14); Rosemarie Rova (2:20.83); Adi Kinisimere Naivalu (2:18.91)	Fiji	22 June 2016	Oceania Championships	Suva, Fiji	
4×50m medley relay	2:01.37		Matelita Buadromo; T Chung; C Panuve; K Yee	YSS	9 June 2011	Fiji Schools Competition	Fiji	
4×100m medley relay	4:27.78		Cheyenne Rova; Moana Wind; Matelita Buadromo; Yolani Blake	Fiji	9 July 2019	Pacific Games	Apia, Samoa	

Legend: # – Record awaiting ratification by Fiji Swimming; WR – World record; OC – Oceanian record; e – equalled existing record;
Records not set in finals: h – heat; sf – semifinal; r – relay 1st leg; rh – relay heat 1st leg; b – B final; † – en route to final mark; so – swim-off; tt – time trial

=== Mixed relay ===
Event	Time		Name	Club	Date	Meet	Location	Ref
4×50 m freestyle relay	1:39.88		Anahira McCutcheon; Rosemarie Rova; David Young; Hansel McCaig	Fiji	23 November 2023 (Note: by official result source; 20 November 2023 by Fiji Swimming source, a typo)	Pacific Games	Honiara, Solomon Islands	
4×50 m freestyle relay	1:36.83	#	Grace Khelan (26.60); Hansel McCaig (22.81); David Young (22.10); Anahira McCutcheon (25.32)	Fiji	8 May 2026	Oceania Championships	Suva, Fiji	
4×100 m freestyle relay	3:49.95	h	David Young (52.20); Cheyenne Rova (1:03.72); Rosemarie Rova (1:02.35); Hansel McCaig (51.68)	Fiji	29 July 2022	Commonwealth Games	Birmingham, Great Britain	
4×100 m freestyle relay	3:39.18	#	Grace Khelan (59.77); Anahira McCutcheon (56.40); Hansel McCaig (51.67); David Young (51.34)	Fiji	11 May 2026	Oceania Championships	Suva, Fiji	
4×50 m medley relay	1:51.81		Netani Ross; Taichi Vakasama; Matelita Buadromo; Yolani Blake	Fiji	13 July 2019	Pacific Games	Apia, Samoa	
4×50 m medley relay	1:48.59	#	Anahira McCutcheon (30.12); Samuel Yalimaiwai (28.42); David Young (24.07); Grace Khelan (25.98)	Fiji	9 May 2026	Oceania Championships	Suva, Fiji	
4×100 m medley relay	4:17.76		Cheyenne Rova; Epeli Rabua; V. Takayawa; Rosemarie Rova	Fiji	21 June 2016	Oceania Championships	Suva, Fiji	
4×100 m medley relay	4:17.26	not ratified	Tevita Fotofili (1:01.67); Taichi Vakasama (1:03.95); Rosemarie Rova (1:08.40); Jodie-Ana Puamau (1:03.24)	Fiji	26 June 2018	Oceania Championships	Port Moresby, Papua New Guinea	
4×100 m medley relay	4:10.35	#	Anahira McCutcheon; Samuel Yalimaiwai; David Young; Grace Khelan	Fiji	8 May 2026	Oceania Championships	Suva, Fiji	

Legend: # – Record awaiting ratification by Fiji Swimming; WR – World record; OC – Oceanian record; e – equalled existing record;
Records not set in finals: h – heat; so – swim-off

== Short Course (25 m) ==
=== Men ===
Event	Time		Name	Club	Date	Meet	Location	Ref
50m freestyle	20.89	h	David Young	Arizona State University	29 October 2026	World Championship Trials	Westmont, United States	
100m freestyle	47.51	h	David Young	Arizona State University	30 October 2026	World Championship Trials	Westmont, United States	
100m freestyle	49.73	h, not ratified	Hansel McCaig	Fiji	14 December 2022	World Championships	Melbourne, Australia	
200m freestyle	1:56.78		Temafa Yalimaiwai	Tritons	31 August 2019	Grand Prix	Suva, Fiji	
400m freestyle	4:12.16	h	Paul Elaisa	Fiji	14 December 2012	World Championships	Istanbul, Turkey	
800m freestyle	8:56.30		Taichi Vakasama	Nadi Barracudas	22 October 2016	Western Region Age Group Invitational		
1500m freestyle	16:05.26		Taichi Vakasama	Nadi Barracudas	3 September 2016	Grand Prix 2	Fiji	
50m backstroke	25.68		Hansel McCaig	Fiji	30 June 2025	Pacific Mini Games	Koror, Palau	
100m backstroke	58.28		Netani Ross	Mako	11 August 2018	Grand Prix 2	Fiji	
100m backstroke	57.92	r, not ratified	Tevita Fotofili	Fiji	6 October 2018	New Zealand Championships	Auckland, New Zealand	
200m backstroke	2:06.88		Tevita Fotofili	Fiji	5 October 2018	New Zealand Championships	Auckland, New Zealand	
50m breaststroke	27.74		Samuel Yalimaiwai	Fiji	1 July 2025	Pacific Mini Games	Koror, Palau	
100m breaststroke	1:00.74		Taichi Vakasama	Mako	10 October 2019	National Age Group Championships	Suva, Fiji	
100m breaststroke	1:00.60	not ratified	Taichi Vakasama	Mako	22 October 2022	Mini Meet	Suva, Fiji	
200m breaststroke	2:11.02		Taichi Vakasama	Mako	10 October 2019	National Age Group Championships	Suva, Fiji	
50m butterfly	23.11	h	David Young	Fiji	10 December 2024	World Championships	Budapest, Hungary	
100m butterfly	54.95		Hansel McCaig	Fiji	1 July 2025	Pacific Mini Games	Koror, Palau	
200m butterfly	2:07.09		Temafa Yalimaiwai	Tritons	31 August 2019	Grand Prix	Suva, Fiji	
100m individual medley	57.31	h	Hansel McCaig	Fiji	12 December 2024 (Note: by official result source; 10 December 2024 by Fiji Swimming, a typo)	World Championships	Budapest, Hungary	
200m individual medley	2:05.20		Taichi Vakasama	Mako	10 October 2019	National Age Group Championships	Suva, Fiji	
400m individual medley	4:34.70		Taichi Vakasama	Mako	10 October 2019	National Age Group Championships	Suva, Fiji	
4×50m freestyle relay	1:37.68	h, not ratified	Netani Ross (24.93); Taichi Vakasama (24.82); Epeli Rabua (23.74); Eugene Kado (24.19)	Fiji	24 September 2017	Asian Indoor and Martial Arts Games	Ashgabat, Turkmenistan	
4×100m freestyle relay	3:26.73		Reuben Taylor; Livai Raviko; David Young; Hansel McCaig	Fiji	30 June 2025	Pacific Mini Games	Koror, Palau	
4×200m freestyle relay	8:15.48		Thaddeus Kwong; Reuben Taylor; Livai Raviko; Don Younger	Fiji	2 July 2025	Pacific Mini Games	Koror, Palau	
4×50m medley relay	1:45.92	h, not ratified	Netani Ross (26.70); Taichi Vakasama (28.66); Epeli Rabua (26.25); Eugene Kado (24.31)	Fiji	22 September 2017	Asian Indoor and Martial Arts Games	Ashgabat, Turkmenistan	
4×100m medley relay	3:44.06		Thaddeus Kwong; Samuel Yalimaiwai; Hansel McCaig; David Young	Fiji	4 July 2025	Pacific Mini Games	Koror, Palau	

Legend: # – Record awaiting ratification by Fiji Swimming; WR – World record; OC – Oceanian record; e – equalled existing record;
Records not set in finals: h – heat; sf – semifinal; r – relay 1st leg; rh – relay heat 1st leg; b – B final; † – en route to final mark; so – swim-off; tt – time trial

=== Women ===
Event	Time		Name	Club	Date	Meet	Location	Ref
50m freestyle	25.62		Caroline Puamau	Nadi Barracudas	30 November 2007	Fijian Championships	Fiji	
100m freestyle	56.68	h	Caroline Pickering	Fiji	16 March 2000	World Championships	Athens, Greece	
200m freestyle	2:03.64		Matelita Buadromo	Dolphin	10 October 2019	National Age Group Championships	Suva, Fiji	
400m freestyle	4:23.93		Matelita Buadromo	Dolphin	10 October 2019	National Age Group Championships	Suva, Fiji	
800m freestyle	9:20.57		Matelita Buadromo	-	October 2016	Central Region Age Group Invitational	Fiji	
1500m freestyle	17:54.28		Matelita Buadromo	-	October 2016	Central Region Age Group Invitational	Fiji	
50m backstroke	29.30		Yolani Blake	Fiji	2 October 2018	New Zealand Championships	Auckland, New Zealand	
100m backstroke	1:04.13		Matelita Buadromo	Dolphin	10 October 2019	National Age Group Championships	Suva, Fiji	
200m backstroke	2:24.22	h	Marseleima Moss	Fiji	15 December 2024 (Note: by official result source; 10 December 2024 by Fiji Swimming, a typo)	World Championships	Budapest, Hungary	
50m breaststroke	33.19		Moana Wind	Orca	10 October 2019	National Age Group Championships	Suva, Fiji	
100m breaststroke	1:12.57	h	Matelita Buadromo	Fiji	14 December 2018	World Championships	Hangzhou, China	
200m breaststroke	2:40.16		Matelita Buadromo	Tritons	20 August 2011	Grand Prix 2	Fiji	
50m butterfly	25.52		Caroline Pickering	Nadi Barracudas	30 November 2007	Fijian Championships	Fiji	
100m butterfly	1:02.34	h	Matelita Buadromo	Fiji	23 September 2017	Asian Indoor and Martial Arts Games	Ashgabat, Turkmenistan	
200m butterfly	2:22.33	h	Tieri Erasito	Fiji	12 December 2012	World Championships	Istanbul, Turkey	
100m individual medley	1:03.13		Caroline Puamau	Dolphins	10 October 2013	Fijian Age Group Championships	Fiji	
200m individual medley	2:19.19		Matelita Buadromo	Fiji	22 September 2017	Asian Indoor and Martial Arts Games	Ashgabat, Turkmenistan	
400m individual medley	5:17.51		Matelita Buadromo	Dolphins	October 2016	Central Region Age Group Invitational	Fiji	
4×50m freestyle relay	1:52.68		Matelita Buadromo; Keona Saukuru; Salanieta Kunatuba; Tilali Scanlan	Dolphin	10 October 2019	National Age Group Championships	Suva, Fiji	
4×100m freestyle relay	4:08.84		Adele Rova; Cheyenne Rova; Amy McGowan; Caroline Puamau	Nadi Barracudas	5 October 2012	Fijian Age Group Championships	Fiji	
4×200m freestyle relay	9:20.87	Standard						
4×50m medley relay	2:05.79		Salanieta Kunatuba; Tilali Scanlan; Matelita Buadromo; Marseleima Ross	Dolphin	10 October 2019	National Age Group Championships	Suva, Fiji	
4×100m medley relay	4:27.37		Theola Kwong; Kelera Mudunasoko; Vivita Bai; Marseleima Moss	Fiji	4 July 2025	Pacific Mini Games	Koror, Palau	

Legend: # – Record awaiting ratification by Fiji Swimming; WR – World record; OC – Oceanian record; e – equalled existing record;
Records not set in finals: h – heat; sf – semifinal; r – relay 1st leg; rh – relay heat 1st leg; b – B final; † – en route to final mark; so – swim-off; tt – time trial

=== Mixed relay ===
Event	Time		Name	Club	Date	Meet	Location	Ref
4×50 m freestyle relay	1:39.20		Jonalese Vatubua; David Young; Hansel McCaig; Vivita Bai	Fiji	3 July 2025	Pacific Mini Games	Koror, Palau	
4×100 m freestyle relay	3:40.39			Dolphins	22 October 2016	Central Region Invitational	Fiji	
4×200 m freestyle relay	9:47.98			Orcas	10 October 2019	Fijian Age Group Championships	Fiji	
4×50 m medley relay	1:49.68		Theola Kwong; Samuel Yalimaiwai; David Young; Jonalese Vatubua	Fiji	1 July 2025	Pacific Mini Games	Koror, Palau	
4×100 m medley relay	4:49.07	Standard	L. Mara; H. Rabua; L. Chute; M. Philp	Dolphins	27 October 2023	Fijian Age Group Championships		

Legend: # – Record awaiting ratification by Fiji Swimming; WR – World record; OC – Oceanian record; e – equalled existing record;
Records not set in finals: h – heat; so – swim-off
