= List of New Caledonian records in swimming =

The New Caledonian records in swimming are the fastest ever performances of swimmers from New Caledonia, which are maintained by New Caledonia Swimming Association. New Caledonia is no official Fina member.

All records were set in finals unless noted otherwise.

== Long Course (50 m) ==
=== Men ===
| Event | Time | | Name | Club | Date | Meet | Location | Ref |
|---|---|---|---|---|---|---|---|---|
| 50 m freestyle | 23.03 | | Julien Pierre Goyeche | New Caledonia | 13 July 2019 | Pacific Games | Apia, Samoa | |
| 100 m freestyle | 50.46 | r | Florent Janin | New Caledonia | 11 July 2019 | Pacific Games | Apia, Samoa | |
| 200 m freestyle | 1:52.53 | h | Jeremie Dufourmantelle | New Caledonia | 6 July 2015 | Pacific Games | Port Moresby, Papua New Guinea | |
| 400 m freestyle | 4:04.96 | | Jeremie Dufourmantelle | New Caledonia | 8 July 2015 | Pacific Games | Port Moresby, Papua New Guinea | |
| 800 m freestyle | 8:33.83 | † | Jeremie Dufourmantelle | New Caledonia | 11 July 2015 | Pacific Games | Port Moresby, Papua New Guinea | |
| 1500 m freestyle | 16:17.52 | | Jeremie Dufourmantelle | New Caledonia | 11 July 2015 | Pacific Games | Port Moresby, Papua New Guinea | |
| 50m backstroke | 26.42 | | Julien-Pierre Goyetche | - | 2019 | | | |
| 100m backstroke | 58.17 | | Ethan Dumesnil | New Caledonia | 24 November 2023 | Pacific Games | Honiara, Solomon Islands | |
| 200m backstroke | 2:06.83 | | John-William Dabin | New Caledonia | 22 November 2023 | Pacific Games | Honiara, Solomon Islands | |
| 50m breaststroke | 28.38 | | Thomas Oswald | New Caledonia | 11 July 2019 | Pacific Games | Apia, Samoa | |
| 100m breaststroke | 1:04.36 | | Thomas Oswald | New Caledonia | 13 July 2019 | Pacific Games | Apia, Samoa | |
| 200m breaststroke | 2:18.94 | h | Thomas Oswald | New Caledonia | 9 July 2019 | Pacific Games | Apia, Samoa | |
| 50m butterfly | 24.31 | | Ethan Dumesnil | New Caledonia | 23 November 2023 | Pacific Games | Honiara, Solomon Islands | |
| 100m butterfly | 54.09 | | Thibaut Mary | New Caledonia | 10 July 2019 | Pacific Games | Apia, Samoa | |
| 200m butterfly | 2:02.29 | | Thibaut Mary | New Caledonia | 13 July 2019 | Pacific Games | Apia, Samoa | |
| 200m individual medley | 2:03.81 | | John-William Dabin | New Caledonia | 21 November 2023 | Pacific Games | Honiara, Solomon Islands | |
| 400m individual medley | 4:29.99 | | Emmanuel Limozin | New Caledonia | 10 July 2019 | Pacific Games | Apia, Samoa | |
| 4×100m freestyle relay | 3:23.21 | | Florent Janin (50.46); Emmanuel Limozin (49.91); Julien Pierre Goyetche (51.81); Thibaut Mary (51.03) | New Caledonia | 11 July 2019 | Pacific Games | Apia, Samoa | |
| 4×200m freestyle relay | 7:38.51 | | Emmanuel Limozin (1:54.18); Florent Janin; Alex Huet; Thibaut Mary | New Caledonia | 10 July 2019 | Pacific Games | Apia, Samoa | |
| 4×100m medley relay | 3:48.33 | | Julien-Pierre Goyetche; Thomas Oswald; Thibaut Mary; Florent Janin | New Caledonia | 9 July 2019 | Pacific Games | Apia, Samoa | |

Legend: # – Record awaiting ratification by New Caledonia Swimming Association;
Records not set in finals: h – heat; sf – semifinal; r – relay 1st leg; rh – relay heat 1st leg; b – B final; † – en route to final mark; so – swim-off; tt – time trial

=== Women ===
| Event | Time | | Name | Club | Date | Meet | Location | Ref |
|---|---|---|---|---|---|---|---|---|
| 50m freestyle | 26.26 | | Emma Terebo | New Caledonia | 11 July 2015 | Pacific Games | Port Moresby, Papua New Guinea | |
| 100m freestyle | 57.46 | | Emma Terebo | New Caledonia | 6 July 2015 | Pacific Games | Port Moresby, Papua New Guinea | |
| 200m freestyle | 2:03.77 | | Lara Grangeon | New Caledonia | 7 July 2015 | Pacific Games | Port Moresby, Papua New Guinea | |
| 400m freestyle | 4:20.40 | | Lara Grangeon | New Caledonia | 8 July 2015 | Pacific Games | Port Moresby, Papua New Guinea | |
| 800m freestyle | 8:52.99 | | Lara Grangeon | New Caledonia | 9 July 2015 | Pacific Games | Port Moresby, Papua New Guinea | |
| 1500m freestyle | | | | | | | | |
| 50m backstroke | 28.80 | | Emma Terebo | - | 2019 | | | |
| 100m backstroke | 1:02.60 | | Emma Terebo | New Caledonia | 8 July 2015 | Pacific Games | Port Moresby, Papua New Guinea | |
| 200m backstroke | 2:31.51 | | Maiana Flament | New Caledonia | 9 July 2019 | Pacific Games | Apia, Samoa | |
| 50m breaststroke | 32.50 | h | Adeline Williams | New Caledonia | 8 July 2015 | Pacific Games | Port Moresby, Papua New Guinea | |
| 100m breaststroke | 1:11.05 | | Adeline Williams | New Caledonia | 9 July 2015 | Pacific Games | Port Moresby, Papua New Guinea | |
| 200m breaststroke | 2:33.20 | | Lara Grangeon | New Caledonia | 7 July 2015 | Pacific Games | Port Moresby, Papua New Guinea | |
| 50m butterfly | 27.13 | | Diane Bui Duyet | New Caledonia | 29 August 2011 | Pacific Games | Nouméa, New Caledonia | |
| 100m butterfly | 1:00.47 | | Diane Bui Duyet | New Caledonia | August 2011 | Pacific Games | Nouméa, New Caledonia | |
| 200m butterfly | 2:08.66 | | Lara Grangeon | | | | | |
| 200m individual medley | 2:17.84 | | Lara Grangeon | New Caledonia | 10 July 2015 | Pacific Games | Port Moresby, Papua New Guinea | |
| 400m individual medley | 4:47.07 | | Lara Grangeon | New Caledonia | 6 July 2015 | Pacific Games | Port Moresby, Papua New Guinea | |
| 4×100m freestyle relay | 3:58.74 | | Ylenka Maurin (59.82); Anais Toven (59.56); Isla Rogala (1:00.41); May Toven (58.95) | New Caledonia | 23 June 2016 | Oceania Championships | Suva, Fiji | |
| 4×200m freestyle relay | 8:41.52 | | Marine Erout (2:11.41); Maiana Flament (2:11.45); Malou Douillard (2:11.81); Lara Grangeon (2:06.85) | New Caledonia | 21 November 2023 | Pacific Games | Honiara, Solomon Islands | |
| 4×100m medley relay | 4:23.14 | | Lara Grangeon (1:05.35); Manon Baldovini (1:16.05); Lillie Freulon (1:02.54); Malou Douillard (59.20) | New Caledonia | 24 November 2023 | Pacific Games | Honiara, Solomon Islands | |

Legend: # – Record awaiting ratification by New Caledonia Swimming Association;
Records not set in finals: h – heat; sf – semifinal; r – relay 1st leg; rh – relay heat 1st leg; b – B final; † – en route to final mark; so – swim-off; tt – time trial

=== Mixed relay ===
| Event | Time | Name | Club | Date | Meet | Location | Ref |
|---|---|---|---|---|---|---|---|
| 4×50 m freestyle relay | 1:39.79 | Julien Pierre Goyetche; Armelle Hidrio; Emma Terebo; Florent Janin | New Caledonia | 12 July 2019 | Pacific Games | Apia, Samoa | |
| 4×100 m freestyle relay | 3:46.84 | | New Caledonia | 23 May 2014 | Oceania Championships | Auckland, New Zealand | |
| 4×50 m medley relay | 1:49.18 | Emma Terebo; Thomas Oswald; May Toven; Florent Janin | New Caledonia | 13 July 2019 | Pacific Games | Apia, Samoa | |
| 4×100 m medley relay | 4:17.87 | Isla Rogala (1:09.66); Anais Toven (1:18.66); Jeremie Dufourmantelle (57.39); Hugo Ricarrere (52.16) | New Caledonia | 21 June 2016 | Oceania Championships | Suva, Fiji | |

Legend: # – Record awaiting ratification by Papua New Guinea Swimming; WR – World record; OC – Oceanian record;
Records not set in finals: h – heat; so – swim-off

== Short Course (25 m) ==
=== Men ===
| Event | Time | Name | Club | Date | Meet | Location | Ref |
|---|---|---|---|---|---|---|---|
| 50 m freestyle | | | | | | | |
| 100 m freestyle | | | | | | | |
| 200 m freestyle | | | | | | | |
| 400 m freestyle | | | | | | | |
| 800 m freestyle | | | | | | | |
| 1500 m freestyle | | | | | | | |
| 50 m backstroke | | | | | | | |
| 100 m backstroke | | | | | | | |
| 200 m backstroke | | | | | | | |
| 50 m breaststroke | | | | | | | |
| 100 m breaststroke | | | | | | | |
| 200 m breaststroke | | | | | | | |
| 50 m butterfly | | | | | | | |
| 100 m butterfly | | | | | | | |
| 200 m butterfly | | | | | | | |
| 100 m individual medley | | | | | | | |
| 200 m individual medley | | | | | | | |
| 400 m individual medley | | | | | | | |
| 4×50 m freestyle relay | | | | | | | |
| 4×100 m freestyle relay | | | | | | | |
| 4×200 m freestyle relay | | | | | | | |
| 4×50 m medley relay | | | | | | | |
| 4×100 m medley relay | | | | | | | |

Legend: # – Record awaiting ratification by New Caledonia Swimming Association;
Records not set in finals: h – heat; sf – semifinal; r – relay 1st leg; rh – relay heat 1st leg; b – B final; † – en route to final mark; so – swim-off; tt – time trial

=== Women ===
| Event | Time | Name | Club | Date | Meet | Location | Ref |
|---|---|---|---|---|---|---|---|
| 50 m freestyle | | | | | | | |
| 100 m freestyle | | | | | | | |
| 200 m freestyle | | | | | | | |
| 400 m freestyle | | | | | | | |
| 800 m freestyle | | | | | | | |
| 1500 m freestyle | | | | | | | |
| 50 m backstroke | | | | | | | |
| 100 m backstroke | | | | | | | |
| 200 m backstroke | | | | | | | |
| 50 m breaststroke | | | | | | | |
| 100 m breaststroke | | | | | | | |
| 200 m breaststroke | | | | | | | |
| 50 m butterfly | | | | | | | |
| 100 m butterfly | | | | | | | |
| 200 m butterfly | | | | | | | |
| 100 m individual medley | | | | | | | |
| 200 m individual medley | | | | | | | |
| 400 m individual medley | | | | | | | |
| 4×50 m freestyle relay | | | | | | | |
| 4×100 m freestyle relay | | | | | | | |
| 4×200 m freestyle relay | | | | | | | |
| 4×50 m medley relay | | | | | | | |
| 4×100 m medley relay | | | | | | | |

Legend: # – Record awaiting ratification by New Caledonia Swimming Association;
Records not set in finals: h – heat; sf – semifinal; r – relay 1st leg; rh – relay heat 1st leg; b – B final; † – en route to final mark; so – swim-off; tt – time trial
