= List of Marshallese records in swimming =

The Marshallese records in swimming are the fastest ever performances of swimmers from Marshall Islands, which are recognised and ratified by the Marshall Islands Swimming Federation.

All records were set in finals unless noted otherwise.

== Long Course (50 m) ==
=== Men ===
Event	Time		Name	Club	Date	Meet	Location	Ref
50m freestyle	25.13		Loren Lindborg	-	2002			
100m freestyle	55.66		Loren Lindborg	-	2002			
200m freestyle	2:04.91		Loren Lindborg	-	2002			
400m freestyle	4:39.50		Loren Lindborg	-	2002			
800m freestyle	10:25.54	†	Giordan Harris	Marshall Islands	11 July 2015	Pacific Games	Port Moresby, Papua New Guinea	
1500m freestyle	18:42.56		Loren Lindborg	-	2002			
50m backstroke	27.81		Jered Heine	-	2008			
100m backstroke	58.86		Jered Heine	-	2008			
200m backstroke	2:08.88		Jered Heine	-	2003			
50m breaststroke	31.38	h	Troy Kojenlang	Marshall Islands	30 July 2013	World Championships	Barcelona, Spain	
100m breaststroke	1:10.42	h	Troy Kojenlang	Marshall Islands	28 July 2013	World Championships	Barcelona, Spain	
200m breaststroke	2:54.84		Ian Taylor	-	2002			
50m butterfly	27.02		Jered Heine	-	2007			
100m butterfly	57.08		Jered Heine	-	2008			
200m butterfly	2:28.97		Loren Lindborg	-	2002			
200m individual medley	2:14.84		Jered Heine	-	2002			
400m individual medley	4:49.00		Jered Heine	-	2002			
4×100m freestyle relay	3:59.72			-	2002			
4×200m freestyle relay	8:58.03			-	2002			
4×100m medley relay	4:28.82			-	2002			

Legend: # – Record awaiting ratification by Marshall Islands Swimming Federation; WR – World record; OC – Oceanian record;
Records not set in finals: h – heat; sf – semifinal; r – relay 1st leg; rh – relay heat 1st leg; b – B final; † – en route to final mark; tt – time trial

=== Women ===
Event	Time		Name	Club	Date	Meet	Location	Ref
50m freestyle	27.37	c	Colleen Furgeson	Azura Florida Aquatics	30 April 2021	UANA Tokyo Qualifier	Clermont, United States	
100m freestyle	58.71	h	Colleen Furgeson	Marshall Islands	28 July 2021	Olympic Games	Tokyo, Japan	
200m freestyle	2:12.87		Colleen Furgeson	Azura Florida Aquatics	5 June 2021	Annual Summer Kickoff	North Palm Beach, United States	
400m freestyle	5:48.82		Sarah Alves	-	2002			
800m freestyle								
1500m freestyle								
50m backstroke	31.00		Colleen Furgeson	Azura Florida Aquatics	29 April 2021	UANA Tokyo Qualifier	Clermont, United States	
100m backstroke	1:07.33	c	Colleen Furgeson	Azura Florida Aquatics	30 April 2021	UANA Tokyo Qualifier	Clermont, United States	
200m backstroke	2:45.13		Colleen Furgeson	Marshall Islands	28 June 2018	Oceania Championships	Port Moresby, Papua New Guinea	
50m breaststroke	36.97	h	Colleen Furgeson	Marshall Islands	29 July 2017	World Championships	Budapest, Hungary	
100m breaststroke	1:25.47		Clarissa Brady	-	2009			
200m breaststroke								
50m butterfly	29.95	h	Ann-Marie Hepler	Marshall Islands	9 July 2015	Pacific Games	Port Moresby, Papua New Guinea	
100m butterfly	1:11.90	b	Ann-Marie Hepler	Marshall Islands	23 June 2016	Oceania Championships	Suva, Fiji	
200m butterfly	2:46.10		Colleen Furgeson	-	2014			
200m individual medley	2:47.88		Colleen Furgeson	Marshall Islands	12 July 2019	Pacific Games	Apia, Samoa	
400m individual medley	6:36.15		Sarah Alves	-	2002			
4×100m freestyle relay	4:55.62			-	2002			
4×200m freestyle relay	11:02.32			-	2002			
4×100m medley relay				-				

Legend: # – Record awaiting ratification by Marshall Islands Swimming Federation; WR – World record; OC – Oceanian record;
Records not set in finals: h – heat; sf – semifinal; r – relay 1st leg; rh – relay heat 1st leg; b – B final; † – en route to final mark; tt – time trial

== Short Course (25 m) ==
=== Men ===
Event	Time		Name	Club	Date	Meet	Location	Ref
50 m freestyle	24.92	h	Giordan Harris	Marshall Islands	4 December 2014	World Championships	Doha, Qatar	
100 m freestyle	54.84	h	Giordan Harris	Marshall Islands	6 December 2014	World Championships	Doha, Qatar	
200 m freestyle								
400 m freestyle								
800 m freestyle								
1500 m freestyle								
50 m backstroke	30.27	h	Giordan Harris	Marshall Islands	5 December 2014	World Championships	Doha, Qatar	
100 m backstroke								
200 m backstroke								
50 m breaststroke	35.71	h	Giordan Harris	Marshall Islands	15 December 2012	World Championships	Istanbul, Turkey	
100 m breaststroke								
200 m breaststroke								
50 m butterfly	27.54	h	Giordan Harris	Marshall Islands	5 December 2014	World Championships	Doha, Qatar	
100 m butterfly	1:04.09	h	Giordan Harris	Marshall Islands	4 December 2014	World Championships	Doha, Qatar	
200 m butterfly								
100 m individual medley	1:04.43	h	Giordan Harris	Marshall Islands	6 December 2014	World Championships	Doha, Qatar	
200 m individual medley								
400 m individual medley								
4×50 m freestyle relay								
4×100 m freestyle relay								
4×200 m freestyle relay								
4×50 m medley relay								
4×100 m medley relay								

Legend: # – Record awaiting ratification by Marshall Islands Swimming Federation; WR – World record; OC – Oceanian record;
Records not set in finals: h – heat; sf – semifinal; r – relay 1st leg; rh – relay heat 1st leg; b – B final; † – en route to final mark; tt – time trial

=== Women ===
Event	Time		Name	Club	Date	Meet	Location	Ref
50 m freestyle	27.65	h	Colleen Furgeson	Marshall Islands	11 December 2016	World Championships	Windsor, Canada	
100 m freestyle	59.35	h	Colleen Furgeson	Marshall Islands	17 December 2021	World Championships	Abu Dhabi, United Arab Emirates	
200 m freestyle	2:34.03	h	Ruthie Long	Marshall Islands	6 December 2016	World Championships	Windsor, Canada	
400 m freestyle								
800 m freestyle								
1500 m freestyle								
50 m backstroke	29.76	h	Colleen Furgeson	Marshall Islands	19 December 2021	World Championships	Abu Dhabi, United Arab Emirates	
100 m backstroke	1:07.44	h	Colleen Furgeson	Marshall Islands	11 December 2018	World Championships	Hangzhou, China	
200 m backstroke	2:42.62	h	Ruthie Long	Marshall Islands	8 December 2016	World Championships	Windsor, Canada	
50 m breaststroke	35.37	h	Colleen Furgeson	Marshall Islands	6 December 2016	World Championships	Windsor, Canada	
100 m breaststroke	1:22.93	h	Colleen Furgeson	Marshall Islands	9 December 2016	World Championships	Windsor, Canada	
200 m breaststroke								
50 m butterfly	29.20	h	Ann-Marie Hepler	Marshall Islands	24 September 2017	Asian Indoor and Martial Arts Games	Ashgabat, Turkmenistan	
100 m butterfly	1:10.49	h	Ann-Marie Hepler	Marshall Islands	23 September 2017	Asian Indoor and Martial Arts Games	Ashgabat, Turkmenistan	
200 m butterfly								
100 m individual medley	1:10.93	h	Colleen Furgeson	Marshall Islands	8 December 2016	World Championships	Windsor, Canada	
200 m individual medley								
400 m individual medley								
4×50 m freestyle relay								
4×100 m freestyle relay								
4×200 m freestyle relay								
4×50 m medley relay								
4×100 m medley relay								

Legend: # – Record awaiting ratification by Marshall Islands Swimming Federation; WR – World record; OC – Oceanian record;
Records not set in finals: h – heat; sf – semifinal; r – relay 1st leg; rh – relay heat 1st leg; b – B final; † – en route to final mark; tt – time trial
