= 2016 FINA World Swimming Championships (25 m) – Women's 100 metre individual medley =

Women's 100 metre individual medley at the 2016 FINA World Swimming Championships (25 m)
- Venue: WFCU Centre
- Dates: 8 December (heats and semifinals); 9 December (final)
- Competitors: 61 from 50 nations
- Winning time: 57.24

Medalists
gold medal	Katinka Hosszú	Hungary
silver medal	Emily Seebohm	Australia
bronze medal	Alia Atkinson	Jamaica

The Women's 100 metre individual medley competition of the 2016 FINA World Swimming Championships (25 m) was held on 8 and 9 December 2016.

== Records ==
Prior to the competition, the existing world and championship records were as follows.

	Name	Nation	Time	Location	Date
World record	Katinka Hosszú	Hungary	56.67	Netanya	4 December 2015
Championship record	Katinka Hosszú	Hungary	56.70	Doha	5 December 2014

== Results ==
=== Heats ===
The heats were held at 10:23.

Rank	Heat	Lane	Name	Nationality	Time	Notes
1	6	4	Alia Atkinson	Jamaica	58.47	Q
2	7	4	Katinka Hosszú	Hungary	58.87	Q
3	5	4	Emily Seebohm	Australia	59.16	Q
4	5	5	Jenna Laukkanen	Finland	59.67	Q
5	7	3	Lena Kreundl	Austria	59.81	Q
6	7	5	Marrit Steenbergen	Netherlands	59.82	Q
7	2	6	Ella Eastin	United States	1:00.40	Q
8	6	3	Fanny Lecluyse	Belgium	1:00.58	Q, NR
9	5	1	Sarah Darcel	Canada	1:00.70	Q
9	6	6	Susann Bjørnsen	Norway	1:00.70	Q
11	2	0	Yui Ohashi	Japan	1:00.75	Q
12	5	6	Hrafnhildur Lúthersdóttir	Iceland	1:00.79	Q, NR
13	2	1	Lilly King	United States	1:00.84	Q
14	7	2	Evelyn Verrasztó	Hungary	1:00.95	Q
15	7	6	Sun Meichen	China	1:00.99	Q
16	5	3	Fanny Teijonsalo	Finland	1:01.21	Q
17	6	1	Barbora Závadová	Czech Republic	1:01.35	
18	7	7	Chan Kin Lok	Hong Kong	1:01.43	
19	7	1	Jessica Vall	Spain	1:01.73	
20	3	5	Isabella Arcila	Colombia	1:01.98	NR
21	6	2	Kristýna Horská	Czech Republic	1:02.18	
22	6	7	Gabi Grobler	South Africa	1:02.28	
23	5	2	Mathilde Cini	France	1:02.94	
24	5	7	Nina Rangelova	Bulgaria	1:03.01	
25	6	0	Ai Yanhan	China	1:03.05	
26	1	5	Wakaba Tsuyuuchi	Japan	1:03.17	
27	7	0	Johanna Gustafsdottir	Iceland	1:03.51	
28	7	8	Florencia Perotti	Argentina	1:03.57	
29	5	8	Gabriela Ņikitina	Latvia	1:03.72	
30	5	0	Rebecca Kamau	Kenya	1:04.02	
30	7	9	Lushavel Stickland	Samoa	1:04.02	NR
32	5	9	Karen Torrez	Bolivia	1:04.27	NR
33	4	4	Sara Nysted	Faroe Islands	1:05.10	
34	4	6	Hamida Nefsi	Algeria	1:05.34	
35	4	8	Matelita Buadromo	Fiji	1:05.35	
36	2	3	Christie Chue	Singapore	1:05.62	
37	2	5	Anastasia Bogdanovski	Macedonia	1:05.63	NR
38	4	2	Sofia Lopez	Paraguay	1:05.68	NR
39	4	1	Amanda Lim	Singapore	1:05.70	
40	2	8	Chade Nersicio	Curaçao	1:05.77	NR
41	4	3	Nicole Rautemberg	Paraguay	1:05.80	
42	3	4	Naomy Grand'Pierre	Haiti	1:06.11	
43	4	5	Tan Chi Yan	Macau	1:06.30	
44	3	9	Fatima Alkaramova	Azerbaijan	1:06.39	NR
45	4	7	Inés Remersaro	Uruguay	1:06.43	
46	4	9	Izzy Joachim	Saint Vincent and the Grenadines	1:06.61	NR
47	6	9	Cheyenne Rova	Fiji	1:06.81	
48	3	7	Alison Jackson	Cayman Islands	1:09.38	
49	4	0	Estellah Fils Rabetsara	Madagascar	1:10.14	
50	3	1	Sonia Tumiotto	Tanzania	1:10.43	NR
51	2	2	Colleen Furgeson	Marshall Islands	1:10.93	NR
52	3	6	Gabriela Hernandez	Nicaragua	1:11.55	
53	3	2	Jamaris Washshah	United States Virgin Islands	1:11.59	
54	3	3	Christina Linares	Gibraltar	1:11.66	NR
55	1	4	Tilali Scanlan	American Samoa	1:12.11	NR
56	1	3	Melisa Zhdrella	Kosovo	1:12.12	NR
57	2	7	Annie Hepler	Marshall Islands	1:12.62	
58	2	4	Annah Auckburaullee	Mauritius	1:12.81	
59	3	8	Angel de Jesus	Northern Mariana Islands	1:16.88	NR
60	2	9	Charissa Panuve	Tonga	1:18.04	NR
61	3	0	Ammara Pinto	Malawi	1:20.65	NR
	6	5	Mie Nielsen	Denmark		DNS
	6	8	Kylie Masse	Canada		DNS

=== Semifinals ===
The semifinals were held at 19:36.

==== Semifinal 1 ====
Rank	Lane	Name	Nationality	Time	Notes
1	4	Katinka Hosszú	Hungary	57.53	Q
2	3	Marrit Steenbergen	Netherlands	59.33	Q
3	5	Jenna Laukkanen	Finland	59.64	Q
4	2	Susann Bjørnsen	Norway	1:00.05	Q
5	7	Hrafnhildur Lúthersdóttir	Iceland	1:00.31	NR
6	6	Fanny Lecluyse	Belgium	1:00.40	NR
7	1	Evelyn Verrasztó	Hungary	1:00.59	
8	8	Fanny Teijonsalo	Finland	1:01.02	

==== Semifinal 2 ====
Rank	Lane	Name	Nationality	Time	Notes
1	4	Alia Atkinson	Jamaica	58.54	Q
2	5	Emily Seebohm	Australia	58.96	Q
3	6	Ella Eastin	United States	59.67	Q
4	3	Lena Kreundl	Austria	59.86	Q
5	1	Lilly King	United States	1:00.05	QSO, WD
6	2	Sarah Darcel	Canada	1:00.06	
7	7	Yui Ohashi	Japan	1:00.93	
8	8	Sun Meichen	China	1:01.59	

=== Final ===
The final was held at 18:49.

Rank	Lane	Name	Nationality	Time	Notes
1st place, gold medalist(s)	4	Katinka Hosszú	Hungary	57.24	
2nd place, silver medalist(s)	3	Emily Seebohm	Australia	57.97	
3rd place, bronze medalist(s)	5	Alia Atkinson	Jamaica	58.04	
4	6	Marrit Steenbergen	Netherlands	58.81	
5	2	Jenna Laukkanen	Finland	59.00	
6	1	Lena Kreundl	Austria	59.67	NR
7	8	Susann Bjørnsen	Norway	59.89	
8	7	Ella Eastin	United States	59.97	
