= Swimming at the 2011 Pacific Games =

- Location: Nouméa, New Caledonia
- Dates: 29 August – 5 September 2011

Swimming at the 2011 Pacific Games in Nouméa was dominated by the host team New Caledonia who won thirty-three of the forty events contested. The events in the pool – nineteen each for men and women – were held between 29 August and 2 September at the Verlaguet Aquatic Center. The men's and women's open water events were held on Monday 5 September in the waters off Ouvéa Naval Base. All pool events were swum in a long-course (50 metre) pool and the open water events were 5 kilometres in length.

== Event schedule ==
Note: Below are the events by days. Event order presumably was alternate women / men.

Date	Mon. Aug. 29	Tue. Aug. 30	Wed. Aug. 31	Thu. Sep. 1	Fri. Sep. 2
E v e n t s	100 fly (M); 200 breast (M); 200 free (M); 4x100 free relay (M); 200 back (W); 50 fly (W); 800 free (W)	100 breast (M); 400 free (M); 50 back (M); 100 breast (W); 200 free (W); 200 IM (W); 4x200 free relay (W)	100 free (M); 200 fly (M); 200 IM (M); 4x200 free relay (M); 100 fly (W); 200 breast (W); 400 free (W); 50 back (W)	100 back (M); 1500 free (M); 50 breast (M); 50 fly (M); 100 back (W); 200 fly (W); 4x100 free relay (W); 50 free (W)	200 back (M); 400 IM (M); 4x100 medley relay (M); 50 free (M); 100 free (W); 400 IM (W); 4x100 medley relay (W); 50 breast (W)

Monday, September 5: Men's and Women's 5K Open Water swim.

== Medal summary ==
New Caledonia's Lara Grangeon entered all twenty women's events and won a medal in all of them, including sixteen golds. Host country New Caledonia won the gold medal in all women's events.

=== Medal table ===
Rank	Nation	Gold	Silver	Bronze	Total
1	New Caledonia	33	23	13	69
2	Papua New Guinea	5	6	7	18
3	Tahiti	2	4	3	9
4	Fiji	0	4	14	18
5	Tonga	0	2	3	5
6	Guam	0	1	0	1
Totals (6 entries)		40	40	40	120

=== Men ===
Event	Gold		Silver		Bronze	
50m Freestyle	Thomas Dhalia (NCL)	23.45	Ryan Pini (PNG)	23.51	David Thevenot (NCL)	23.56
100m Freestyle	Thomas Dhalia (NCL)	51.53	Ryan Pini (PNG)	51.61	David Thevenot (NCL)	51.62
200m Freestyle	Ryan Pini (PNG)	1:52.40	Thomas Dahlia (NCL)	1:53.09	Hugo Tormento (NCL)	1:55.86
400m Freestyle	Hugo Tormento (NCL)	4:05.67	Olivier Saminadin (NCL)	4:05.91	Hugo Lambert (TAH)	4:08.19 NR
1500m Freestyle	Hugo Tormento (NCL)	16:09.22	Benjamin Schulte (GUM)	16:51.28	Jeremy Verlaguet (NCL)	16:57.17
50m Backstroke	Ryan Pini (PNG)	26.05	Julien-Pierre Goyetche (NCL)	27.16	Dylan Lavorel (NCL)	27.72
100m Backstroke	Ryan Pini (PNG)	56.54	Julien-Pierre Goyetche (NCL)	58.50	Dylan Lavorel (NCL)	59.36
200m Backstroke	Dylan Lavorel (NCL)	2:08.61	Hugo Tormento (NCL)	2:08.69	Paul Elaisa (FIJ)	2:22.87
50m Breaststroke	Rainui Teriipaia (TAH)	28.55 NR	Amini Fonua (TGA)	29.33	Thomas Dahlia (NCL)	29.66
100m Breaststroke	Rainui Teriipaia (TAH)	1:04.81 NR	Thomas Dahlia (NCL)	1:04.88	Amini Fonua (TGA)	1:05.40
200m Breaststroke	Thomas Dahlia (NCL)	2:17.06	Amini Fonua (TGA)	2:24.45	Rainui Teriipaia (TAH)	2:24.74
50m Butterfly	Ryan Pini (PNG)	24.39	David Thevenot (NCL)	25.34	Thomas Chacun (NCL)	25.45
100m Butterfly	Ryan Pini (PNG)	53.93	David Thevenot (NCL)	56.55	Ifalemi Sau-Paea (TGA)	57.18
200m Butterfly	Hugo Tormento (NCL)	2:03.97	Thomas Chacun (NCL)	2:08.13	Ifalemi Sau-Paea (TGA)	2:09.96
200m I.M.	Thomas Dahlia (NCL)	2:07.15	Olivier Saminadin (NCL)	2:09.89	Paul Elaisa (FIJ)	2:24.25
400m I.M	Hugo Tormento (NCL)	4:38.25	Olivier Saminadin (NCL)	4:43.04	Heimanu Sichan (TAH)	4:53.66
4 × 100 m Freestyle relay	New Caledonia; Julien-Pierre Goyetche; Bryan Spitz; David Thevenot; Thomas Dahlia	3:27.81	Tahiti; Heimanu Sichan; Rainui Teriipaia; Anthony Clark; Hugo Lambert	3:37.50	Fiji; William Clark; Douglas Miller; Paul Elaisa; Carl Probert	3:41.16 NR
4 × 200 m Freestyle relay	New Caledonia; Romain Berthaud; Hugo Tormento; Thomas Dahlia; Olivier Saminadin	7:54.64	Tahiti; Heimanu Sichan; Rainui Teriipaia; Anthony Clark; Hugo Lambert	8:14.08	Fiji; Douglas Miller; Carl Probert; Elaijie Erasito; Paul Elaisa	8:29.86 NR
4 × 100 m Medley relay	New Caledonia; Dylan Lavorel; Thomas Dahlia; David Thevenot; Julien-Pierre Goyetche	3:53.53	Tahiti; Heimanu Sichan; Rainui Teriipaia; Hugo Lambert; Anthony Clark	4:05.60	Papua New Guinea; Ryan Pini; Ian Nakmai; Peter Pokawin; Nathan Ampa'Oi	4:07.63
5K Open Water (time= h:min:s)	Hugo Tormento (NCL)	1:00:35	Heimanu Sichan (TAH)	1:02:31	Damon Theveny (NCL)	1:02:32

=== Women ===
Event	Gold		Silver		Bronze	
50m Freestyle	Adeline Williams (NCL)	26.77	Anna Liza Mopio (PNG)	26.93	Lara Grangeon (NCL)	27.24
100m Freestyle	Lara Grangeon (NCL)	58.65	Armelle Hidrio (NCL)	58.71	Anna Liza Mopio (PNG)	59.80
200m Freestyle	Lara Grangeon (NCL)	2:08.47	Anna Liza Mopio (PNG)	2:10.48	Matelita Buadromo (FIJ)	2:12.27
400m Freestyle	Lara Grangeon (NCL)	4:30.33	Charlotte Robin (NCL)	4:39.79	Tieri Erasito (FIJ)	4:51.08
800m Freestyle	Lara Grangeon (NCL)	9:05.84	Charlotte Robin (NCL)	9:40.16	Tieri Erasito (FIJ)	10:15.16
50m Backstroke	Lara Grangeon (NCL)	31.01	Anna Liza Mopio (PNG)	31.08	Suzanne Afchain (NCL)	31.53
100m Backstroke	Lara Grangeon (NCL)	1:06.68	Anna Liza Mopio (PNG)	1:09.01	Delphine Bui Duyet (NCL)	1:10.30
200m Backstroke	Lara Grangeon (NCL)	2:20.78	Suzanne Afchain (NCL)	2:27.94	Anna Liza Mopio (PNG)	2:33.28
50m Breaststroke	Adeline Williams (NCL)	34.30	Lara Grangeon (NCL)	34.40	Matelita Buadromo (FIJ)	35.19
100m Breaststroke	Lara Grangeon (NCL)	1:13.07	Adeline Williams (NCL)	1:14.51	Matelita Buadromo (FIJ)	1:17.16
200m Breaststroke	Lara Grangeon (NCL)	2:36.57	Adeline Williams (NCL)	2:43.24	Matelita Buadromo (FIJ)	2:53.63
50m Butterfly	Diane Bui Duyet (NCL)	27.13	Lara Grangeon (NCL)	28.68	Anna Liza Mopio (PNG)	30.64
100m Butterfly	Diane Bui Duyet (NCL)	1:00.47	Lara Grangeon (NCL)	1:05.18	Tieri Erasito (FIJ)	1:07.37
200m Butterfly	Lara Grangeon (NCL)	2:17.84	Tieri Erasito (FIJ)	2:28.59	Laurene Gosse (NCL)	2:32.48
200m I.M.	Lara Grangeon (NCL)	2:22.19	Armelle Hidrio (NCL)	2:34.25	Skye Eden (FIJ)	2:35.87
400m I.M	Lara Grangeon (NCL)	5:01.68	Delphine Bui Duyet (NCL)	5:24.49	Susau Elaisa (FIJ)	6:02.84
4 × 100 m Freestyle relay	New Caledonia; Diane Bui Duyet; Lara Grangeon; Suzanne Afchain; Armelle Hidrio	4:01.95	Fiji; Adele Rova; Cheyenne Rova; Susau Elaisa; Skye Eden	4:11.80	Papua New Guinea; Judith Meauri; Barbara Vali; Teagan McCarthy; Anna Liza Mopio	4:13.64
4 × 200 m Freestyle relay	New Caledonia; Suzanne Afchain; Lara Grangeon; Charlotte Robin; Armelle Hidrio	8:52.11	Fiji; Tieri Erasito; Skye Eden; Susau Elaisa; Matelita Buadromo	9:20.87	Papua New Guinea; Barbara Vali; Judith Meauri; Tegan McCarthy; Anna Liza Mopio	9:44.28
4 × 100 m Medley relay	New Caledonia; Lara Grangeon; Adeline Williams; Diane Bui Duyet; Armelle Hidrio	4:25.51	Fiji; Cheyenne Rova; Matelita Buadromo; Tieri Erasito; Skye Eden	4:41.45 NR	Papua New Guinea; Anna Liza Mopio; Barbara Vali; Tegan McCarthy; Judith Meauri	4:48.34
5K Open Water (time= h:min:s)	Lara Grangeon (NCL)	1:02:38	Charlotte Robin (NCL)	1:05:31	Susau Elaisa (FIJ)	1:14:13

== Participating countries ==
88 swimmers from 11 countries were entered in the swimming events at the 2011 Games. The teams entered in swimming were:

- American Samoa (1)
- Fiji (11)
- Guam (9)
- Marshall Islands (3)
- (Federated States of Micronesia) Micronesia (3)
- New Caledonia (36)
- Palau (6)
- Papua New Guinea (12)
- Tahiti (3)
- Tokelau (1)
- Tonga (3)

== Sources ==
- 2011 Pacific Games Results. Oceania Sport Information Centre (Report). Archived from the original on 31 October 2015.
