= List of American Samoan records in swimming =

The American Samoa records in swimming are the fastest ever performances of swimmers from American Samoa, which are recognised and ratified by the American Samoa Swimming Association (ASSA).

All records were set in finals unless noted otherwise.

== Long Course (50 m) ==
=== Men ===
Event	Time		Name	Club	Date	Meet	Location	Ref
50 m freestyle	23.75	h	Micah Masei	American Samoa	22 November 2023	Pacific Games	Honiara, Solomon Islands	
100 m freestyle	55.30	h	Daniel Tamatoa Hardman	American Samoa	8 July 2015	Pacific Games	Port Moresby, Papua New Guinea	
200 m freestyle								
400 m freestyle	5:05.88		Benjamin Gabbard	-	2009			
800 m freestyle								
1500 m freestyle								
50 m backstroke	28.58	h	Daniel Tamatoa Hardman	American Samoa	6 July 2015	Pacific Games	Port Moresby, Papua New Guinea	
100 m backstroke	1:03.86		Benjamin Gabbard	-	2009			
200 m backstroke	2:20.25		Benjamin Gabbard	-	2009			
50 m breaststroke	28.86	h, †	Micah Masei	American Samoa	21 July 2019	World Championships	Gwangju, South Korea	
100 m breaststroke	1:04.93	h	Micah Masei	American Samoa	24 July 2021	Olympic Games	Tokyo, Japan	
200 m breaststroke	3:29.10		Robert Scanlan	-	2007			
50 m butterfly	27.15	h	Daniel Tamatoa Hardman	American Samoa	9 July 2015	Pacific Games	Port Moresby, Papua New Guinea	
100 m butterfly	1:00.87		Benjamin Gabbard	-	2009			
200 m butterfly	2:18.37		Benjamin Gabbard	-	2009			
200 m individual medley	2:19.88		Benjamin Gabbard	-	2009			
400 m individual medley	5:05.88		Benjamin Gabbard	-	2009			
4×100 m freestyle relay	4:32.02			-	2007			
4×200 m freestyle relay	10:52.14			-	2007			
4×100 m medley relay	5:47.73			-	2007			

Legend: # – Record awaiting ratification by American Samoa Swimming Association; WR – World record; OC – Oceanian record;
Records not set in finals: h – heat; sf – semifinal; r – relay 1st leg; rh – relay heat 1st leg; b – B final; † – en route to final mark; tt – time trial

=== Women ===
Event	Time		Name	Club	Date	Meet	Location	Ref
50m freestyle	26.46		Megan Fonteno	-	2011			
100m freestyle	57.34		Megan Fonteno	-	2011			
200m freestyle								
400m freestyle	5:12.26		Lelei Fonoiomoana	-	1975			
800m freestyle								
1500m freestyle								
50m backstroke	34.5		Lelei Fonoiomoana	-	1971			
100m backstroke	1:10.29		Lelei Fonoiomoana	-	1973			
200m backstroke	2:42.40		Lelei Fonoiomoana	-	1974			
50m breaststroke	33.98		Tilali Scanlan	American Samoa	11 July 2019	Pacific Games	Apia, Samoa	
100m breaststroke	1:10.01	h	Tilali Scanlan	American Samoa	25 July 2021	Olympic Games	Tokyo, Japan	
200m breaststroke	2:49.98	h	Tilali Scanlan	American Samoa	9 July 2019	Pacific Games	Apia, Samoa	
50m butterfly	29.48		Lelei Fonoiomoana	-	1976			
100m butterfly	1:01.95		Lelei Fonoiomoana	-	1976			
200m butterfly	2:27.38		Lelei Fonoiomoana	-	1976			
200m individual medley	2:26.65		Loreen Whitfield	-				
400m individual medley	5:12.25		Lelei Fonoiomoana	-	1976			
4×100m freestyle relay								
4×200m freestyle relay								
4×100m medley relay								

Legend: # – Record awaiting ratification by American Samoa Swimming Association; WR – World record; OC – Oceanian record;
Records not set in finals: h – heat; sf – semifinal; r – relay 1st leg; rh – relay heat 1st leg; b – B final; † – en route to final mark; tt – time trial

== Short Course (25 m) ==
=== Men ===
Event	Time	Name	Club	Date	Meet	Location	Ref
50 m freestyle							
100 m freestyle							
200 m freestyle							
400 m freestyle							
800 m freestyle							
1500 m freestyle							
50 m backstroke							
100 m backstroke							
200 m backstroke							
50 m breaststroke							
100 m breaststroke							
200 m breaststroke							
50 m butterfly							
100 m butterfly							
200 m butterfly							
100 m individual medley							
200 m individual medley							
400 m individual medley							
4×50 m freestyle relay							
4×100 m freestyle relay							
4×200 m freestyle relay							
4×50 m medley relay							
4×100 m medley relay							

Legend: # – Record awaiting ratification by American Samoa Swimming Association; WR – World record; OC – Oceanian record;
Records not set in finals: h – heat; sf – semifinal; r – relay 1st leg; rh – relay heat 1st leg; b – B final; † – en route to final mark; tt – time trial

=== Women ===
Event	Time		Name	Club	Date	Meet	Location	Ref
50 m freestyle								
100 m freestyle								
200 m freestyle								
400 m freestyle								
800 m freestyle								
1500 m freestyle								
50m backstroke	34.70	h	Tilali Scanlan	American Samoa	9 December 2016	World Championships	Windsor, Canada	
100 m backstroke								
200 m backstroke								
50m breaststroke	33.19	h	Tilali Scanlan	American Samoa	11 December 2018	World Championships	Hangzhou, China	
100m breaststroke	1:12.72	h	Tilali Scanlan	American Samoa	14 December 2018	World Championships	Hangzhou, China	
200 m breaststroke								
50 m butterfly								
100 m butterfly								
200 m butterfly								
100m individual medley	1:12.11	h	Tilali Scanlan	American Samoa	8 December 2016	World Championships	Windsor, Canada	
200 m individual medley								
400 m individual medley								
4×50 m freestyle relay								
4×100 m freestyle relay								
4×200 m freestyle relay								
4×50 m medley relay								
4×100 m medley relay								

Legend: # – Record awaiting ratification by American Samoa Swimming Association; WR – World record; OC – Oceanian record;
Records not set in finals: h – heat; sf – semifinal; r – relay 1st leg; rh – relay heat 1st leg; b – B final; † – en route to final mark; tt – time trial
