= List of Solomon Islands records in swimming =

The Solomon Islands records in swimming are the fastest ever performances of swimmers from Solomon Islands, which are recognised and ratified by the Solomon Islands Swimming Federation.

All records were set in finals unless noted otherwise.

== Long Course (50 m) ==
=== Men ===
Event	Time		Name	Club	Date	Meet	Location	Ref
50 m freestyle	27.07	h	Clayment Lafiara	Solomon Islands	9 April 2018	Commonwealth Games	Gold Coast, Australia	
100 m freestyle	1:00.13	h	Edgar Iro	Solomon Islands	27 July 2021	Olympic Games	Tokyo, Japan	
200 m freestyle								
400 m freestyle								
800 m freestyle								
1500 m freestyle								
50 m backstroke								
100 m backstroke								
200 m backstroke								
50 m breaststroke	37.52	h	Clayment Bill Lafiara	Solomon Islands	8 July 2015	Pacific Games	Port Moresby, Papua New Guinea	
100 m breaststroke								
200 m breaststroke								
50 m butterfly	29.40	h	Edgar Iro	Solomon Islands	21 July 2019	World Championships	Gwangju, South Korea	
100 m butterfly								
200 m butterfly								
200 m individual medley								
400 m individual medley								
4×100 m freestyle relay								
4×200 m freestyle relay								
4×100 m medley relay								

Legend: # – Record awaiting ratification by Solomon Islands Swimming Federation; WR – World record; OC – Oceanian record;
Records not set in finals: h – heat; sf – semifinal; r – relay 1st leg; rh – relay heat 1st leg; b – B final; † – en route to final mark; so – swim-off; tt – time trial

=== Women ===
Event	Time		Name	Club	Date	Meet	Location	Ref
50 m freestyle	33.94	h	Wendy Lagwena	Solomon Islands	13 July 2019	Pacific Games	Apia, Samoa	
100 m freestyle	1:23.29	h	Evalyn Tome	Solomon Islands	12 July 2019	Pacific Games	Apia, Samoa	
200 m freestyle								
400 m freestyle								
800 m freestyle								
1500 m freestyle								
50m backstroke								
100m backstroke								
200 m backstroke								
50m breaststroke	43.84	h	Evalyn Tome	Solomon Islands	11 July 2019	Pacific Games	Apia, Samoa	
100 m breaststroke								
200 m breaststroke								
50m butterfly								
100 m butterfly								
200 m butterfly								
200m individual medley								
400 m individual medley								
4×100 m freestyle relay								
4×200 m freestyle relay								
4×100 m medley relay								

Legend: # – Record awaiting ratification by Solomon Islands Swimming Federation; WR – World record; OC – Oceanian record;
Records not set in finals: h – heat; sf – semifinal; r – relay 1st leg; rh – relay heat 1st leg; b – B final; † – en route to final mark; so – swim-off; tt – time trial

== Short Course (25 m) ==
=== Men ===
Event	Time		Name	Club	Date	Meet	Location	Ref
50m freestyle	26.52	h	Edgar Iro	Solomon Islands	18 December 2021	World Championships	Abu Dhabi, United Arab Emirates	
100m freestyle	57.90	h	Edgar Iro	Solomon Islands	20 December 2021	World Championships	Abu Dhabi, United Arab Emirates	
200 m freestyle								
400 m freestyle								
800 m freestyle								
1500 m freestyle								
50 m backstroke								
100 m backstroke								
200 m backstroke								
50m breaststroke	33.37	h	Clayment Lafiara	Solomon Islands	15 December 2018	World Championships	Hangzhou, China	
100 m breaststroke								
200 m breaststroke								
50 m butterfly								
100 m butterfly								
200 m butterfly								
100 m individual medley								
200 m individual medley								
400 m individual medley								
4×50 m freestyle relay								
4×100 m freestyle relay								
4×200 m freestyle relay								
4×50 m medley relay								
4×100 m medley relay								

Legend: # – Record awaiting ratification by Solomon Islands Swimming Federation; WR – World record; OC – Oceanian record;
Records not set in finals: h – heat; sf – semifinal; r – relay 1st leg; rh – relay heat 1st leg; b – B final; † – en route to final mark; so – swim-off; tt – time trial

=== Women ===
Event	Time		Name	Club	Date	Meet	Location	Ref
50m freestyle	34.16	h	Wendy Charles	Solomon Islands	15 December 2018	World Championships	Hangzhou, China	
100m freestyle	1:19.98	h	Evalyn Tome	Solomon Islands	12 December 2018	World Championships	Hangzhou, China	
200 m freestyle								
400 m freestyle								
800 m freestyle								
1500 m freestyle								
50 m backstroke								
100 m backstroke								
200 m backstroke								
50m breaststroke	43.12	h	Wendy Charles	Solomon Islands	11 December 2018	World Championships	Hangzhou, China	
100 m breaststroke								
200 m breaststroke								
50 m butterfly								
100 m butterfly								
200 m butterfly								
100 m individual medley								
200 m individual medley								
400 m individual medley								
4×50 m freestyle relay								
4×100 m freestyle relay								
4×200 m freestyle relay								
4×50 m medley relay								
4×100 m medley relay								

Legend: # – Record awaiting ratification by Solomon Islands Swimming Federation; WR – World record; OC – Oceanian record;
Records not set in finals: h – heat; sf – semifinal; r – relay 1st leg; rh – relay heat 1st leg; b – B final; † – en route to final mark; so – swim-off; tt – time trial
