= Meli Malani =

Fijian swimmer

Personal information
- Born: 17 November 1996 (age 29) Nabukadra, Fiji

Sport
- Sport: Swimming
Medal record
Men's swimming
Representing Fiji
Pacific Games
Silver medal – second place	2015 Port Moresby	4x50 m mixed free relay
Bronze medal – third place	2015 Port Moresby	4x50 m mixed medley relay
Oceania Championships
Bronze medal – third place	2016 Suva	50 m breaststroke

Meli Malani (born 17 November 1996) is a Fijian swimmer. He competed in the men's 50 metre freestyle event at the 2016 Summer Olympics.
