= Wilrich Coetzee =

New Zealand swimmer

Personal information
- Nationality: New Zealand
- Born: 20 May 1997 (age 29)

Sport
- Sport: Swimming
Medal record
Men's swimming
Representing New Zealand
Oceania Championships
Gold medal – first place	2016 Suva	200 m butterfly
Gold medal – first place	2016 Suva	200 m medley
Gold medal – first place	2018 Port Moresby	200 m butterfly
Silver medal – second place	2018 Port Moresby	50 m butterfly
Silver medal – second place	2018 Port Moresby	100 m butterfly
Bronze medal – third place	2016 Suva	100 m butterfly

Wilrich Coetzee (born 20 May 1997) is a New Zealand swimmer. He competed in the men's 200 metre butterfly event at the 2018 FINA World Swimming Championships (25 m), in Hangzhou, China.
