= Ryan Maskelyne =

Australian-born Papua New Guinean swimmer

Personal information
- Nationality: Australia; Papua New Guinea
- Born: 25 January 1999 (age 27) Grafton, New South Wales, Australia
- Spouse: Laura Moloney

Sport
- Sport: Swimming
- Strokes: Breaststroke
Medal record
Men's swimming
Representing Papua New Guinea
Pacific Games
| Silver medal – second place | 2015 Port Moresby | 200 m breaststroke |
| Silver medal – second place | 2015 Port Moresby | 4 × 100 m medley relay |
| Silver medal – second place | 2019 Apia | 200 m breaststroke |
| Bronze medal – third place | 2019 Apia | 100 m breaststroke |

Ryan Campbell Maskelyne (born 25 January 1999) is a Papua New Guinean swimmer. He competed in the men's 200 metre breaststroke at the 2020 Summer Olympics.
