= Adele Rova =

Fijian swimmer

Personal information
- National team: Fiji
- Born: 2 May 1996 (age 30)

Sport
- Sport: Swimming
- College team: Keiser Seahawks

Adele Rova (born 2 May 1996) is a Fijian swimmer. She competed at the 2009 World Aquatics Championships (50 metre backstroke, 100 metre breaststroke, 50 metre breaststroke, 50 metre butterfly, 100 metre butterfly, 50 metre freestyle). She won silver with her team at the 2011 Pacific Games in the 4×100 metres freestyle relay event.

She is a sister of Cheyenne Rova.

== See also ==
- List of Fijian records in swimming
