= Judith Meauri =

Papua New Guinean swimmer

Personal information
- Nationality: Papua New Guinea
- Born: 5 April 1992 (age 34) Port Moresby, Papua New Guinea
- Height: 1.61 m (5 ft 3 in)
- Weight: 55 kg (121 lb)

Sport
- Sport: Swimming
Medal record
Women's swimming
Representing Papua New Guinea
Pacific Games
Bronze medal – third place	2011 Nouméa	4x100m Freestyle Relay
Bronze medal – third place	2011 Nouméa	4x200m Freestyle Relay
Bronze medal – third place	2011 Nouméa	4x100m Medley Relay

Judith Meauri (born 5 April 1992) is a Papua New Guinean swimmer. She is a two-time Olympian, having competed in 2012 and 2020.

== Life ==
She was born in Port Moresby.

Meauri competed in swimming at the 2011 Pacific Games with the Papua New Guinean team, where she won a bronze medal in 4x100m freestyle relay, a bronze medal in 4x200m freestyle relay, and a bronze medal in 4x100m medley relay.

She competed in the women's 50m freestyle at the 2012 Summer Olympics in London, finishing with a time of 27.84 seconds in 47th place in the heats. She competed at the 2020 Summer Olympics, in Women's 50 m freestyle.

Before the 2020 Olympics, she was part of a FINA-sponsored extended camp. At the 2020 Summer Olympics, she again competed in the women's 50 m freestyle, winning heat 4 of the first round.

As of May 2026, she holds the women's 400 m freestyle national record, a time of 5:23.38.
