= Samuel Seghers =

Papua New Guinean swimmer

Personal information
- Full name: Samuel Mai Seghers
- Nickname: MaiMai
- Nationality: Papua New Guinea
- Born: 12 September 1994 (age 31) Papua New Guinea
- Height: 1.90 m (6 ft 3 in)
- Weight: 83 kg (183 lb)

Sport
- Sport: Swimming
- Strokes: Freestyle, Butterfly
- Club: Acacia Bayside /Boroko Swim club
Medal record
South Pacific Games
Gold medal – first place	2015 Port Moresby	4×50 m mixed freestyle
Silver medal – second place	2015 Port Moresby	100 m butterfly
Silver medal – second place	2015 Port Moresby	4×100 m medley
Silver medal – second place	2015 Port Moresby	4×50 m mixed medley
Bronze medal – third place	2015 Port Moresby	4×100 m freestyle
Bronze medal – third place	2015 Port Moresby	4×200 m freestyle
Oceania Championships
Bronze medal – third place	2016 Suva	200 m freestyle
Bronze medal – third place	2016 Suva	4×100 m medley
Bronze medal – third place	2016 Suva	4×50 m mixed medley

Samuel Seghers (born 12 September 1994) is a Papua New Guinean swimmer. Samuel trained under Shaun Crow at Acacia Bayside and late Rackely Hibiscus. He made his major debut for Papua New Guinea at the 2015 Pacific Games and later traveled to Kazan, Russia for the 2015 World Aquatics Championships. other notable competitions include 2016 Fina World Championships (Canada), 2018 Commonwealth Games (Gold Coast), 2018 Fina World Championships (Doha), 2019 Pacific Games (Samoa), 2019 World Championships (South Korea).
