= Tegan McCarthy =

Papua New Guinean swimmer

Personal information
- Nationality: Papua New Guinea
- Born: 1997 (age 28–29)

Sport
- Sport: Swimming
Medal record
Women's swimming
Representing Papua New Guinea
Pacific Games
| Silver medal – second place | 2015 Port Moresby | 200 m breaststroke |
| Silver medal – second place | 2015 Port Moresby | 4x100 m medley relay |
| Bronze medal – third place | 2011 Nouméa | 4x100 m free relay |
| Bronze medal – third place | 2011 Nouméa | 4x200 m free relay |
| Bronze medal – third place | 2011 Nouméa | 4x100 m medley relay |
- Updated on 24 August 2016

Tegan McCarthy (born 1997) is a Papua New Guinean swimmer. She competed in the 4 × 100 m, 4 × 200 m freestyle relays, and the 4 × 100 medley relay at the 2011 Pacific Games, capturing bronze in all three events, and in the 50 m, 100 m and 200 m breaststroke, 50 m (where she holds the national record with a time of 32.27 seconds) and 100 m backstroke (with a Papua New Guinea record of 1:12.61), 50 m butterfly (an event where she broke the national record ) and 100 m individual medley events at the 2012 FINA World Swimming Championships (25 m). McCarthy also competed in the 50 m breaststroke and 50 m butterfly events at the 2013 World Aquatics Championships.
