= David Young (Fijian swimmer) =

Fijian Swimmer

Personal information
- Nickname: Tolu
- Nationality: Fijian
- Born: 23 March 2005 (age 21)

Sport
- Sport: Swimming
- College team: Arizona State University
Medal record
Men's swimming
Representing Fiji
Event	1st	2nd	3rd
Pacific Games	0	3	0
Commonwealth Youth Games	0	0	1
Total	0	3	1
Pacific Games
Silver medal – second place	2023 Honiara	50 m freestyle
Silver medal – second place	2023 Honiara	4×50 m mixed freestyle
Silver medal – second place	2023 Honiara	4×50 m mixed medley
Commonwealth Youth Games
Bronze medal – third place	2023 Trinidad & Tobago	50 m butterfly

David "Tolu" Young (born 23 March 2005) is a Fijian swimmer. He specializes in sprint freestyle events.

== Career ==
Young attended international school suva in Fiji and then later Curtis High School in Washington, being a state champion and the state record holder in the 50 m freestyle.

In 2023, Young committed to swim collegiately at Arizona State University.

On 4 July 2024, the Fiji Association of Sports and National Olympic Committee (FASANOC) announced that Young would be representing Fiji at the 2024 Olympic Games in Paris, France.

Young went on to win heat 5 of the Men's 50m Freestyle in a new national record time of 22.71 seconds, but failed to qualify for the semi-finals.

At the 2026 Commonwealth Games in Glasgow, Scotland, Young became the first Fijian swimmer to qualify for a Commonwealth Games final.

== Personal life ==
Young was born to an American father and a Fijian mother. He spent his childhood in Fiji before moving to the United States in 2019.

== Personal bests ==
As of 9 December 2025; All bests set in a long course (50-meter) pool unless otherwise noted.

Event	TIme	Meet	Date	Note(s)
50 m Freestyle	21.92	2025 US Open Championships	4 December 2025	NR
100 m Freestyle	49.38	2025 US Open Championships	6 December 2025	NR
50 m Breaststroke	30.76	22nd Commonwealth Games 2022	1 August 2022	
100 m Breastsroke	1:08.99	TYR Pro Swim Series San Antonio 2022	31 March 2022	
50 m Butterfly	23.96	TYR Pro Swim Series Fort Lauderdale 2025	2 May 2025	NR
100 m Butterfly	55.27	2025 US Open Championships	5 December 2025	NR
Men 4x100 Freestyle Relay	3:31.46	22nd Commonwealth Games 2022	30 July 2022	NR
Men 4x200 Freestyle Relay	8:27.20	17th Pacific Games 2023	21 November 2023	
Men 4x100 Medley Relay	3:55.31	22nd Commonwealth Games 2022	3 August 2022	
Mixed 4x100 Freestyle Relay	3:49.95	22nd Commonwealth Games 2022	29 July 2022	

Legend:NR – Fijian record;
