= Hugo Lambert =

French Polynesian swimmer

Personal information
- Born: 1993 or 1994 (age 31–32)

Sport
- Country: French Polynesia
- Sport: Swimming
Medal record
Men's swimming
Representing Tahiti
Pacific Games
Gold medal – first place	2015 Port Moresby	4 × 100m freestyle relay
Gold medal – first place	2015 Port Moresby	4 × 200m freestyle relay
Gold medal – first place	2015 Port Moresby	4 × 100m medley relay
Silver medal – second place	2015 Port Moresby	200m Freestyle
Silver medal – second place	2015 Port Moresby	400m Freestyle
Bronze medal – third place	2015 Port Moresby	50m Freestyle
Bronze medal – third place	2015 Port Moresby	100m Freestyle
Bronze medal – third place	2015 Port Moresby	50m Butterfly
Silver medal – second place	2011 Nouméa	4 × 100m freestyle relay
Silver medal – second place	2011 Nouméa	4 × 200m freestyle relay
Silver medal – second place	2011 Nouméa	4 × 100m medley relay
Bronze medal – third place	2011 Nouméa	400m Freestyle

Hugo Lambert (born 1993 or 1994) is a French Polynesian swimmer who has represented French Polynesia at the Pacific Games.

Lambert began swimming at the age of 11. At the age of 15 he moved to France to compete with CN Chalon.

At the 2015 Pacific Games in Port Moresby he won three gold medals in the relays, two silvers in the 200m and 400m freestyle, and three bronze in the 50m and 100m freestyle and 50m butterfly.
