= Diane Lacombe =

French swimmer

Personal information
- Born: 4 November 1976
- Died: 25 July 1999 (aged 22)

Sport
- Sport: Swimming

Diane Lacombe (4 November 1976 – 25 July 1999) was a French backstroke swimmer who competed in the 1992 Summer Olympics.
