= Megan Fonteno =

American Samoan professional swimmer

Personal information
- Nationality: (American Samoa) American Samoan
- Born: March 5, 1993 (age 33) Okinawa, Okinawa Prefecture, Japan
- Height: 1.62 m (5 ft 4 in)
- Weight: 61 kg (134 lb)

Sport
- Sport: Swimming
- Strokes: Freestyle

Megan Fonteno (born 5 March 1993 in Okinawa, Japan) is an American Samoan professional swimmer. She qualified for the 2012 Summer Olympics in London at the 100 m freestyle event. She came 26th in the world.
