= Matelita Buadromo =

Fijian swimmer (born 1996)

Personal information
- Born: 15 January 1996 (age 30) Suva
- Height: 1.75 m (5 ft 9 in)
- Weight: 72 kg (159 lb)

Sport
- Country: Fiji
- Sport: Swimming
- Coached by: Sharon Pickering Smith

Achievements and titles
- Olympic finals: London 2012
- World finals: Fina worlds Shanghai, China. Fina Worlds Barcelona, Spain.Sc Fina worlds Doha, Qatar
Medal record
Women's swimming
Representing Fiji
Event	1st	2nd	3rd
Pacific Games	2	14	8
Oceania Championships	0	1	3
Total	2	15	11
Pacific Games
Gold medal – first place	2019 Apia	200 m freestyle
Gold medal – first place	2019 Apia	4×100 m freestyle
Silver medal – second place	2011 Nouméa	4×200 m freestyle
Silver medal – second place	2011 Nouméa	4×100 m medley
Silver medal – second place	2015 Port Moresby	100 m freestyle
Silver medal – second place	2015 Port Moresby	200 m freestyle
Silver medal – second place	2015 Port Moresby	400 m freestyle
Silver medal – second place	2015 Port Moresby	800 m freestyle
Silver medal – second place	2015 Port Moresby	200 m medley
Silver medal – second place	2015 Port Moresby	400 m medley
Silver medal – second place	2015 Port Moresby	3 km open water
Silver medal – second place	2015 Port Moresby	4×100 m freestyle
Silver medal – second place	2019 Apia	400 m freestyle
Silver medal – second place	2019 Apia	200 m medley
Silver medal – second place	2019 Apia	4×100 m medley
Silver medal – second place	2019 Apia	4×50 m mixed medley
Bronze medal – third place	2011 Nouméa	200 m freestyle
Bronze medal – third place	2011 Nouméa	50 m breaststroke
Bronze medal – third place	2011 Nouméa	100 m breaststroke
Bronze medal – third place	2011 Nouméa	200 m breaststroke
Bronze medal – third place	2015 Port Moresby	50 m butterfly
Bronze medal – third place	2015 Port Moresby	4×50 m mixed medley
Bronze medal – third place	2019 Apia	100 m freestyle
Bronze medal – third place	2019 Apia	5 km open water
Oceania Championships
Silver medal – second place	2016 Suva	4×100 m mixed medley
Bronze medal – third place	2016 Suva	4×100 m freestyle
Bronze medal – third place	2016 Suva	4×50 m mixed freestyle
Bronze medal – third place	2012 Nouméa	200 m freestyle
- Updated on 4 September 2021

Matelita Buadromo (born 15 January 1996) is a Fijian swimmer.

Buadromo hails from the islands of Moala and Rotuma. She has competed internationally since she was eleven and won a bronze medal at the 2012 Oceania Swimming Championships in the 200m freestyle event.

Buadromo was selected to represent Fiji at the 2012 Summer Olympics. She is an all-rounder competitor but specializes in the 100 and 200 metre breaststroke. She turned pro when she competed in the 2011 Pacific Games in New Caledonia.
