= Rainui Teriipaia =

French Polynesian swimmer

Personal information
- Born: 8 July 1983

Sport
- Country: French Polynesia
- Sport: Swimming
Medal record
Men's swimming
Representing Tahiti
Pacific Games
| Silver medal – second place | 2019 Apia | 4 × 100m medley relay |
| Gold medal – first place | 2015 Port Moresby | 4 × 100m medley relay |
| Bronze medal – third place | 2015 Port Moresby | 100m Breaststroke |
| Bronze medal – third place | 2015 Port Moresby | 50m Breaststroke |
| Gold medal – first place | 2011 Nouméa | 100m Breaststroke |
| Gold medal – first place | 2011 Nouméa | 50m Breaststroke |
| Silver medal – second place | 2011 Nouméa | 4 × 100m freestyle relay |
| Silver medal – second place | 2011 Nouméa | 4 × 200m freestyle relay |
| Silver medal – second place | 2011 Nouméa | 4 × 100m medley relay |
| Bronze medal – third place | 2011 Nouméa | 200m Breaststroke |
| Gold medal – first place | 2007 Apia | 200m Breaststroke |
| Gold medal – first place | 2007 Apia | 100m Breaststroke |
| Gold medal – first place | 2007 Apia | 50m Breaststroke |
| Silver medal – second place | 2007 Apia | 4 × 100m medley relay |

Rainui Teriipaia (born 8 July 1983) is a French Polynesian swimmer who has represented French Polynesia at the Pacific Games.

At the 2015 Pacific Games in Port Moresby he won gold in the 4 × 100m medley relay, and bronze in the 50m and 100m breaststroke. At the 2019 Pacific Games in Apia he won silver in the 4 × 100m medley relay.
