= Stéphane Debaere =

French Polynesian swimmer

Personal information
- Born: Papeete, French Polynesia

Sport
- Country: French Polynesia
- Sport: Swimming
Medal record
Men's swimming
Pacific Games
Gold medal – first place	2015 Port Moresby	4 × 100 m Freestyle relay
Gold medal – first place	2015 Port Moresby	4 × 200 m Freestyle relay
Gold medal – first place	2015 Port Moresby	4 × 100 m Medley relay
Silver medal – second place	2015 Port Moresby	50m Freestyle
Silver medal – second place	2015 Port Moresby	100m Freestyle
Silver medal – second place	2015 Port Moresby	50m Breaststroke
Silver medal – second place	2015 Port Moresby	50m Butterfly
Silver medal – second place	2007 Apia	50m Breaststroke
Bronze medal – third place	2007 Apia	100m Breaststroke
Silver medal – second place	2007 Apia	4x100m Free Relay
Silver medal – second place	2007 Apia	4x200m Free Relay
Silver medal – second place	2007 Apia	4x200m Medley Relay
Silver medal – second place	2007 Apia	5K Open Water
Representing France
France Swimming Championships
Silver medal – second place	2011 Angers	50m Breaststroke

Stéphane Debaere (born 1 January 1989) is a French Polynesian swimmer and model.

Debaere was born in Papeete. He began to swim in his hometown which he left at the age of 14 for metropolitan France where he completed his secondary studies in Talence, Gironde.

At the 2007 South Pacific Games in Apia, he won silver in the 50m Breaststroke, 4x100m Free Relay, 4x200m Free Relay, 4x200m Medley Relay, and 5K Open Water, and bronze in the 100m Breaststroke. At the 2015 Pacific Games in Port Moresby, he won 3 gold and 4 silver medals.

In February 2016, he won the Tahiti Infos ATN Challenge. He subsequently organised the "Tahiti Swimming Experience" competition in October 2016. At the French Swimming Championships in 2016, he broke the French Polynesian record for the 100m freestyle.
