= Cheyenne Rova =

Fijian swimmer

Personal information
- National team: Fiji
- Born: 23 April 1995 (age 31) Levuka, Ovalau, Fiji
- Height: 1.68 m (5 ft 6 in)
- Weight: 58 kg (128 lb)

Sport
- Sport: Swimming
- College team: Iowa Lakes Community College (2013–2015); Minnesota State University (2015–2017)
Medal record
Women's swimming
Representing Fiji
Oceania Championships
Bronze medal – third place	2018 Port Moresby	100 m backstroke
Bronze medal – third place	2018 Port Moresby	4×50 m mixed medley
Pacific Games
Gold medal – first place	2019 Apia	4×100 m freestyle
Silver medal – second place	2019 Apia	50 m backstroke
Silver medal – second place	2019 Apia	4×100 m medley
Silver medal – second place	2019 Apia	4×50 m mixed freestyle
Bronze medal – third place	2019 Apia	4×200 m freestyle

Cheyenne Rova (born 23 April 1995) is a Fijian swimmer. She competed in the women's 100 metre backstroke event at the 2017 World Aquatics Championships.

She won silver with her team at the 2011 Pacific Games in the 4×100 metres freestyle and 4×100 metres medley relay events, as well as the 4×100 metres and the 4×200 metres freestyle relay at the 2015 Pacific Games. She also competed in three events at the 2018 Commonwealth Games.

She is a sister of Adele Rova.

== See also ==
- List of Fijian records in swimming
