= Taichi Vakasama =

Fijian swimmer

Personal information
- Nationality: Fijian
- Born: 12 October 1999 (age 26) Saitama, Japan
- Height: 1.8 m (5 ft 11 in)
- Weight: 68 kg (150 lb)

Sport
- Sport: Swimming
- Strokes: Breaststroke
Medal record
Men's swimming
Representing Fiji
Oceania Championships
Silver medal – second place	2018 Port Moresby	100 m breaststroke
Silver medal – second place	2018 Port Moresby	200 m breaststroke
Bronze medal – third place	2018 Port Moresby	50 m breaststroke
Pacific Games
Gold medal – first place	2019 Apia	100 m breaststroke
Gold medal – first place	2019 Apia	200 m breaststroke
Silver medal – second place	2019 Apia	4×50 m mixed medley
Bronze medal – third place	2019 Apia	200 m medley
Bronze medal – third place	2019 Apia	4×200 m freestyle
Bronze medal – third place	2019 Apia	4×100 m medley
Commonwealth Youth Games
Bronze medal – third place	2017 Nassau	200 m breaststroke

Taichi Vakasama (born 12 October 1999) is a Fijian swimmer. He competed in the men's 100 metre breaststroke event at the 2018 FINA World Swimming Championships (25 m), in Hangzhou, China. He also represented Fiji in the men's 200m breaststroke heats at the 2020 Olympics.

At the 2020 Summer Olympics, he was the flag bearer for Team Fiji
