= Epeli Rabua =

Fijian swimmer

Personal information
- Born: 24 October 1998 (age 27)

Sport
- Sport: Swimming
Medal record
Men's swimming
Representing Fiji
Pacific Games
Silver medal – second place	2019 Apia	100 m breaststroke
Silver medal – second place	2019 Apia	4×50 m mixed freestyle
Bronze medal – third place	2019 Apia	50 m breaststroke
Bronze medal – third place	2019 Apia	4×100 m freestyle
Bronze medal – third place	2019 Apia	4×200 m freestyle
Bronze medal – third place	2019 Apia	4×100 m medley
Oceania Championships
Gold medal – first place	2018 Port Moresby	50 m breaststroke
Bronze medal – third place	2018 Port Moresby	100 m breaststroke

Epeli Rabua (born 24 October 1998) is a Fijian swimmer. He competed in the men's 50 metre breaststroke event at the 2017 World Aquatics Championships.
