= Emma Terebo =

New Caledonian and French swimmer

Personal information
- Nationality: French / New Caledonian
- Born: 10 July 1998 (age 28)

Sport
- Sport: Swimming
- College team: Florida State University
Medal record
Women's swimming
Representing France
European Championships (LC)
Silver medal – second place	2022 Rome	4×100 m medley
Representing New Caledonia
Event	1st	2nd	3rd
Pacific Games	16	1	1
Oceania Championships	0	0	5
Total	16	1	6
Pacific Games
Gold medal – first place	2015 Port Moresby	50 m freestyle
Gold medal – first place	2015 Port Moresby	100 m freestyle
Gold medal – first place	2015 Port Moresby	50 m backstroke
Gold medal – first place	2015 Port Moresby	100 m backstroke
Gold medal – first place	2015 Port Moresby	50 m butterfly
Gold medal – first place	2015 Port Moresby	4×100 m freestyle
Gold medal – first place	2015 Port Moresby	4×200 m freestyle
Gold medal – first place	2015 Port Moresby	4×100 m medley
Gold medal – first place	2015 Port Moresby	4×50 m mixed medley
Gold medal – first place	2019 Apia	50 m freestyle
Gold medal – first place	2019 Apia	100 m freestyle
Gold medal – first place	2019 Apia	100 m backstroke
Gold medal – first place	2019 Apia	4×200 m freestyle
Gold medal – first place	2019 Apia	4×100 m medley
Gold medal – first place	2019 Apia	4×50 m mixed freestyle
Gold medal – first place	2019 Apia	4×50 m mixed medley
Silver medal – second place	2019 Apia	4×100 m freestyle
Bronze medal – third place	2015 Port Moresby	4×50 m mixed freestyle
Oceania Championships
Bronze medal – third place	2012 Nouméa	100 m freestyle
Bronze medal – third place	2012 Nouméa	50 m backstroke
Bronze medal – third place	2012 Nouméa	100 m backstroke
Bronze medal – third place	2012 Nouméa	200 m backstroke
Bronze medal – third place	2012 Nouméa	4×100 m medley

Emma Terebo (born 10 July 1998) is a swimmer who represents New Caledonia and France. At the 2015 Pacific Games, Terebo won eight gold medals, five in individual events and three in relays, including setting three-game records in the individual events. In 2019, she competed at the 2019 Pacific Games held in Samoa.

== See also ==
- Swimming at the 2015 Pacific Games
