= Rahiti De Vos =

French Polynesian swimmer

Personal information
- Born: 11 January 1996 (age 27) Papeete, French Polynesia

Sport
- Country: French Polynesia
- Sport: Swimming
Medal record
Men's swimming
Representing Tahiti
Pacific Games
Gold medal – first place	2019 Apia	400m freestyle
Gold medal – first place	2019 Apia	1500m freestyle
Gold medal – first place	2019 Apia	5km open water
Silver medal – second place	2019 Apia	200m freestyle
Silver medal – second place	2019 Apia	4 × 100m freestyle relay
Silver medal – second place	2019 Apia	4 × 200m freestyle relay
Silver medal – second place	2019 Apia	4 × 100m medley relay
Gold medal – first place	2015 Port Moresby	200m freestyle
Gold medal – first place	2015 Port Moresby	400m freestyle
Gold medal – first place	2015 Port Moresby	1500m freestyle
Gold medal – first place	2015 Port Moresby	200m butterfly
Gold medal – first place	2015 Port Moresby	4 × 100m freestyle relay
Gold medal – first place	2015 Port Moresby	4 × 200m freestyle relay
Silver medal – second place	2015 Port Moresby	3km open water
Bronze medal – third place	2015 Port Moresby	100m butterfly

Rahiti De Vos (born 11 January 1996) is a French swimmer who has represented French Polynesia at the Pacific Games and France at the 2014 Summer Youth Olympics in Beijing, and at the FINA Swimming World Cup in Dubai and Qatar.

De Vos was born in Tahiti, French Polynesia and educated at Lycée Don Bosco. He relocated to France at the age of 15 to join Font-Romeu National Altitude Training Centre, where he won the youth national championships. In 2016 he won a scholarship to study and swim at the University of Utah, where he studied information systems.

At the 2015 Pacific Games in Port Moresby, he won gold in 6 events including the 400m freestyle, 1500m freestyle, 200m freestyle, 200m butterfly, 4 × 100m freestyle relay, 4 × 200m freestyle relay, and bronze in the 100m butterfly.

At the 2019 Pacific Games in Apia he won gold in the open water swim, 400m freestyle, and the 1500m freestyle, breaking the Pacific Games record in the latter. He also won silver in the 200m freestyle and 4 × 100 m relay events.

In March 2020 he qualified for the National Collegiate Athletic Association division 1 swimming championships.
