= Teiki Dupont =

French Polynesian swimmer

Sport
- Country: French Polynesia
- Sport: Swimming
Medal record
Men's swimming
Representing Tahiti
Pacific Games
Silver medal – second place	2019 Apia	4 × 100m freestyle relay
Silver medal – second place	2019 Apia	4 × 100m medley relay
Bronze medal – third place	2019 Apia	50m freestyle
Bronze medal – third place	2019 Apia	50m backstroke
Bronze medal – third place	2019 Apia	100m backstroke
Gold medal – first place	2015 Port Moresby	200m backstroke
Gold medal – first place	2015 Port Moresby	4 × 100m medley relay
Silver medal – second place	2015 Port Moresby	50m backstroke
Silver medal – second place	2015 Port Moresby	100m backstroke

Teiki Dupont is a French Polynesian swimmer who has represented French Polynesia at the Pacific Games.

At the 2015 Pacific Games in Port Moresby he won gold in the 4 × 100m medley relay and 200m backstroke, and silver in the 50m and 100m backstroke.

At the 2019 Pacific Games in Apia he won silver in the 4 × 100m freestyle relay, and 4 × 100 m medley relay, and bronze in the 50m freestyle, 50m backstroke, 100m backstroke, and 4x50m freestyle mixed relay.
