= Paul Elaisa =

Fijian swimmer

Personal information
- Nationality: Rotuman
- Born: Paul Sau'oflanoa Lawrence Elaisa; 21 January 1994 (age 32) Suva, Fiji
- Education: Iowa Lakes Community College; Lincoln College; Lindenwood University (BA Sports Management)
- Height: 185 cm (6 ft 1 in)
- Weight: 94 kg (207 lb; 14 st 11 lb)

Sport
- Country: Fiji
- Sport: Swimming
- Event(s): 1,500, 400, 200, 100 freestyle – 100, 200 butterfly and 400, 200 IM
- Turned pro: At the 2008 Oceania Games in New Zealand

Achievements and titles
- National finals: 2015 NJCAA Nationals Swimming 200 butterfly (3rd), 400IM (4th), 200IM (5th)
Medal record
2011 Pacific Games
Bronze medal – third place	2011 Nouméa	200m Backstroke
Bronze medal – third place	2011 Nouméa	200m IM
Bronze medal – third place	2011 Nouméa	4x100m Freestyle Relay
Bronze medal – third place	2011 Nouméa	4x200m Freestyle Relay
- Updated on 7 August 2012

Paul Elaisa (born 21 January 1994 in Suva) is a swimmer who competed for Fiji at the 2012 Summer Olympics. His selection caused controversy, as Douglas Miller had been initially nominated.

== Career ==
Elaisa competed in the 2009 and 2011 World Aquatics Championships, and in the 2011 Pacific Games (where he won four bronze medals). In the Olympics, he ranked 47th at the Men's 100m freestyle event and did not advance to the semifinals.

Later, he moved to the US to pursue higher education, while still swimming competitively.

He competed in three events at the 2018 Commonwealth Games.
