= Nicolas Vermorel =

French Polynesian swimmer

Personal information
- Born: 3 August 1999 Papeete, French Polynesia

Sport
- Country: French Polynesia
- Sport: Swimming
Medal record
Men's swimming
Representing Tahiti
Pacific Games
Gold medal – first place	2019 Apia	50m butterfly
Silver medal – second place	2019 Apia	100m freestyle
Silver medal – second place	2019 Apia	100m butterfly
Silver medal – second place	2019 Apia	4 × 100m freestyle relay
Silver medal – second place	2019 Apia	4 × 200m freestyle relay
Silver medal – second place	2019 Apia	4 × 100m medley relay
Silver medal – second place	2019 Apia	4 × 50m medley mixed relay
Representing France
French swimming championships
Silver medal – second place	2021 Chartres	100m butterfly
Silver medal – second place	2020 Saint-Raphaël	50m butterfly
Gold medal – first place	2019 Angers	4 × 50m freestyle relay
Gold medal – first place	2019 Angers	4 × 50m medley relay

Nicolas Vermorel (born 3 August 1999) is a French Polynesian swimmer who has represented French Polynesia at the Pacific Games. He is the brother of swimmer Guillaume Vermorel.

Vermorel was born in Papeete and is of Chinese and French descent.

At the 2019 Pacific Games in Apia he won gold in the 50m butterfly, silver in the 100m butterfly, 4 × 200 m freestyle relay, 4 × 100m freestyle relay, and 100m freestyle, and bronze in the 4x50m freestyle mixed relay.

At the 2019 French swimming championships in Angers he won two gold medals in the freestyle and medley relays. At the 2020 French swimming championships in Saint-Raphaël he won bronze in the 50m butterfly. At the 2021 championships in Chartres he won silver in the 100m butterfly.
