= Moana Wind =

Fijian swimmer (born 2001)

Personal information
- Born: 12 December 2001 (age 24)

Sport
- Sport: Swimming
Medal record
Women's swimming
Representing Fiji
Pacific Games
Gold medal – first place	2019 Samoa	50 m breaststroke
Gold medal – first place	2019 Samoa	100 m breaststroke
Silver medal – second place	2019 Samoa	200 m breaststroke
Silver medal – second place	2019 Samoa	4×100 m medley
Oceania Championships
Bronze medal – third place	2018 Port Moresby	50 m breaststroke

Moana Wind (born 12 December 2001) is a Fijian swimmer. She represented Fiji at the 2019 World Aquatics Championships in Gwangju, South Korea. She competed in the women's 100 metre butterfly where she did not advance to compete in the semi-finals. She also competed in the women's 100 metre breaststroke event.

In 2019, she also competed at the 2019 Pacific Games held in Samoa and she won two gold medals and two silver medals.
