= Charlotte Robin =

New Caledonian swimmer

Personal information
- Nationality: French / New Caledonian
- Born: 1985 (age 40–41)

Sport
- Sport: Swimming
Medal record
Pacific Games
Gold medal – first place	2019 Samoa	5km open water

Charlotte Robin (born 1985) is a swimmer and triathlete who represents New Caledonia. In July 2019, she won the first gold medal of the 2019 Pacific Games, winning the women's 5km open water race.
