= 2016 Oceania Swimming Championships =

The 11th Oceania Swimming Championships were held 21–26 June 2016 at the Damodar Aquatic Centre in Suva, Fiji. It was the eleventh edition of the biennial championships, and featured competition in swimming, open water swimming and synchronized swimming.

== Participating countries ==
Countries with confirmed teams for the 2016 Oceania Swimming Championships were:

- Australia
- Cook Islands
- Micronesia
- Fiji
- Guam
- Hawaii
- Marshall Islands
- New Caledonia
- New Zealand
- Northern Mariana Islands
- Palau
- Papua New Guinea
- Samoa
- Tonga

== Results ==
=== Swimming ===
==== Men ====
Event	Gold		Silver		Bronze	
Men's freestyle
50 m	Daniel Hunter; New Zealand	22.49	Cameron Jones; Australia	22.82	Jake Kersten; Australia	22.91
100 m	Daniel Hunter; New Zealand	49.49	Jake Kersten; Australia	50.13	Julian Weir; New Zealand	50.85
200 m	Jake Kersten; Australia	1:51.45	Thomas Wotton; Australia	1:53.39	Samuel Seghers; Papua New Guinea	1:53.64
400 m	Wesley Roberts; Cook Islands	3:57.91	Matt Hyde; New Zealand	3:58.29	Michael Petrides; Hawaii	4:06.05
1500 m	Wesley Roberts; Cook Islands	15:42.27	Michael Petrides; Hawaii	16:22.19	Troy Balvert; New Zealand	16:22.58
Men's backstroke
50 m	Zac Incerti; Australia	25.91	Ryan Pini; Papua New Guinea	26.43	Bayley Main; New Zealand	26.58
100 m	Zac Incerti; Australia	54.94	Jackson Cropp; New Zealand	56.98	Corneille Coetzee; New Zealand	57.20
200 m	Corneille Coetzee; New Zealand	2:03.62	Jackson Cropp; New Zealand	2:05.10	Michael Petrides; Hawaii	2:15.62
Men's breaststroke
50 m	Benjamin Schulte; Guam	29.26	Jacob Garrod; New Zealand	29.32	Meli Malani; Fiji	29.42
100 m	Jacob Garrod; New Zealand	1:03.31	Benjamin Schulte; Guam	1:03.46	Nathan Zhu; Australia	1:03.94
200 m	Zac Stubblety-Cook; Australia	2:16.69	Nathan Zhu; Australia; Jonathan Rutter; New Zealand	2:17.13; 2:17.13	not awarded	
Men's butterfly
50 m	Cameron Jones; Australia	24.27	Ryan Pini; Papua New Guinea	24.45	Daniel Hunter; New Zealand	24.62
100 m	Cameron Jones; Australia	53.69	Ryan Pini; Papua New Guinea	54.13	Wilrich Coetzee; New Zealand	55.08
200 m	Wilrich Coetzee; New Zealand	2:00.44	Thomas Wotton; Australia	2:01.43	David Van Der Star; New Zealand	2:04.90
Men's individual medley
200 m	Wilrich Coetzee; New Zealand	2:05.51	Jonathan Rutter; New Zealand	2:05.89	Thibaut Mary; New Caledonia	2:10.40
400 m	Andrew Trembath; New Zealand	4:32.82	Blake Gunn; New Zealand	4:35.97	Brandon Schuster; Samoa	4:36.13
Men's relays
4 × 100 m freestyle	Australia	3:20.25	New Caledonia	3:26.73	Fiji	3:38.89
4 × 200 m freestyle	Australia	7:27.19	New Zealand	7:38.23	New Caledonia	7:54.07
4 × 100 m medley	Australia	3:42.67	New Zealand	3:44.46	Papua New Guinea	3:52.13

==== Women ====
Event	Gold		Silver		Bronze	
Women's freestyle
50 m	Gabrielle Fa'amausili; New Zealand	25.60	Natasha Ramsden; Australia	25.96	Hadley Lyndsay; Australia	26.25
100 m	Helena Gasson; New Zealand	56.49	Natasha Ramsden; Australia; Carina Doyle; New Zealand	57.11; 57.11	not awarded	
200 m	Acacia Wildin-Snedden; Australia	2:02.37	Carina Doyle; New Zealand	2:02.96	Yeonsu Lee; New Zealand	2:03.58
400 m	Acacia Wildin-Snedden; Australia	4:17.00	Monique King; New Zealand	4:17.99	Carina Doyle; New Zealand	4:21.07
800 m	Monique King; New Zealand	8:53.54	Alessandra Colombini; Australia	9:00.97	Nohea Lileikis; Hawaii	9:03.00
Women's backstroke
50 m	Gabrielle Fa'amausili; New Zealand	29.19	Abby Duncan; Australia	29.77	Mikaela Cornelissen; Australia	30.09
100 m	Gabrielle Fa'amausili; New Zealand	1:02.38	Lushavel Stickland; Samoa	1:05.96	Anais Toven; New Caledonia	1:06.71
200 m	Annabelle Paterson; New Zealand	2:16.68	Lushavel Stickland; Samoa	2:23.99	Nohea Lileikis; Hawaii	2:24.98
Women's breaststroke
50 m	Bronagh Ryan; New Zealand	33.52	Moana Wind; Fiji	33.78	Bec Cross; Australia	33.92
100 m	Bronagh Ryan; New Zealand	1:11.71	Bec Cross; Australia	1:11.90	Ellie Eastwood; New Zealand	1:14.61
200 m	Bec Cross; Australia	2:34.83	Ellie Eastwood; New Zealand	2:36.10	Millie Macdonald; New Zealand	2:37.13
Women's butterfly
50 m	Helena Gasson; New Zealand	27.14	Mikaela Cornelissen; Australia	27.47	Abby Duncan; Australia	27.58
100 m	Helena Gasson; New Zealand	59.91	Alice Stuart; Australia	1:00.68	Mikaela Cornelissen; Australia	1:01.28
200 m	Alice Stuart; Australia	2:10.65	Helena Gasson; New Zealand	2:12.67	Kara Svenson; Australia	2:16.21
Women's individual medley
200 m	Helena Gasson; New Zealand	2:16.95	Bec Cross; Australia	2:18.94	Hadley Lyndsay; Australia	2:19.94
400 m	Acacia Wildin-Snedden; Australia	4:49.84	Bec Cross; Australia	4:54.64	Yeonsu Lee; New Zealand	5:05.38
Women's relays
4 × 100 m freestyle	Australia	3:48.73	New Zealand	3:49.57	Fiji	3:58.60
4 × 200 m freestyle	New Zealand	8:17.78	Australia	8:23.56	New Caledonia	8:42.77
4 × 100 m medley	New Zealand	4:10.88	Australia	4:16.49	New Caledonia	4:30.23

==== Mixed events ====
Event	Gold		Silver		Bronze	
4×50 m freestyle relay	Australia	1:37.17; CR	New Zealand	1:38.92	Fiji	1:41.71
4×100 m freestyle relay	New Zealand	3:36.62	Australia	3:38.62	Fiji	3:54.52
4×50 m medley relay	New Zealand	1:48.65	Fiji	1:53.48	Papua New Guinea	1:53.86
4×100 m medley relay	New Zealand	3:54.39; CR	Australia	3:55.99	Hawaii	4:15.11

=== Open Water ===
==== Men ====
Event	Gold		Silver		Bronze	
5 km	Matthew Scott; New Zealand	1:01:29.20	Lachlan Colquhoun; Australia	1:01:29.50	Wesley Roberts; Cook Islands	1:01:31.60
10km	Jack Brazier; Australia	2:22:02.40	Lachlan Colquhoun; Australia	2:22:07.40	Troy Balvert; New Zealand	2:23:04.80

==== Women ====
Event	Gold		Silver		Bronze	
5km	Alessandra Colombini; Australia	1:07:18.30	Bianca Crisp; Australia	1:07:38.40	Jacey Cropp; New Zealand	1:09:10.60
10km	Alessandra Colombini; Australia	2:41:50.50	Bianca Crisp; Australia	2:42:27.80	Stefannie Gillespie; New Zealand	2:42:28.40

== Swimming medal table ==
Rank	Nation	Gold	Silver	Bronze	Total
1	New Zealand (NZL)	23	15	13	51
2	Australia (AUS)	16	18	9	43
3	Cook Islands (COK)	2	0	0	2
4	Guam (GUM)	1	1	0	2
5	Papua New Guinea (PNG)	0	3	3	6
6	Fiji (FJI)	0	2	5	7
7	Samoa (SAM)	0	2	1	3
8	Hawaii (HAW)	0	1	5	6
8	New Caledonia (NCL)	0	1	5	6
Totals (9 entries)		42	43	41	126
