= Lushavel Stickland =

Samoan swimmer (born 1998)

Personal information
- Nationality: Samoan
- Born: 8 March 1998 (age 28)

Sport
- Sport: Swimming
Medal record
Women's swimming
Representing Samoa
Event	1st	2nd	3rd
Pacific Games	1	3	2
Oceania Championships	0	2	0
Total	1	5	2
Pacific Games
Gold medal – first place	2019 Apia	50 m backstroke
Silver medal – second place	2019 Apia	50 m freestyle
Silver medal – second place	2019 Apia	100 m freestyle
Silver medal – second place	2019 Apia	100 m backstroke
Bronze medal – third place	2019 Apia	50 m butterfly
Bronze medal – third place	2019 Apia	4×100 m freestyle
Oceania Championships
Silver medal – second place	2018 Port Moresby	50 m backstroke
Silver medal – second place	2018 Port Moresby	100 m backstroke

Lushavel Stickland (born 8 March 1998) is a Samoan swimmer. She competed in the women's 50 metre freestyle and women's 100 metre backstroke events at the 2019 World Aquatics Championships held in Gwangju, South Korea. In both events she did not advance to compete in the semi-finals. In 2019, she also competed at the 2019 Pacific Games held in Samoa.
