= Swimming at the 2019 Pacific Games =

- Location: Apia, Samoa
- Dates: 8–13 July 2019

Swimming at the 2019 Pacific Games in Samoa was held on 8–13 July 2019 at the Samoa Aquatic Centre in Apia, with the Sheraton Samoa Beach Resort in Mulifanua hosting the open water swim.

The aquatic centre, originally built to cater for the 2007 South Pacific Games, was refurbished with assistance from China prior to the 2019 games.

== Event schedule ==
The forty events in the pool – nineteen each for men and women, plus two mixed relays – were spread over five days at the Samoa Aquatic Centre, with heats held in the morning sessions, followed by the finals in the evenings.

Tue. 9 July	Wed. 10 July	Thu. 11 July	Fri. 12 July	Sat. 13 July
200 breast (M); 200 breast (W); 800 free (W); 50 fly (M); 50 fly (W); 200 back (M); 200 back (W); 4 × 100 medley (M); 4 × 100 medley (W)	50 back (W); 50 back (M); 400 IM (W); 400 IM (M); 100 fly (W); 100 fly (M); 4 × 200 free (W); 4 × 200 free (M)	200 free (M); 200 free (W); 100 back (M); 100 back (W); 50 breast (M); 50 breast (W); 4 × 100 free (M); 4 × 100 free (W)	200 IM (W); 200 IM (M); 1500 free (M); 100 free (W); 100 free (M); 4 × 50 free (Mix)	100 breast (M); 100 breast (W); 400 free (M); 400 free (W); 200 fly (M); 200 fly (W); 50 free (M); 50 free (W); 4 × 50 medley (Mix)

The men's and women's open water events were held on Monday 8 July at the Sheraton Samoa Beach Resort.

== Teams ==
The nations competing were:

- American Samoa
- Cook Islands
- Fiji
- Guam
- Marshall Islands
- New Caledonia
- Northern Mariana Islands
- Palau
- Papua New Guinea
- Samoa
- Solomon Islands
- Tahiti
- Tokelau
- Tonga
- Vanuatu

== Medal summary ==
=== Medal table ===
* Host nation (Samoa)

Rank	Nation	Gold	Silver	Bronze	Total
1	New Caledonia	25	11	13	49
2	Fiji	6	9	13	28
3	Tahiti	5	11	7	23
4	Samoa*	5	6	6	17
5	Cook Islands	1	2	1	4
6	American Samoa	0	1	1	2
6	Papua New Guinea	0	1	1	2
8	Guam	0	1	0	1
Totals (8 entries)		42	42	42	126

=== Men's ===
Event	Gold		Silver		Bronze	
50 m freestyle	Julien-Pierre Goyetche (NCL)	23.03 GR, NR	Florent Janin (NCL)	23.13	Teiki Dupont (TAH)	23.17 NR
100 m freestyle	Florent Janin (NCL)	50.59	Nicolas Vermorel (TAH)	51.36	Wesley Roberts (COK)	51.49 NR
200 m freestyle	Wesley Roberts (COK)	1:51.36	Rahiti De Vos (TAH)	1:52.67	Thibault Mary (NCL)	1:52.78
400 m freestyle	Rahiti De Vos (TAH)	3:56.35 GR, NR	Wesley Roberts (COK)	4:00.97	Brandon Schuster (SAM)	4:03.22 NR
1500 m freestyle	Rahiti De Vos (TAH)	15:40.47 GR, NR	Wesley Roberts (COK)	16:10.35	Hugo Savignac (NCL)	16:39.80
50 m backstroke	Julien-Pierre Goyetche (NCL)	27.01	Netani Ross (FIJ)	27.13 NR	Teiki Dupont (TAH)	27.40
100 m backstroke	Emmanuel Limozin (NCL)	58.60	Julien-Pierre Goyetche (NCL)	58.92	Teiki Dupont (TAH)	58.99
200 m backstroke	Brandon Schuster (SAM)	2:08.48 NR	Manuarii Lechêne (TAH)	2:10.31	Hugo Savignac (NCL)	2:10.44 NR
50 m breaststroke	Thomas Oswald (NCL)	28.38 NR	Benjamin Schulte (GUM)	28.75 NR	Epeli Rabua (FIJ)	28.89 NR
100 m breaststroke	Taichi Vakasama (FIJ)	1:02.84 GR, NR	Epeli Rabua (FIJ)	1:03.89	Ryan Maskelyne (PNG)	1:04.24 NR
200 m breaststroke	Taichi Vakasama (FIJ)	2:14.98 NR	Ryan Maskelyne (PNG)	2:17.51 NR	Brandon Schuster (SAM)	2:18.26 NR
50 m butterfly	Nicolas Vermorel (TAH)	24.04 NR	Florent Janin (NCL)	24.85	Thibaut Mary (NCL)	24.90
100 m butterfly	Thibaut Mary (NCL)	54.09 NR	Nicolas Vermorel (TAH)	54.16	Thomas Oswald (NCL)	55.50
200 m butterfly	Thibaut Mary (NCL)	2:02.29 GR, NR	Guillaume Vermorel (TAH)	2:06.36	Temafa Yalimaiwai (FIJ)	2:10.25 NR
200 m individual medley	Emmanuel Limozin (NCL)	2:04.04 GR, NR	Brandon Schuster (SAM)	2:05.54 NR	Taichi Vakasama (FIJ)	2:07.84 NR
400 m individual medley	Brandon Schuster (SAM)	4:24.04 GR, NR	Emmanuel Limozin (NCL)	4:29.99 NR	Alex Huet (NCL)	4:30.86
4 × 100 m freestyle relay	New Caledonia; Florent Janin; Emmanuel Limozin; Julien-Pierre Goyetche; Thibaut Mary	3:23.21 GR, NR	Tahiti; Nicolas Vermorel; Rahiti De Vos; Teiki Dupont; Tuhiva Ah Sha-Roignant	3:30.97	Fiji; Temafa Yalimaiwai; Epeli Rabua; Hansel McCag; Netani Ross	3:33.89 NR
4 × 200 m freestyle relay	New Caledonia; Emmanuel Limozin; Florent Janin; Alex Huet; Thibaut Mary	7:38.51 NR	Tahiti; Rahiti De Vos; Tuhiva Ah Sha-Roignant; Guillaume Vermorel; Nicolas Vermorel	7:55.76	Fiji; Taichi Vakasama; Epeli Rabua; Hansel McCag; Temafa Yalimaiwai	8:09.56 NR
4 × 100 m medley relay	New Caledonia; Julien-Pierre Goyetche; Thomas Oswald; Thibaut Mary; Florent Janin	3:48.33 GR, NR	Tahiti; Teiki Dupont; Rainui Teriipaia; Nicolas Vermorel; Rahiti De Vos	3:48.91	Fiji; Netani Ross; Taichi Vakasama; Temafa Yalimaiwai; Epeli Rabua	3:51.95 NR
5 km open water	Rahiti De Vos (TAH)	1:03:20	Hugo Savignac (NCL)	1:03:21	Benoît Rivière (NCL)	1:03:41
GR Games record for the Pacific Games/South Pacific Games

=== Women's ===
Event	Gold		Silver		Bronze	
50 m freestyle	Emma Terebo (NCL)	26.41	Lushavel Stickland (SAM)	26.71 NR	Yolani Blake (FIJ)	27.16
100 m freestyle	Emma Terebo (NCL)	57.60	Lushavel Stickland (SAM)	57.91 NR	Matelita Buadromo (FIJ)	58.46
200 m freestyle	Matelita Buadromo (FIJ)	2:08.58	May Toven (NCL)	2:10.21	Maiana Flament (NCL)	2:11.36
400 m freestyle	Maiana Flament (NCL)	4:27.96	Matelita Buadromo (FIJ)	4:36.98	Charlotte Robin (NCL)	4:42.35
800 m freestyle	Maiana Flament (NCL)	9:21.39	Charlotte Robin (NCL)	9:37.72	Rosemarie Rova (FIJ)	10:03.00
50 m backstroke	Lushavel Stickland (SAM)	29.96	Cheyenne Rova (FIJ)	31.11	Jelani Wetzell (SAM)	31.76
100 m backstroke	Emma Terebo (NCL)	1:02.96	Lushavel Stickland (SAM)	1:04.43 NR	Lauren Sale (SAM)	1:06.65
200 m backstroke	Lauren Sale (SAM)	2:20.84	Angeline Tregoat (TAH)	2:29.31	Maiana Flament (NCL)	2:31.51 NR
50 m breaststroke	Moana Wind (FIJ)	33.39 NR	Tiali Scanlan (ASA)	33.98 NR	Poerani Betrand (TAH)	34.09
100 m breaststroke	Moana Wind (FIJ)	1:13.79 NR	Poerani Betrand (TAH)	1:14.23 NR	Tiali Scanlan (ASA)	1:15.08 NR
200 m breaststroke	Poerani Bertrand (TAH)	2:40.73 NR	Moana Wind (FIJ)	2:45.29	Adelaine Williams (NCL)	2:51.70
50 m butterfly	May Toven (NCL)	28.45	Armelle Hidrio (NCL)	28.92	Lushavel Stickland (SAM)	29.53
100 m butterfly	May Toven (NCL)	1:03.32	Lauren Sale (SAM)	1:04.27 NR	Julie Decaix (NCL)	1:06.91
200 m butterfly	Julie Decaix (NCL)	2:30.94	Maiana Flament (NCL)	2:31.24	Rosemarie Rova (FIJ)	2:32.04
200 m individual medley	Lauren Sale (SAM)	2:24.12 NR	Matelita Buadromo (FIJ)	2:24.53	May Toven (NCL)	2:27.67
400 m individual medley	Maiana Flament (NCL)	5:13.91	Angeline Tregoat (TAH)	5:16.08	Rosemarie Rova (FIJ)	5:30.93
4 × 100 m freestyle relay	Fiji; Yolani Blake; Cheyenne Rova; Rosemarie Rova; Matelita Buadromo	3:58.24	New Caledonia; Armelle Hidrio; Julie Decaix; May Toven; Emma Terebo	4:00.56	Samoa; Lauren Sale; Andrea Schuster; Jelani Wetzell; Lushavel Stickland	4:00.90 NR
4 × 200 m freestyle relay	New Caledonia; May Toven; Julie Decaix; Maiana Flament; Emma Terebo	8:53.06	Samoa; Jelani Wetzell; Andrea Schuster; Kaiya Brown; Lauren Sale	8:58.24 NR	Fiji; Yolani Blake; Cheyenne Rova; Marion Kotobalavu; Rosemarie Rova	9:26.85
4 × 100 m medley relay	New Caledonia; Emma Terebo; May Toven; Julie Decaix; Armelle Hidrio	4:27.32 NR	Fiji; Cheyenne Rova; Moana Wind; Matelita Buadromo; Yolani Blake	4:27.78 NR	Tahiti; Angeline Tregoat; Poerani Bertrand; Alizee Diaz; Reva Reignier	4:35.58 NR
5 km open water	Charlotte Robin (NCL)	1:10:40	Maiana Flament (NCL)	1:11:41	Matelita Buadromo (FIJ)	1:19:27
GR Games record for the Pacific Games/South Pacific Games

=== Mixed ===
Event	Gold		Silver		Bronze	
4 × 50 m freestyle relay	New Caledonia; Julien-Pierre Goyetche; Armelle Hidrio; Emma Terebo; Florent Janin	1:39.79 GR, NR	Fiji; Netani Ross; Epeli Rabua; Cheyenne Rova; Yolani Blake	1:40.89	Tahiti; Nicolas Vermorel; Teiki Dupont; Angeline Tregoat; Reva Reignier	1:41.67 NR
4 × 50 m medley relay	New Caledonia; Emma Terebo; Thomas Oswald; May Toven; Florent Janin	1:49.18 GR, NR	Fiji; Netani Ross; Taichi Vakasama; Matelita Buadromo; Yolani Blake	1:51.81 NR	Tahiti	1:53.33 NR
GR Games record for the Pacific Games/South Pacific Games

== See also ==
- Swimming at the Pacific Games
