= Swimming at the 2015 Pacific Games =

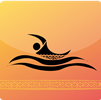
- Swimming pictogram for the Games
- Venue: Taurama Aquatic & Indoor Centre, Port Moresby
- Dates: 6–12 July

Swimming at the 2015 Pacific Games was held in Port Moresby, Papua New Guinea on 6–12 July 2015. The women's events were dominated by New Caledonia's Lara Grangeon who won eight individual gold medals and was a team member in four gold medal-winning relays. Papua New Guinea's Ryan Pini won six individual gold medals in the men's events and was a team member in the gold medal-winning mixed 4×50 metre medley relay.

== Event schedule ==
The forty events in the pool, nineteen each for men and women plus two mixed relays, were spread over six days at the Taurama Pool, with heats held in the morning sessions, followed by the finals in the evenings.

Mon. 6 July	Tue. 7 July	Wed. 8 July	Thu. 9 July	Fri. 10 July	Sat. 11 July
50 back (M); 100 free (W); 200 free (M); 400 I.M. (W); 100 breast (M); 4 × 100 free (W); 4 × 100 free (M)	50 back (W); 100 fly (M); 200 free (W); 400 I.M. (M); 200 breast (W); 4 × 200 free (M)	100 back (W); 100 free (M); 400 free (W); 50 breast (M); 50 breast (W); 400 free (M); 4 × 50 medley (Mix)	50 fly (M); 100 breast (W); 200 breast (M); 50 fly (W); 200 I.M. (M); 800 free (W); 4 × 50 free (Mix)	50 free (M); 200 I.M. (W); 200 fly (M); 100 fly (W); 100 back (M); 4 × 200 free (W)	50 free (W); 200 fly (W); 200 back (M); 200 back (W); 1500 free (M); 4 × 100 medley (W); 4 × 100 medley (M)

The men's and women's open water race events were scheduled for Sunday, 12 July at the Loloata Resort. (Note: The open water race distance was reduced from 5km to 3km due to safety concerns because of a receding tide. The start was delayed after storms overnight had interfered with the course preparation.)

== Medal summary ==
=== Medal table ===
* Host nation (Papua New Guinea)

Rank	Nation	Gold	Silver	Bronze	Total
1	New Caledonia	21	7	16	44
2	Tahiti	8	9	6	23
3	Papua New Guinea*	7	7	10	24
4	Tonga	3	0	0	3
5	Guam	2	3	1	6
6	Fiji	1	15	8	24
7	Samoa	0	1	1	2
Totals (7 entries)		42	42	42	126

=== Men's ===
Event	Gold		Silver		Bronze		Refs
50m Freestyle	Ryan Pini (PNG)	23.10 GR	Stéphane Debaere (TAH)	23.24	Hugo Lambert (TAH)	23.29	
100m Freestyle	Ryan Pini (PNG)	50.62	Stéphane Debaere (TAH)	51.40	Hugo Lambert (TAH)	51.41	
200m Freestyle	Rahiti De Vos (TAH)	1:51.87	Hugo Lambert (TAH)	1:52.93	Jeremie Dufourmantelle (NCL)	1:54.06	
400m Freestyle	Rahiti De Vos (TAH)	3:56.82 GR	Hugo Lambert (TAH)	4:02.90	Jeremie Dufourmantelle (NCL)	4:04.96	
1500m Freestyle	Rahiti De Vos (TAH)	15:50.16 GR	Jeremie Dufourmantelle (NCL)	16:17.52	Sheldon Plummer (PNG)	18:02.31	
50m Backstroke	Ryan Pini (PNG)	26.14	Teiki Dupont (TAH)	26.98	Julien Pierre-Goyetche (NCL)	27.24	
100m Backstroke	Ryan Pini (PNG)	56.00	Teiki Dupont (TAH)	58.18	Julien Pierre-Goyetche (NCL)	58.81	
200m Backstroke	Teiki Dupont (TAH)	2:09.19	Hugo Tormento (NCL)	2:11.78	Brandon Schuster (SAM)	2:14.61	
50m Breaststroke	Amini Fonua (TGA)	28.20 GR	Stéphane Debaere (TAH)	28.81	Rainui Teriipaia (TAH)	29.11	
100m Breaststroke	Amini Fonua (TGA)	1:02.95 GR	Benjamin Schulte (GUM)	1:03.42	Rainui Teriipaia (TAH)	1:03.46	
200m Breaststroke	Amini Fonua (TGA)	2:20.27	Ryan Maskelyne (PNG)	2:21.22	Benjamin Schulte (GUM)	2:22.29	
50m Butterfly	Ryan Pini (PNG)	23.93 GR	Stéphane Debaere (TAH)	24.69	Hugo Lambert (TAH)	25.27	
100m Butterfly	Ryan Pini (PNG)	53.42 GR	Samuel Seghers (PNG)	55.49	Rahiti De Vos (TAH)	56.42	
200m Butterfly	Rahiti De Vos (TAH)	2:04.23	Thibaut Mary (NCL)	2:06.32	Hugo Tormento (NCL)	2:07.19	
200m I.M.	Benjamin Schulte (GUM)	2:09.22	Thibaut Mary (NCL)	2:10.67	Emmanuel Limozin (NCL)	2:12.36	
400m I.M	Benjamin Schulte (GUM)	4:39.11	Brandon Schuster (SAM)	4:39.29	Hugo Tormento (NCL)	4:43.71	
4 × 100 m Freestyle relay	(French Polynesia) Tahiti; Stéphane Debaere; Hugo Lambert; Rahiti De Vos; Anthony Clark	3:25.02 GR	New Caledonia; Julien-Pierre Goyetche; Hugo Ricarrere; Jeremie Dufourmantelle; Emmanuel Limozin	3:27.66	Papua New Guinea; Samuel Seghers; Leo Biggs; Stanford Kawale; Ryan Pini	3:28.02	
4 × 200 m Freestyle relay	(French Polynesia) Tahiti; Hugo Lambert; Rahiti De Vos; Stéphane Debaere; Anthony Clark	7:37.50 GR	New Caledonia; Emmanuel Limozin; Thibaut Mary; Jeremie Dufourmantelle; Hugo Tormento	7:43.87	Papua New Guinea; Samuel Seghers; Stanford Kawale; Shannon Liew; Ryan Pini	8:06.45	
4 × 100 m Medley relay	(French Polynesia) Tahiti; Teiki Dupont; Rainui Teriipaia; Hugo Lambert; Stéphane Debaere	3:48.40	Papua New Guinea; Ryan Pini; Ryan Maskelyne; Samuel Seghers; Stanford Kawale	3:49.53	New Caledonia; Julien-Pierre Goyetche; Thomas Oswald; Thibaut Mar; Emmanuel Limozin	3:51.53	
3 km Open water	Thibaut Mary (NCL)	40:49.66	Rahiti De Vos (TAH)	40:52.18	Jeremie Dufourmantelle (NCL)	40:55.28	
GR Games record for the Pacific Games/South Pacific Games

=== Women's ===
Event	Gold		Silver		Bronze		Refs
50m Freestyle	Emma Terebo (NCL)	26.26 GR	Caroline Puamau (FIJ)	26.70	Anna-Liza Mopio-Jane (PNG)	27.25	
100m Freestyle	Emma Terebo (NCL)	57.46	Matelita Buadromo (FIJ)	58.29	Caroline Puamau (FIJ)	58.90	
200m Freestyle	Lara Grangeon (NCL)	2:03.77 GR	Matelita Buadromo (FIJ)	2:08.41	Lea Ricarrere (NCL)	2:13.21	
400m Freestyle	Lara Grangeon (NCL)	4:20.40 GR	Matelita Buadromo (FIJ)	4:36.00	Charlotte Robin (NCL)	4:41.97	
800m Freestyle	Lara Grangeon (NCL)	8:52.99 GR	Matelita Buadromo (FIJ)	9:33.71	Charlotte Robin (NCL)	9:38.80	
50m Backstroke	Emma Terebo (NCL)	29.18 GR	Caroline Puamau (FIJ)	29.83	Suzanne Afchain (NCL)	31.14	
100m Backstroke	Emma Terebo (NCL)	1:02.60 GR	Suzanne Afchain (NCL)	1:08.45	Cheyenne Rova (FIJ)	1:08.59	
200m Backstroke	Cheyenne Rova (FIJ)	2:30.00	Savannah Tkatchenko (PNG)	2:31.90	Brooke Smith (FIJ)	2:34.27	
50m Breaststroke	Adeline Williams (NCL)	32.61	Pilar Shimizu (GUM)	33.35	Savannah Tkatchenko (PNG)	34.60	
100m Breaststroke	Adeline Williams (NCL)	1:11.05 GR	Pilar Shimizu (GUM)	1:16.05	Savannah Tkatchenko (PNG)	1:16.96	
200m Breaststroke	Lara Grangeon (NCL)	2:33.20 GR	Tegan McCarthy (PNG)	2:44.95	Savannah Tkatchenko (PNG)	2:45.23	
50m Butterfly	Emma Terebo (NCL)	28.44	Caroline Puamau (FIJ)	28.61 NR	Matelita Buadromo (FIJ)	28.71	
100m Butterfly	Lara Grangeon (NCL)	1:06.00	Tieri Erasito (FIJ)	1:08.02	Adi Naivalu (FIJ)	1:08.06	
200m Butterfly	Lara Grangeon (NCL)	2:11.89 GR	Tieri Erasito (FIJ)	2:30.34	Rosemarie Rova (FIJ)	2:34.24	
200m I.M.	Lara Grangeon (NCL)	2:17.84	Matelita Buadromo (FIJ)	2:27.22	Savannah Tkatchenko (PNG)	2:29.82	
400m I.M	Lara Grangeon (NCL)	4:47.07 GR	Matelita Buadromo (FIJ)	5:24.09	Lou Pujol (NCL)	5:26.82	
4 × 100 m Freestyle relay	New Caledonia; Lea Ricarrere; Emma Terebo; Armelle Hidrio; Lara Grangeon	3:57.23 GR	Fiji; Adi Naivalu; Cheyenne Rova; Caroline Puamau; Matelita Buadromo	3:57.92	Papua New Guinea; Savannah Tkatchenko; Ebony Tkatchenko; Barbara Vali-Skelton; Anna-Liza Mopio-Jane	4:11.52	
4 × 200 m Freestyle relay	New Caledonia; Suzanne Afchain; Lara Grangeon; Emma Terebo; Lea Ricarrere	8:51.55	Fiji; Adi Naivalu; Caroline Puamau; Cheyenne Rova; Rosemarie Rova	9:06.12	Papua New Guinea; Milly Knight; Jocelyn Flynn; Jean Koupa; Anna-Liza Mopio-Jane	9:12.16	
4 × 100 m Medley relay	New Caledonia; Emma Terebo; Adeline Williams; Lara Grangeon; Armelle Hidrio	4:23.64 GR	Papua New Guinea; Shanice Paraka; Savannah Tkatchenko; Tegan McCarthy; Anna-Liza Mopio-Jane	4:38.31	Fiji; Iris Pene; Amy McGowan; Adi Naivalu; Rosemarie Rova	4:46.40	
3 km Open water	Charlotte Robin (NCL)	47:13.25	Matelita Buadromo (FIJ)	49:02.72	Leilani Flament (NCL)	49:03.83	
GR Games record for the Pacific Games/South Pacific Games

=== Mixed ===
Event	Gold		Silver		Bronze		Refs
4x50m Freestyle relay	Papua New Guinea; Anna-Liza Mopio-Jane; Samuel Seghers; Savannah Tkatchenko; Ryan Pini	1:40.02 GR	Fiji; Meli Malani; Carl Probert; Yolani Blake; Caroline Puamau	1:40.45	New Caledonia; Emma Terebo; Emmanuel Limozin; Armelle Hidrio; Julien-Pierre Goyetche	1:40.57	
4x50m Medley relay	New Caledonia; Emma Terebo; Adeline Williams; Thibaut Mary; Julien-Pierre Goyetche	1:49.94 GR	Papua New Guinea; Ryan Pini (25.95 GR); Barbara Vali-Skelton; Samuel Seghers; Anna-Liza Mopio-Jane	1:52.04	Fiji; Adi Kinisimer Maivalu; Matelita Buadromo; Meli Malani; Carl Probert	1:54.18	
GR Games record for the Pacific Games/South Pacific Games

== Sources ==
- 2015 Pacific Games Swimming Results (PDF 0.7 MB). Sports TG (Report). Archived from the original on 25 September 2017.
