= List of Palauan records in swimming =

The Palauan records in swimming are the fastest ever performances of swimmers from Palau, which are recognised and ratified by the Palau Swimming Association.

All records were set in finals unless noted otherwise.

== Long Course (50 m) ==
=== Men ===
Event	Time		Name	Club	Date	Meet	Location	Ref
50 m freestyle	24.72	h	Kazuumi Nestor	Palau	11 May 2026	Oceania Championships	Suva, Fiji	
100 m freestyle	54.10	h	Noel Keane	Palau	24 July 2019	World Championships	Gwangju, South Korea	
200 m freestyle	1:59.77		Noel Keane	Palau	11 July 2019	Pacific Games	Apia, Samoa	
400 m freestyle	4:18.65		Noel Keane	Palau	13 July 2019	Pacific Games	Apia, Samoa	
800 m freestyle	9:12.19	†	Noel Keane	Palau	12 July 2019	Pacific Games	Apia, Samoa	
1500 m freestyle	17:20.61		Noel Keane	Palau	12 July 2019	Pacific Games	Apia, Samoa	
50 m backstroke	28.24	h	Kazuumi Nestor	Palau	9 May 2026	Oceania Championships	Suva, Fiji	
100 m backstroke	1:01.58	h	Kazuumi Nestor	Palau	8 May 2026	Oceania Championships	Suva, Fiji	
200 m backstroke	2:23.21	h	Kazuumi Nestor	Palau	10 May 2026	Oceania Championships	Suva, Fiji	
50 m breaststroke	31.53	h	Jion Hosei	Palau	10 May 2026	Oceania Championships	Suva, Fiji	
100 m breaststroke	1:11.18	h	Jion Hosei	Palau	9 May 2026	Oceania Championships	Suva, Fiji	
200 m breaststroke	2:40.70		Noel Keane	Palau	9 July 2019	Pacific Games	Apia, Samoa	
50 m butterfly	26.56	h	Kazuumi Nestor	Palau	27 July 2025	World Championships	Singapore, Singapore	
100 m butterfly	59.85		Noel Keane	Palau	10 July 2019	Pacific Games	Apia, Samoa	
200 m butterfly	2:23.21			-				
200 m individual medley	2:16.11	h	Noel Keane	Palau	12 July 2019	Pacific Games	Apia, Samoa	
400 m individual medley	4:50.59		Noel Keane	Palau				
4×100 m freestyle relay	3:41.84		Jion Hosei (56.55); Travis Sakurai (56.97); Charlie Gibbons (53.95); Kazuumi Nestor (54.37)	Palau	10 May 2026	Oceania Championships	Suva, Fiji	
4×200 m freestyle relay	8:42.98		Charlie Gibbons; Kazuumi Nestor; Travis Sakurai; Jion Hosei	Palau	9 May 2026	Oceania Championships	Suva, Fiji	
4×100 m medley relay	4:15.83		Kazuumi Nestor (1:03.76); Jion Hosei (1:12.29); Charlie Gibbons (1:02.43); Travis Sakurai (57.35)	Palau	11 May 2026	Oceania Championships	Suva, Fiji	

Legend: # – Record awaiting ratification by Palau Swimming Association; WR – World record; OC – Oceanian record;
Records not set in finals: h – heat; sf – semifinal; r – relay 1st leg; rh – relay heat 1st leg; b – B final; † – en route to final mark; so – swim-off; tt – time trial

=== Women ===
Event	Time		Name	Club	Date	Meet	Location	Ref
50 m freestyle	27.99		Nicole Hayes	-	2001			
100 m freestyle	1:00.40		Nicole Hayes	-	2001			
200 m freestyle	2:11.01		Nicole Hayes	-	2001			
400 m freestyle	5:02.28		Osisang Chilton	Palau	28 June 2018	Oceania Championships	Port Moresby, Papua New Guinea	
800 m freestyle	10:28.54		Osisang Chilton	Palau	29 June 2018	Oceania Championships	Port Moresby, Papua New Guinea	
1500 m freestyle	20:06.36		Osisang Chilton	Palau		-		
50 m backstroke	32.93		Nicole Hayes	-		-		
100 m backstroke	1:16.55	h	Osisang Chilton	Palau	22 July 2019	World Championships	Gwangju, South Korea	
200 m backstroke	2:46.60	h	Osisang Chilton	Palau	28 July 2017	World Championships	Budapest, Hungary	
50 m breaststroke	38.60		Romellen Maidoo	Palau	14 March 2015	SSC International Meet	Saipan, Northern Mariana Islands	
100 m breaststroke	1:26.54	h	Hanna Ruluked	Palau	21 August 2025	World Junior Championships	Otopeni, Romania	
200 m breaststroke	3:16.59		Romellen Maidoo	Palau	13 March 2015	SSC International Meet	Saipan, Northern Mariana Islands	
50 m butterfly	30.60	h	Dirngulbai Misech	Palau	9 July 2019	Pacific Games	Apia, Samoa	
100 m butterfly	1:10.22		Nicole Hayes	-	2002			
200 m butterfly	2:51.25		Osisang Chilton	-	2016			
200 m individual medley	2:36.77		Nicole Hayes	-		-		
400 m individual medley	6:09.08		Osisang Chilton	Palau		-		
4×50 m freestyle relay	2:05.72		Roylin Akiwo; Romellen Maidoo; Rhema Joy Maido; Dirngulbai Misech	Palau	14 March 2015	SSC International Meet	Saipan, Northern Mariana Islands	
4×100 m freestyle relay	4:46.19			-	2002			
4×200 m freestyle relay	10:29.97			-	2002			
4×50 m medley relay	2:25.21		Roylin Akiwo; Romellen Maidoo; Dirngulbai Misech; Berneace Balayo	Palau	13 March 2015	SSC International Meet	Saipan, Northern Mariana Islands	
4×100 m medley relay	5:25.83		Roylin Akiwo; Romellen Maidoo; Dirngulbai Misech; Rhema Joy Maido	Palau	12 March 2015	SSC International Meet	Saipan, Northern Mariana Islands	

Legend: # – Record awaiting ratification by Palau Swimming Association; WR – World record; OC – Oceanian record;
Records not set in finals: h – heat; sf – semifinal; r – relay 1st leg; rh – relay heat 1st leg; b – B final; † – en route to final mark; so – swim-off; tt – time trial

=== Mixed relay ===
Event	Time	Name	Club	Date	Meet	Location	Ref
4×50 m freestyle relay	1:51.48	Dirngulbai Misech; Shawn Dingilius-Wallace; Osisang Chilton; Noel Keane	Palau	12 July 2019	Pacific Games	Apia, Samoa	
4×100 m freestyle relay	4:16.70	Noel Keane (1:03.03); Dirngulbai Misech (1:06.37); Shawn Dingilius-Wallace (59.44); Osisang Chilton (1:07.86)	Palau	24 June 2016	Oceania Championships	Suva, Fiji	
4×50 m medley relay	2:07.23		Palau	13 July 2019	Pacific Games	Apia, Samoa	
4×100 m medley relay	4:54.60	Roylin Akiwo (1:19.69); Malcolm Shae Gaymann (1:19.95); Dirngulbai Misech (1:14.97); Shawn Dingilius-Wallace (59.99)	Palau	21 June 2016	Oceania Championships	Suva, Fiji	

Legend: # – Record awaiting ratification by Palau Swimming Association; WR – World record; OC – Oceanian record;
Records not set in finals: h – heat; so – swim-off

== Short Course (25 m) ==
=== Men ===
Event	Time		Name	Club	Date	Meet	Location	Ref
50 m freestyle	24.20	h	Kazuumi Nestor	Palau	14 December 2024	World Championships	Budapest, Hungary	
100 m freestyle	53.32	h	Noel Keane	Palau	3 July 2025	Pacific Mini Games	Koror, Palau	
200 m freestyle	1:56.72	h	Noel Keane	Palau	12 December 2018	World Championships	Hangzhou, China	
400 m freestyle	4:24.80		Travis Sakurai	Palau	30 June 2025	Pacific Mini Games	Koror, Palau	
800 m freestyle	9:22.25		Noel Keane	-	30 June 2017	-		
1500 m freestyle	17:42.52		Noel Keane	-	19 June 2019	Belau Game	Koror, Palau	
50 m backstroke	26.40		Kazuumi Nestor	Palau	30 July 2025	Pacific Mini Games	Koror, Palau	
100 m backstroke	56.88		Kazuumi Nestor	Palau	4 July 2025	Pacific Mini Games	Koror, Palau	
200 m backstroke	2:10.60		Kazuumi Nestor	Palau	2 July 2025	Pacific Mini Games	Koror, Palau	
50 m breaststroke	30.93	h	Jion Hosei	Palau	1 July 2025	Pacific Mini Games	Koror, Palau	
100 m breaststroke	1:07.44	h	Jion Hosei	Palau	2 July 2025	Pacific Mini Games	Koror, Palau	
200 m breaststroke	2:32.42	h	Jion Hosei	Palau	30 June 2025	Pacific Mini Games	Koror, Palau	
50 m butterfly	26.34	h	Noel Keane	Palau	2 July 2025	Pacific Mini Games	Koror, Palau	
100 m butterfly	58.02	h	Kazuumi Nestor	Palau	1 July 2025	Pacific Mini Games	Koror, Palau	
200 m butterfly	2:12.07		Kazuumi Nestor	Palau	3 July 2025	Pacific Mini Games	Koror, Palau	
100 m individual medley	59.32		Kazuumi Nestor	Palau	30 June 2025	Pacific Mini Games	Koror, Palau	
200 m individual medley	2:16.83		Noel Keane	Palau	6 April 2019	Micronesian National Championships	Koror, Palau	
400 m individual medley	4:54.86		Noel Keane	-	20 June 2019	Belau Game	Koror, Palau	
4×50 m freestyle relay	1:47.94			Palau	2021	-		
4×100 m freestyle relay	3:34.94		Travis Sakurai; Jion Hosei; Noel Kean; Kazuumi Nestor	Palau	30 June 2025	Pacific Mini Games	Koror, Palau	
4×200 m freestyle relay	7:57.33		Travis Sakurai; Kazuumi Nestor; Charlie Gibbons; Noel Kean	Palau	2 July 2025	Pacific Mini Games	Koror, Palau	
4×50 m medley relay	2:01.63			Palau	2021	-		
4×100 m medley relay	4:00.75		Kazuumi Nestor; Jion Hosei; Charlie Gibbons; Noel Kean	Palau	4 July 2025	Pacific Mini Games	Koror, Palau	

Legend: # – Record awaiting ratification by Palau Swimming Association; WR – World record; OC – Oceanian record;
Records not set in finals: h – heat; sf – semifinal; r – relay 1st leg; rh – relay heat 1st leg; b – B final; † – en route to final mark; so – swim-off; tt – time trial

=== Women ===
Event	Time		Name	Club	Date	Meet	Location	Ref
50 m freestyle	28.53		Nicole Hayes	-	27 July 2002	-		
100 m freestyle	1:01.50	h	Dirngulbai Misech	Palau	12 December 2018	World Championships	Hangzhou, China	
200 m freestyle	2:19.69		Dirngulbai Misech	-	21 June 2019	Belau Game	Koror, Palau	
400 m freestyle	4:47.14		Nicole Hayes	-	7 August 1998	-		
800 m freestyle	10:15.29	h	Osisang Chilton	Palau	7 December 2016	World Championships	Windsor, Canada	
1500 m freestyle	20:22.80		Osisang Chilton	-	6 April 2019	-		
50m backstroke	33.20		Dirngulbai Misech	-	21 June 2019	Belau Game	Koror, Palau	
100 m backstroke	1:12.10	h	Osisang Chilton	Palau	11 December 2018	World Championships	Hangzhou, China	
200 m backstroke	2:39.50	h	Osisang Chilton	Palau	8 December 2016	World Championships	Windsor, Canada	
50 m breaststroke	37.45		-	-		-		
100 m breaststroke	1:23.98		-	-		-		
200 m breaststroke	3:01.41		-	-		-		
50 m butterfly	30.60	h	Dirngulbai Misech	Palau	18 December 2021	World Championships	Abu Dhabi, United Arab Emirates	
100 m butterfly	1:08.44	h	Dirngulbai Misech	Palau	15 December 2018	World Championships	Hangzhou, China	
200 m butterfly	2:59.23		Dirngulbai Misech	-	25 June 2015	-		
100 m individual medley	1:14.56	h	Hanna Ruluked	Palau	30 June 2025	Pacific Mini Games	Koror, Palau	
200 m individual medley	2:35.20	h	Nicole Hayes	-	8 August 1998	-		
400 m individual medley	5:27.21		Nicole Hayes	-		-		
4×50 m freestyle relay								
4×100 m freestyle relay								
4×200 m freestyle relay								
4×50 m medley relay								
4×100 m medley relay								

Legend: # – Record awaiting ratification by Palau Swimming Association; WR – World record; OC – Oceanian record;
Records not set in finals: h – heat; sf – semifinal; r – relay 1st leg; rh – relay heat 1st leg; b – B final; † – en route to final mark; so – swim-off; tt – time trial

=== Mixed relay ===
Event	Time	Name	Club	Date	Meet	Location	Ref
4×50 m freestyle relay	1:48.94	Kazuumi Nestor; Noel Kean; Yuri Hosei; Hanna Ruluked	Palau	3 July 2025	Pacific Mini Games	Koror, Palau	
4×50 m medley relay	1:59.48	Kazuumi Nestor; Jion Hosei; Hanna Ruluked; Yuri Hosei	Palau	1 July 2025	Pacific Mini Games	Koror, Palau	

Legend: # – Record awaiting ratification by Palau Swimming Association; WR – World record; OC – Oceanian record;
Records not set in finals: h – heat; sf – semifinal; r – relay 1st leg; rh – relay heat 1st leg; b – B final; † – en route to final mark; so – swim-off; tt – time trial
