= List of Cook Islands records in swimming =

The Cook Islands records in swimming are the fastest ever performances of swimmers from Cook Islands, which are recognised and ratified by the Cook Islands Aquatics Federation. Due to the lack of a swimming pool, only open water swimming is practiced in the Cook Islands.

All records were set in finals unless noted otherwise.

== Long Course (50 m) ==
=== Men ===
Event	Time		Name	Club	Date	Meet	Location	Ref
50 m freestyle	23.16		Wesley Roberts	Wests Illawarra	12 December 2020	NSW Senior State Age Championships	Sydney, Australia	
100 m freestyle	49.41	h	Wesley Roberts	Cook Islands	14 February 2024	World Championships	Doha, Qatar	
200 m freestyle	1:48.55	h	Wesley Roberts	Cook Islands	13 June 2021	Australian Olympic Trials	Adelaide, Australia	
400 m freestyle	3:52.50	h	Wesley Roberts	Cook Islands	12 June 2021	Australian Olympic Trials	Adelaide, Australia	
800 m freestyle	8:14.85	†	Wesley Roberts	Cook Islands	7 April 2017	New Zealand Championships	Auckland, New Zealand	
1500 m freestyle	15:33.41		Wesley Roberts	Cook Islands	7 April 2017	New Zealand Championships	Auckland, New Zealand	
50 m backstroke	27.05		Jacob Story	Mt Eden	15 April 2024	New Zealand Age Group Championships	Hawkes Bay, New Zealand	
100 m backstroke	58.38		Jacob Story	Mt Eden	12 December 2023	Queensland Championships	Brisbane, Australia	
200 m backstroke	2:11.64	h	Bede Aitu	Cook Islands	2 August 2022	Commonwealth Games	Birmingham, United Kingdom	
50 m breaststroke	28.40		Jacob Story	Cook Islands	11 April 2026	Australian Age Championships	Gold Coast, Australia	
100 m breaststroke	1:01.70		Jacob Story	Cook Islands	16 April 2026	Australian Age Championships	Gold Coast, Australia	
200 m breaststroke	2:14.41		Jacob Story	Cook Islands	14 April 2026	Australian Age Championships	Gold Coast, Australia	
50 m butterfly	24.67		Wesley Roberts	Cook Islands	23 November 2023	Pacific Games	Honiara, Solomon Islands	
100 m butterfly	55.52		Wesley Roberts	Cook Islands	20 November 2023	Pacific Games	Honiara, Solomon Islands	
200 m butterfly								
200 m individual medley	2:07.37		Jacob Story	Mt Eden	25 May 2025	New Zealand Championships	Auckland, New Zealand	
400 m individual medley	4:42.04		Jacob Story	Mt Eden	15 March 2024	Auckland Age Group & Open Championships	Auckland, New Zealand	
4×100 m freestyle relay								
4×200 m freestyle relay								
4×100 m medley relay								

Legend: # – Record awaiting ratification by Cook Islands Aquatics Federation; WR – World record; OC – Oceanian record;
Records not set in finals: h – heat; sf – semifinal; r – relay 1st leg; rh – relay heat 1st leg; b – B final; † – en route to final mark; so – swim-off; tt – time trial

=== Women ===
Event	Time		Name	Club	Date	Meet	Location	Ref
50 m freestyle	27.01		Tracy Keith-Matchitt	Cook Islands	24 June 2016	Oceania Championships	Suva, Fiji	
100 m freestyle	57.85	h	Tracy Keith-Matchitt	Cook Islands	6 August 2015	World Championships	Kazan, Russia	
200 m freestyle	2:11.40		Mia Laban	Howick Pakuranga	18 April 2024	New Zealand Age Group Championships	Hawkes Bay, New Zealand	
400 m freestyle	4:46.48		Mia Laban	Cook Islands	18 December 2023	Victorian Age Championship	Melbourne, Australia	
800 m freestyle								
1500 m freestyle								
50 m backstroke	31.36		Mia Laban	Howick Pakuranga	9 May 2026	Oceania Championships	Suva, Fiji	
100 m backstroke	1:06.69		Mia Laban	Howick Pakuranga	19 April 2024	New Zealand Age Group Championships	Hawkes Bay, New Zealand	
200 m backstroke	2:31.91		Mia Laban	Howick Pakuranga	22 April 2022	New Zealand Age Group Championships	Wellington, New Zealand	
50 m breaststroke	31.41	h, †	Lanihei Connolly	Cook Islands	28 July 2025	World Championships	Singapore, Singapore	
100 m breaststroke	1:07.40	h	Lanihei Connolly	Cook Islands	28 July 2025	World Championships	Singapore, Singapore	
200 m breaststroke	2:29.87	h	Lanihei Connolly	Cook Islands	31 July 2025	World Championships	Singapore, Singapore	
50 m butterfly	28.04	h	Lanihei Connolly	Cook Islands	8 May 2026	Oceania Championships	Suva, Fiji	
100 m butterfly	1:03.12	b	Mia Laban	United Swimming Club	15 May 2026	New Zealand Championships	Auckland, New Zealand	
200 m butterfly	2:27.66	h	Mia Laban	United Swimming Club	14 May 2026	New Zealand Championships	Auckland, New Zealand	
200 m individual medley	2:21.97	c	Lanihei Connolly	Howick Pakuranga	12 April 2023	New Zealand Age Group Championships	Auckland, New Zealand	
400 m individual medley	5:28.89		Mia Laban	Howick Pakuranga	17 April 2024	New Zealand Age Group Championships	Hawkes Bay, New Zealand	
4×100 m freestyle relay								
4×200 m freestyle relay								
4×100 m medley relay								

Legend: # – Record awaiting ratification by Cook Islands Aquatics Federation; WR – World record; OC – Oceanian record;
Records not set in finals: h – heat; sf – semifinal; r – relay 1st leg; rh – relay heat 1st leg; b – B final; † – en route to final mark; so – swim-off; tt – time trial

== Short Course (25 m) ==
=== Men ===
Event	Time		Name	Club	Date	Meet	Location	Ref
50 m freestyle	23.51	h, †	Wesley Roberts	Cook Islands	14 December 2022	World Championships	Melbourne, Australia	
100 m freestyle	49.59	h	Wesley Roberts	Cook Islands	14 December 2022	World Championships	Melbourne, Australia	
200 m freestyle	1:46.67	h	Wesley Roberts	Cook Islands	18 December 2022	World Championships	Melbourne, Australia	
400 m freestyle	3:49.36	h	Wesley Roberts	Cook Islands	24 October 2019	Australian Championships	Melbourne, Australia	
800 m freestyle	8:11.28	†	Wesley Roberts	Cook Islands	12 August 2017	World Cup	Eindhoven, Netherlands	
1500 m freestyle	15:27.36		Wesley Roberts	Cook Islands	12 August 2017	World Cup	Eindhoven, Netherlands	
50 m backstroke	27.01		Bede Aitu	TBSS Central City	26 August 2022	New Zealand Championships	Auckland, New Zealand	
100 m backstroke	58.36		Bede Aitu	TBSS Central City	23 August 2022	New Zealand Championships	Auckland, New Zealand	
200 m backstroke	2:06.49		Bede Aitu	TBSS Central City	25 August 2022	New Zealand Championships	Auckland, New Zealand	
50 m breaststroke	28.39	h	Jacob Story	Mt Eden	23 September 2025	New Zealand Championships	Auckland, New Zealand	
100 m breaststroke	1:01.69	h	Jacob Story	Mt Eden	24 September 2025	New Zealand Championships	Auckland, New Zealand	
200 m breaststroke	2:11.20	h	Jacob Story	Mt Eden	21 September 2025	New Zealand Championships	Auckland, New Zealand	
50 m butterfly	24.47	h	Jacob Story	Mt Eden	22 September 2025	New Zealand Championships	Auckland, New Zealand	
100 m butterfly								
200 m butterfly								
100 m individual medley	56.08		Jacob Story	Cook Islands	30 June 2025	Pacific Mini Games	Koror, Palau	
200 m individual medley	2:04.08		Jacob Story	Cook Islands	4 July 2025	Pacific Mini Games	Koror, Palau	
400 m individual medley	4:27.01		Jacob Story	Cook Islands	1 July 2025	Pacific Mini Games	Koror, Palau	
4×50 m freestyle relay								
4×100 m freestyle relay								
4×200 m freestyle relay								
4×50 m medley relay								
4×100 m medley relay								

Legend: # – Record awaiting ratification by Cook Islands Aquatics Federation; WR – World record; OC – Oceanian record;
Records not set in finals: h – heat; sf – semifinal; r – relay 1st leg; rh – relay heat 1st leg; b – B final; † – en route to final mark; so – swim-off; tt – time trial

=== Women ===
Event	Time		Name	Club	Date	Meet	Location	Ref
50 m freestyle	26.23	h	Tracy Keith-Matchitt	Cook Islands	6 December 2014	World Championships	Doha, Qatar	
100 m freestyle	56.64	h	Tracy Keith-Matchitt	Cook Islands	4 December 2014	World Championships	Doha, Qatar	
200 m freestyle	2:10.19	h	Mia Laban	Howick Pakuranga	24 September 2025	New Zealand Championships	Auckland, New Zealand	
400 m freestyle	4:38.05		Mia Laban	Howick Pakuranga	9 September 2023	WHL 400 and 50’s	Auckland, New Zealand	
800 m freestyle								
1500 m freestyle								
50 m backstroke	30.07		Mia Laban	Cook Islands	30 June 2025	Pacific Mini Games	Koror, Palau	
100 m backstroke	1:04.14		Mia Laban	Cook Islands	4 July 2025	Pacific Mini Games	Koror, Palau	
200 m backstroke	2:18.94		Mia Laban	Cook Islands	2 July 2025	Pacific Mini Games	Koror, Palau	
50 m breaststroke	30.96	h	Lanihei Connolly	Cook Islands	14 December 2024	World Championships	Budapest, Hungary	
100 m breaststroke	1:06.71	h	Lanihei Connolly	Cook Islands	29 September 2026	Australian Championships	Sydney, Australia	
200 m breaststroke	2:40.02		Lanihei Connolly	Baradene College	23 July 2021	New Zealand Secondary School Championships	Auckland, New Zealand	
50 m butterfly	28.41		Lanihei Connolly	TBSS Central City	6 July 2023	ASA Championships	Auckland, New Zealand	
100 m butterfly	1:03.50		Alicia Story	Cook Islands	23 September 2025	New Zealand Championships	Auckland, New Zealand	
200 m butterfly	2:27.67	h	Mia Laban	Howick Pakuranga	24 September 2025	New Zealand Championships	Auckland, New Zealand	
100 m individual medley	1:03.93		Lanihei Connolly	TBSS Central City	6 July 2023	ASA Championships	Auckland, New Zealand	
200 m individual medley	2:21.14		Lanihei Connolly	TBSS Central City	8 July 2023	ASA Championships	Auckland, New Zealand	
400 m individual medley	5:19.08		Mia Laban	Howick Pakuranga	17 June 2023	Mt Eden Lvl 1 & 2	Auckland, New Zealand	
4×50 m freestyle relay								
4×100 m freestyle relay								
4×200 m freestyle relay								
4×50 m medley relay								
4×100 m medley relay								

Legend: # – Record awaiting ratification by Cook Islands Aquatics Federation; WR – World record; OC – Oceanian record;
Records not set in finals: h – heat; sf – semifinal; r – relay 1st leg; rh – relay heat 1st leg; b – B final; † – en route to final mark; so – swim-off; tt – time trial
