= 2014 FINA World Swimming Championships (25 m) – Women's 200 metre freestyle =

Women's 200 metre freestyle at the 2014 FINA World Swimming Championships (25 m)
- Dates: 7 December
- Competitors: 80 from 57 nations
- Winning time: 1:50.78

Medalists
| gold medal | Sarah Sjöström | Sweden |
| silver medal | Katinka Hosszú | Hungary |
| bronze medal | Femke Heemskerk | Netherlands |

The women's 200 metre freestyle competition of the 2014 FINA World Swimming Championships (25 m) was held on 7 December.

== Records ==
Prior to the competition, the existing world and championship records were as follows.

| | Name | Nation | Time | Location | Date |
|---|---|---|---|---|---|
| World record | Federica Pellegrini | Italy | 1:51.17 | Istanbul | 13 December 2009 |
| Championship record | Camille Muffat | France | 1:52.29 | Dubai | 19 December 2010 |

The following records were established during the competition:

| Date | Event | Name | Nation | Time | Record |
|---|---|---|---|---|---|
| 7 December | Final | Sarah Sjöström | Sweden | 1:50.78 | WR, CR |

== Results ==
=== Heats ===
The heats were held at 10:49.

| Rank | Heat | Lane | Name | Nationality | Time | Notes |
|---|---|---|---|---|---|---|
| 1 | 8 | 4 | Femke Heemskerk | Netherlands | 1:52.54 | Q |
| 2 | 7 | 4 | Sarah Sjöström | Sweden | 1:52.60 | Q |
| 3 | 9 | 4 | Katinka Hosszú | Hungary | 1:52.73 | Q |
| 4 | 8 | 6 | Shannon Vreeland | United States | 1:53.81 | Q |
| 5 | 9 | 5 | Federica Pellegrini | Italy | 1:54.04 | Q |
| 6 | 7 | 5 | Charlotte Bonnet | France | 1:54.48 | Q |
| 7 | 8 | 5 | Veronika Popova | Russia | 1:54.63 | Q |
| 8 | 9 | 6 | Evelyn Verrasztó | Hungary | 1:54.80 | Q |
| 9 | 9 | 3 | Michelle Coleman | Sweden | 1:54.85 | |
| 9 | 9 | 8 | Siobhan-Marie O'Connor | Great Britain | 1:54.85 | |
| 11 | 8 | 3 | Kylie Palmer | Australia | 1:54.96 | |
| 12 | 8 | 2 | Shen Duo | China | 1:54.98 | |
| 13 | 9 | 2 | Leah Neale | Australia | 1:55.35 | |
| 14 | 9 | 1 | Chihiro Igarashi | Japan | 1:55.83 | |
| 15 | 7 | 7 | Alice Mizzau | Italy | 1:55.85 | |
| 16 | 6 | 1 | Katerine Savard | Canada | 1:55.87 | |
| 17 | 7 | 9 | Nina Rangelova | Bulgaria | 1:56.01 | |
| 18 | 7 | 3 | Katie Drabot | United States | 1:56.08 | |
| 19 | 8 | 1 | Tomomi Aoki | Japan | 1:56.17 | |
| 20 | 8 | 8 | Larissa Oliveira | Brazil | 1:56.49 | |
| 21 | 9 | 9 | Cecilie Johannessen | Norway | 1:56.73 | |
| 22 | 6 | 5 | Jazmin Carlin | Great Britain | 1:57.35 | |
| 23 | 9 | 0 | Jéssica Cavalheiro | Brazil | 1:57.37 | |
| 24 | 6 | 6 | Barbora Závadová | Czech Republic | 1:57.43 | |
| 25 | 7 | 1 | Marlene Huther | Germany | 1:57.65 | |
| 26 | 7 | 8 | Guo Junjun | China | 1:57.72 | |
| 27 | 7 | 6 | Lisa Zaiser | Austria | 1:57.78 | |
| 27 | 7 | 2 | Viktoriia Andreeva | Russia | 1:57.78 | |
| 29 | 9 | 7 | Daniela Schreiber | Germany | 1:57.89 | |
| 30 | 6 | 4 | Emily Overholt | Canada | 1:58.34 | |
| 31 | 5 | 4 | Claudia Hufnagl | Austria | 1:58.97 | |
| 32 | 6 | 7 | Susann Bjørnsen | Norway | 1:59.23 | |
| 33 | 8 | 7 | Rieneke Terink | Netherlands | 1:59.26 | |
| 34 | 7 | 0 | Danielle Villars | Switzerland | 1:59.37 | |
| 35 | 5 | 5 | Theodora Giareni | Greece | 1:59.59 | |
| 36 | 6 | 2 | Julia Hassler | Liechtenstein | 1:59.82 | |
| 37 | 6 | 9 | Erin Gallagher | South Africa | 2:00.28 | |
| 38 | 5 | 7 | Julie Meynen | Luxembourg | 2:00.50 | |
| 39 | 3 | 0 | Nguyễn Thị Ánh Viên | Vietnam | 2:00.53 | |
| 40 | 6 | 0 | Monique Olivier | Luxembourg | 2:01.14 | |
| 41 | 5 | 3 | Rene Warnes | South Africa | 2:01.49 | |
| 42 | 5 | 9 | Samantha Arévalo | Ecuador | 2:01.65 | |
| 43 | 6 | 8 | Anna Kolárová | Czech Republic | 2:02.03 | |
| 44 | 5 | 6 | Elisbet Gámez | Cuba | 2:02.18 | |
| 45 | 4 | 5 | Karen Torrez | Bolivia | 2:02.51 | |
| 46 | 3 | 3 | Machiko Raheem | Sri Lanka | 2:02.88 | |
| 47 | 5 | 1 | Ayumi Macías | Mexico | 2:02.95 | |
| 48 | 5 | 8 | Evangelio Dato | Philippines | 2:02.96 | |
| 49 | 5 | 2 | Jessica Cattaneo | Peru | 2:03.08 | |
| 50 | 5 | 0 | Tuana Bahtoğlu | Turkey | 2:03.39 | |
| 51 | 4 | 7 | Lani Cabrera | Barbados | 2:04.10 | |
| 52 | 4 | 2 | Cecilia Eysturdal | Faroe Islands | 2:04.86 | |
| 53 | 3 | 9 | Nguyễn Diệu Linh | Vietnam | 2:05.34 | |
| 54 | 4 | 3 | Erika García | Peru | 2:05.45 | |
| 55 | 4 | 4 | Rebeca Quinteros | El Salvador | 2:05.59 | |
| 56 | 3 | 5 | Defne Kurt | Turkey | 2:05.70 | |
| 57 | 3 | 8 | Matelita Buadromo | Fiji | 2:06.33 | |
| 58 | 3 | 4 | Elena Giovanninni | San Marino | 2:06.57 | |
| 59 | 4 | 0 | Ana Nóbrega | Angola | 2:07.23 | |
| 60 | 4 | 9 | Malavika Vishwanath | India | 2:07.60 | |
| 61 | 4 | 8 | Monika Vasilyan | Armenia | 2:07.66 | |
| 62 | 3 | 2 | Rebecca Maduro | Aruba | 2:07.68 | |
| 63 | 4 | 1 | Olivia de Maroussem | Mauritius | 2:07.91 | |
| 64 | 1 | 4 | Nadia Cubells | Andorra | 2:08.07 | |
| 65 | 2 | 4 | Tiara Anwar | Brunei | 2:08.15 | NR |
| 66 | 2 | 6 | Anna Manchenkova | Azerbaijan | 2:08.49 | |
| 67 | 2 | 0 | Maeform Borriello | Honduras | 2:09.12 | |
| 68 | 3 | 1 | Zabrina Holder | Barbados | 2:10.07 | |
| 69 | 2 | 8 | Yara Lima | Angola | 2:10.30 | |
| 70 | 3 | 7 | Anusha Mehta | India | 2:11.08 | |
| 71 | 2 | 7 | Anna-Liza Mopio-Jane | Papua New Guinea | 2:13.04 | |
| 72 | 2 | 2 | Samantha Roberts | Antigua and Barbuda | 2:13.19 | |
| 73 | 2 | 3 | Long Chi Wai | Macau | 2:13.20 | |
| 74 | 3 | 6 | Elisa Bernardi | San Marino | 2:14.88 | |
| 75 | 1 | 3 | San Khant Khant Su | Myanmar | 2:15.13 | |
| 76 | 2 | 1 | Fabiola Espinoza | Nicaragua | 2:15.73 | |
| 77 | 1 | 5 | Diana Basho | Albania | 2:17.25 | |
| 78 | 1 | 6 | Chamodi de Fonseka | Sri Lanka | 2:22.81 | |
| 79 | 1 | 7 | Dirngulbai Misech | Palau | 2:27.72 | |
| 80 | 1 | 2 | Aminath Shajan | Maldives | 2:28.41 | |
| — | 2 | 5 | Beatrice Felici | San Marino | | DNS |
| — | 2 | 9 | Debbie Chew | Guatemala | | DNS |
| — | 4 | 6 | Kimberly Buys | Belgium | | DNS |
| — | 6 | 3 | Jessica Camposano | Colombia | | DNS |
| — | 8 | 0 | Daryna Zevina | Ukraine | | DNS |
| — | 8 | 9 | Katarína Listopadová | Slovakia | | DNS |

=== Final ===
The final was held at 20:01.

| Rank | Lane | Name | Nationality | Time | Notes |
|---|---|---|---|---|---|
| 1st place, gold medalist(s) | 5 | Sarah Sjöström | Sweden | 1:50.78 | WR, CR |
| 2nd place, silver medalist(s) | 3 | Katinka Hosszú | Hungary | 1:51.18 | |
| 3rd place, bronze medalist(s) | 4 | Femke Heemskerk | Netherlands | 1:51.69 | |
| 4 | 1 | Veronika Popova | Russia | 1:52.84 | |
| 5 | 2 | Federica Pellegrini | Italy | 1:54.01 | |
| 6 | 7 | Charlotte Bonnet | France | 1:54.02 | |
| 7 | 6 | Shannon Vreeland | United States | 1:54.28 | |
| 8 | 8 | Evelyn Verrasztó | Hungary | 1:55.07 | |
