= 2014 FINA World Swimming Championships (25 m) – Women's 400 metre freestyle =

Women's 400 metre freestyle at the 2014 FINA World Swimming Championships (25 m)
- Dates: 5 December
- Competitors: 53 from 40 nations
- Winning time: 3:55.76

Medalists
gold medal	Mireia Belmonte	Spain
silver medal	Sharon van Rouwendaal	Netherlands
bronze medal	Zhang Yufei	China

The Women's 400 metre freestyle competition of the 2014 FINA World Swimming Championships (25 m) was held on 5 December.

== Records ==
Prior to the competition, the existing world and championship records were as follows.

	Name	Nation	Time	Location	Date
World record	Mireia Belmonte	Spain	3:54.52	Berlin	11 August 2013
Championship record	Katie Hoff	United States	3:57.07	Dubai	17 December 2010

The following records were established during the competition:

Date	Event	Name	Nation	Time	Record
5 December	Final	Mireia Belmonte	Spain	3:55.76	CR

== Results ==
=== Heats ===
The heats were held at 12:32.

Rank	Heat	Lane	Name	Nationality	Time	Notes
1	6	4	Mireia Belmonte	Spain	4:00.29	Q
2	5	4	Sharon van Rouwendaal	Netherlands	4:00.60	Q
3	5	8	Zhang Yufei	China	4:00.86	Q
4	6	6	Elizabeth Beisel	United States	4:01.33	Q
5	5	3	Jazmin Carlin	Great Britain	4:01.37	Q
6	5	5	Chihiro Igarashi	Japan	4:01.72	Q
7	5	6	Leah Neale	Australia	4:02.03	Q
8	6	9	Boglárka Kapás	Hungary	4:02.30	Q
9	4	3	Lindsay Vrooman	United States	4:02.63	
10	5	1	Kylie Palmer	Australia	4:02.86	
11	6	2	Sarah Köhler	Germany	4:03.59	
12	6	7	Hannah Miley	Great Britain	4:03.82	
13	4	5	Anja Klinar	Slovenia	4:04.24	
14	5	0	Julie Lauridsen	Denmark	4:04.88	
15	4	4	Chiara Masini Luccetti	Italy	4:05.01	
16	4	1	Emily Overholt	Canada	4:06.44	
17	6	3	Cao Yue	China	4:06.88	
18	4	2	Jéssica Cavalheiro	Brazil	4:07.19	
19	4	7	Gaja Natlačen	Slovenia	4:07.68	
20	4	6	Asami Chida	Japan	4:07.70	
21	5	7	Leonie Beck	Germany	4:08.15	
22	6	1	Julia Hassler	Liechtenstein	4:08.69	
23	4	8	Manuella Lyrio	Brazil	4:08.73	
24	3	6	Ayumi Macias	Mexico	4:09.76	
25	2	7	Nguyễn Thị Ánh Viên	Vietnam	4:09.80	
26	3	4	Claudia Hufnagl	Austria	4:11.07	
27	3	3	Inga Cryer	Iceland	4:11.61	
28	3	5	Monique Olivier	Luxembourg	4:11.96	
29	4	0	Yana Martynova	Russia	4:12.35	
29	4	9	Samantha Arévalo	Ecuador	4:12.35	
31	5	9	Joanna Evans	Bahamas	4:13.83	
32	6	0	Elena Sokolova	Russia	4:14.17	
33	2	2	Valerie Gruest	Guatemala	4:14.75	
34	3	2	Montserrat Ortuno	Mexico	4:15.49	
35	3	1	Elisbet Gamez	Cuba	4:17.51	
36	3	8	Veronika Kolníková	Slovakia	4:19.88	
37	2	3	Tuana Bahtoğl	Turkey	4:20.92	
38	2	5	Daniela Miyahara	Peru	4:22.39	
39	2	1	Lani Cabrera	Barbados	4:23.22	
40	3	0	Erika García	Peru	4:23.44	
41	2	6	Malavika Vishwanath	India	4:24.19	
42	3	7	Esra Kaçmaz	Turkey	4:26.15	
43	2	4	Cecilia Eystrudal	Faroe Islands	4:27.03	
44	3	9	Rebeca Quinteros	El Salvador	4:28.84	
45	2	8	Elena Giovanni	San Marino	4:29.13	
46	1	4	Yara Lima	Angola	4:33.79	
47	2	0	Anusha Sanjeev	India	4:35.47	
48	1	5	San Khant Khant Su	Myanmar	4:43.19	
49	1	3	Meryem Bada	Morocco	4:44.50	
50	1	6	Victoria Chentsova	Northern Mariana Islands	4:47.05	
51	1	7	Diana Basho	Albania	4:47.52	
52	1	2	Samantha Roberts	Antigua and Barbuda	4:59.52	
53	1	1	Chamodi de Fonseka	Sri Lanka	5:01.43	
—	2	9	Elisa Bernardi	San Marino		DNS
—	5	2	Rieneke Terink	Netherlands		DNS
—	6	5	Katinka Hosszú	Hungary		DNS
—	6	8	Diletta Carli	Italy		DNS

=== Final ===
The final was held at 19:45.

Rank	Lane	Name	Nationality	Time	Notes
1st place, gold medalist(s)	4	Mireia Belmonte	Spain	3:55.76	CR
2nd place, silver medalist(s)	5	Sharon van Rouwendaal	Netherlands	3:57.76	
3rd place, bronze medalist(s)	3	Zhang Yufei	China	3:59.51	
4	7	Chihiro Igarashi	Japan	3:59.59	
5	8	Boglárka Kapás	Hungary	4:00.27	
6	2	Jazmin Carlin	Great Britain	4:02.32	
7	6	Elizabeth Beisel	United States	4:03.83	
8	1	Leah Neale	Australia	4:06.45	
