= List of Northern Mariana Islands records in swimming =

The Northern Mariana Islands records in swimming are the fastest ever performances of swimmers from Northern Mariana Islands, which are recognised and ratified by the Northern Mariana Islands Swimming Federation.

All records were set in finals unless noted otherwise.

== Long Course (50 m) ==
=== Men ===
Event	Time		Name	Club	Date	Meet	Location	Ref
50 m freestyle	23.77	r	Juhn Tenorio	Northern Mariana Islands	10 May 2026	Oceania Championships	Suva, Fiji	
100 m freestyle	51.74		Jonathan Sakovich	-	1991	-		
200 m freestyle	1:50.90		Jonathan Sakovich	-	25 July 1993	USA Championships	Austin, United States	
400 m freestyle	3:52.66		Jonathan Sakovich	-	1994	-		
800 m freestyle	8:16.68	†	Jonathan Sakovich	-	1 April 1992	US Olympic Trials	Indianapolis, United States	
1500 m freestyle	15:27.31		Jonathan Sakovich	-	1995	-		
50 m backstroke	26.40		Isaiah Aleksenko	Northern Mariana Islands	9 May 2026	Oceania Championships	Suva, Fiji	
100 m backstroke	57.39		Isaiah Aleksenko	Northern Mariana Islands	8 May 2026	Oceania Championships	Suva, Fiji	
200 m backstroke	2:14.79		Juhn Tenorio	Northern Mariana Islands	22 November 2023	Pacific Games	Honiara, Solomon Islands	
50 m breaststroke	31.08	h	Kouki Watanabe	Northern Mariana Islands	9 May 2026	Oceania Championships	Suva, Fiji	
100 m breaststroke	1:07.29		Eli Wong	-	2012			
200 m breaststroke	2:23.35		Eli Wong	-	2011			
50m butterfly	24.60		Isaiah Aleksenko	Northern Mariana Islands	8 May 2026	Oceania Championships	Suva, Fiji	
100m butterfly	53.89		Isaiah Aleksenko	Northern Mariana Islands	10 May 2026	Oceania Championships	Suva, Fiji	
200m butterfly	2:05.86		Isaiah Aleksenko	Northern Mariana Islands	22 November 2023	Pacific Games	Honiara, Solomon Islands	
200m individual medley	2:09.59	h	Eli Wong	Northern Mariana Islands	31 July 2013	World Championships	Barcelona, Spain	
400m individual medley	4:42.00		Jonathan Sakovich	-	1989	-		
4×100m freestyle relay	3:38.17		Juhn Tenorio (54.46); Justin Ma (56.22); Moshe Sikkel (54.47); Isaiah Aleksenko (53.02)	Northern Mariana Islands	10 May 2026	Oceania Championships	Suva, Fiji	
4×200m freestyle relay	8:16.38		Isaiah Aleksenko (1:57.86); Taiyo Akimaru (2:02.72); Kean Pajarillaga (2:06.87); Juhn Tenorio (2:08.93)	Northern Mariana Islands	21 November 2023	Pacific Games	Honiara, Solomon Islands	
4×100m medley relay	3:59.97		Juhn Tenorio (59.85); Kouki Watanabe (1:10.12); Isaiah Aleksenko (54.88); Kean Pajarillaga (55.12)	Northern Mariana Islands	24 November 2023	Pacific Games	Honiara, Solomon Islands	

Legend: # – Record awaiting ratification by Northern Mariana Islands Swimming Federation; WR – World record; OC – Oceanian record;
Records not set in finals: h – heat; sf – semifinal; r – relay 1st leg; rh – relay heat 1st leg; b – B final; † – en route to final mark; so – swim-off; tt – time trial

=== Women ===
Event	Time		Name	Club	Date	Meet	Location	Ref
50m freestyle	28.78		Xenavee Pangelinan	-	2001			
100m freestyle	1:00.00		Xenavee Pangelinan	-	2002			
200m freestyle	2:14.52		Ayano Taira	-				
400m freestyle	4:44.15	h	Victoria Olegovna Chentsova	Northern Mariana Islands	2 August 2015	World Championships	Kazan, Russia	
800m freestyle	9:48.87	h	Victoria Olegovna Chentsova	Northern Mariana Islands	7 August 2015	World Championships	Kazan, Russia	
1500m freestyle	19:43.16		Victoria Olegovna Chentsova	Saipan	12 March 2015	SSC International Meet	Saipan, Northern Mariana Islands	
50m backstroke	31.76	h	Piper Raho	Northern Mariana Islands	30 July 2025	World Championships	Singapore, Singapore	
100m backstroke	1:12.34		Xenavee Pangelinan	-	1999			
200m backstroke	2:31.57		Xenavee Pangelinan	-	2000			
50m breaststroke	34.53	h	Maria Batallones	Northern Mariana Islands	2 August 2025	World Championships	Singapore, Singapore	
100m breaststroke	1:17.38	h	Maria Batallones	Northern Mariana Islands	28 July 2025	World Championships	Singapore, Singapore	
200m breaststroke	2:54.70		Xenavee Pangelinan	-	1999			
50m butterfly	29.75		Xenavee Pangelinan	-	2001			
100m butterfly	1:04.84		Xenavee Pangelinan	-	2002			
200m butterfly	2:25.48		Xenavee Pangelinan	-	2001			
200m individual medley	2:29.84		Xenavee Pangelinan	-	2001			
400m individual medley	5:14.84		Xenavee Pangelinan	-	2002			
4×50m freestyle relay	2:28.70		Amanda Poppe; Mineri Gomez; Athyllia San Gil	MSC	14 March 2015	SSC International Meet	Saipan, Northern Mariana Islands	
4×100m freestyle relay	4:23.50			-	2002			
4×200m freestyle relay	9:29.91			-	2002			
4×50m medley relay								
4×100m medley relay	5:08.64			-	2003			

Legend: # – Record awaiting ratification by Northern Mariana Islands Swimming Federation; WR – World record; OC – Oceanian record;
Records not set in finals: h – heat; sf – semifinal; r – relay 1st leg; rh – relay heat 1st leg; b – B final; † – en route to final mark; so – swim-off; tt – time trial

=== Mixed relay ===
Event	Time		Name	Club	Date	Meet	Location	Ref
4×50m freestyle relay	1:56.83		David Roberto; Jinju Thompson; Aika Watanabe; Juhn Tenorio	Northern Mariana Islands	12 July 2019	Pacific Games	Apia, Samoa	
4×100m freestyle relay								
4×50m medley relay	2:22.48		Victoria Chentsova; Kento Akimaru; Christian Geuel Villacrusis; Jin Ju Thompson	Saipan	13 March 2015	SSC International Meet	Saipan, Northern Mariana Islands	
4×100m medley relay	4:56.20	h	Juhn Tenorio (1:04.40); Lennosuke Suzuki (1:22.52); Aika Watanabe (1:18.18); Jin Ju Thompson (1:11.10)	Northern Mariana Islands	24 July 2019	World Championships	Gwangju, South Korea	

Legend: # – Record awaiting ratification by Northern Mariana Islands Swimming Federation; WR – World record; OC – Oceanian record;
Records not set in finals: h – heat; so – swim-off

== Short Course (25 m) ==
=== Men ===
Event	Time		Name	Club	Date	Meet	Location	Ref
50m freestyle	23.97	h	Juhn Tenorio	Northern Mariana Islands	18 December 2021	World Championships	Abu Dhabi, United Arab Emirates	
100m freestyle	53.72	h	Jinnosuke Suzuki	Northern Mariana Islands	20 December 2021	World Championships	Abu Dhabi, United Arab Emirates	
200m freestyle	2:06.54	h	Lennosuke Suzuki	Northern Mariana Islands	12 December 2018	World Championships	Hangzhou, China	
400 m freestyle								
800 m freestyle								
1500 m freestyle								
50 m backstroke	24.36	h	Isaiah Aleksenko	Northern Mariana Islands	30 June 2025	Pacific Mini Games	Koror, Palau	
100 m backstroke	52.55		Isaiah Aleksenko	Northern Mariana Islands	4 July 2025	Pacific Mini Games	Koror, Palau	
200 m backstroke								
50m breaststroke	30.09	h	Eliebenezer San Jose Wong	Northern Mariana Islands	15 December 2012	World Championships	Istanbul, Turkey	
100m breaststroke	1:05.03	h	Eliebenezer San Jose Wong	Northern Mariana Islands	12 December 2012	World Championships	Istanbul, Turkey	
200 m breaststroke								
50m butterfly	23.49		Isaiah Aleksenko	Tsunami Saipan	29 March 2024	Junior Olympic Cup	Tokyo, Japan	
100m butterfly	51.98		Isaiah Aleksenko	Tsunami Saipan	30 March 2024	Junior Olympic Cup	Tokyo, Japan	
200 m butterfly	1:58.52		Isaiah Aleksenko	Northern Mariana Islands	3 July 2025	Pacific Mini Games	Koror, Palau	
100m individual medley	55.25		Isaiah Aleksenko	Northern Mariana Islands	3 July 2025	Pacific Mini Games	Koror, Palau	
200m individual medley	2:05.84	h	Eliebenezer San Jose Wong	Northern Mariana Islands	14 December 2012	World Championships	Istanbul, Turkey	
400 m individual medley								
4×50 m freestyle relay								
4×100 m freestyle relay	3:31.56		Kean Pajarillaga; Justin Yao Ma; Michael Miller; Isaiah Aleksenko	Northern Mariana Islands	30 June 2025	Pacific Mini Games	Koror, Palau	
4×200 m freestyle relay	7:53.76		Isaiah Aleksenko; Justin Yao Ma; Moshe Sikkel; Kean Pajarillaga	Northern Mariana Islands	2 July 2025	Pacific Mini Games	Koror, Palau	
4×50 m medley relay								
4×100 m medley relay	3:48.83		Kean Pajarillaga; Kouki Watanabe; Isaiah Aleksenko; Moshe Sikkel	Northern Mariana Islands	4 July 2025	Pacific Mini Games	Koror, Palau	

Legend: # – Record awaiting ratification by Northern Mariana Islands Swimming Federation; WR – World record; OC – Oceanian record;
Records not set in finals: h – heat; sf – semifinal; r – relay 1st leg; rh – relay heat 1st leg; b – B final; † – en route to final mark; so – swim-off; tt – time trial

=== Women ===
Event	Time		Name	Club	Date	Meet	Location	Ref
50 m freestyle	29.89	h	Angel de Jesus	Northern Mariana Islands	11 December 2016	World Championships	Windsor, Canada	
100 m freestyle	1:06.30	h	Asaka Litulumar	Northern Mariana Islands	17 December 2021	World Championships	Abu Dhabi, United Arab Emirates	
200 m freestyle	2:20.00	h	Victoria Chentsova	Northern Mariana Islands	16 December 2012	World Championships	Istanbul, Turkey	
400m freestyle	4:47.05	h	Victoria Chentsova	Northern Mariana Islands	5 December 2014	World Championships	Doha, Qatar	
800m freestyle	9:55.15		Victoria Chentsova	Northern Mariana Islands	4 December 2014	World Championships	Doha, Qatar	
1500 m freestyle								
50m backstroke	33.85	h	Shoko Litulumar	Northern Mariana Islands	19 December 2021	World Championships	Abu Dhabi, United Arab Emirates	
100m backstroke	1:14.14	h	Victoria Olegovna Chentsova	Northern Mariana Islands	12 December 2012	World Championships	Istanbul, Turkey	
200m backstroke	2:58.74	h	Keanna Villagomez	Northern Mariana Islands	17 December 2010	World Championships	Dubai, United Arab Emirates	
50m breaststroke	41.15	h	Angel de Jesus	Northern Mariana Islands	6 December 2016	World Championships	Windsor, Canada	
100 m breaststroke								
200 m breaststroke								
50m butterfly	32.65	h	Angel de Jesus	Northern Mariana Islands	8 December 2016	World Championships	Windsor, Canada	
100 m butterfly								
200 m butterfly								
100m individual medley	1:16.88	h	Angel de Jesus	Northern Mariana Islands	8 December 2016	World Championships	Windsor, Canada	
200m individual medley	2:50.87	h	Angel de Jesus	Northern Mariana Islands	10 December 2016	World Championships	Windsor, Canada	
400 m individual medley								
4×50 m freestyle relay								
4×100 m freestyle relay	4:14.46		Piper Raho; Maria Guerrero; Shoko Litulumar; Maria Batallones	Northern Mariana Islands	30 June 2025	Pacific Mini Games	Koror, Palau	
4×200 m freestyle relay	9:34.62		Shoko Litulumar; Maria Guerrero; Piper Raho; Maria Batallones	Northern Mariana Islands	2 July 2025	Pacific Mini Games	Koror, Palau	
4×50 m medley relay								
4×100 m medley relay	4:40.20		Piper Raho; Maria Batallones; Maria Guerrero; Shoko Litulumar	Northern Mariana Islands	4 July 2025	Pacific Mini Games	Koror, Palau	

Legend: # – Record awaiting ratification by Northern Mariana Islands Swimming Federation; WR – World record; OC – Oceanian record;
Records not set in finals: h – heat; sf – semifinal; r – relay 1st leg; rh – relay heat 1st leg; b – B final; † – en route to final mark; so – swim-off; tt – time trial
