= List of Hawaiian records in swimming =

The Hawaiian records in swimming are the fastest ever performances of swimmers from Hawaii, which are maintained by Hawaiian Swimming. Hawaii is no official Fina member, but Hawaiian Swimming is the Local Swim Committee of USA Swimming that governs the sport of swimming in the geographical area of the state of Hawaii.

All records were set in finals unless noted otherwise.

== Long Course (50 m) ==
=== Men ===
Event	Time		Name	Club	Date	Meet	Location	Ref
50 m freestyle	23.30		Ilia Reyes	HAWA	25 June 2012			
100 m freestyle	50.65		Aukai Lileikis	Aulea	30 July 2015			
200 m freestyle	1:49.90		Aukai Lileikis	Aulea	30 July 2015			
400 m freestyle	3:55.42		Noa Sakamoto	KSC	8 August 2003			
800 m freestyle	8:14.47		Noa Sakamoto	KSC	15 June 2003			
1500 m freestyle	15:45.94		Marc Ferguson	Bows	8 August 1986			
50 m backstroke	26.77	tt	Zack West	Aulea	5 August 2022	Speedo Summer Junior National Championships	Irvine, United States	
100 m backstroke	55.89		Hongzhe Sun	IOL	8 July 2004			
200 m backstroke	1:59.67		Hongzhe Sun	IOL	11 July 2004			
50 m breaststroke	28.99	h	Amare San Diego	Hawaii	10 May 2026	Oceania Championships	Suva, Fiji	
100 m breaststroke	1:02.56		Jon Reiter	Aulea	3 April 2022	Fan Crippen Swim Meet of Champions	Mission Viejo, United States	
200 m breaststroke	2:15.78		Tom Caps	Aulea	30 July 2022	Futures Championships	Santa Clara, United States	
50m butterfly	25.36		Kevin Frifeldt	Hawaii	20 May 2014	Oceania Championships	Auckland, New Zealand	
100m butterfly	53.23		Randal Tom	Maui	24 April 2009			
200m butterfly	2:04.17		Noa Sakamoto	KSC	7 July 2004			
200m individual medley	2:04.29		Aukai Lileikis	Aulea	30 July 2015			
400m individual medley	4:29.60		Marc Ferguson	IOL	29 July 1990			
4×100m freestyle relay	1:33.98		Ilia Reyes; Allnutt; Pearce; Higley	UH	27 June 2009			
4×100m freestyle relay	3:29.77		Stack; Hirstein; Kaleoaloha; Urbano	KSC	26 June 2014			
4×200m freestyle relay	7:49.16		Phillips; Martell; Murakami; Thomas	PAQ	27 August 1979			
4×50m medley relay	1:45.95		Zack West; Tom Caps; James Lyon; Jonathan Reiter	Aulea	27 March 2021	ISCA International Senior Meet	Saint Petersburg, United States	
4×100m medley relay	3:53.17		Zack West; Tom Caps; James Lyon; Jonathan Reiter	Hawaii	22 May 2021	Oahu Swimming Dual Series #2	Kapolei, United States	

Legend: # – Record awaiting ratification by Hawaiian Swimming; e – equalled existing record;
Records not set in finals: h – heat; sf – semifinal; r – relay 1st leg; rh – relay heat 1st leg; b – B final; † – en route to final mark; so – swim-off; tt – time trial

=== Women ===
Event	Time	Name	Club	Date	Meet	Location	Ref
50m freestyle	26.26	Keiko Price	AAA	4 March 1995			
100m freestyle	56.18	Jasmine Mau	KSC	5 August 2013			
200m freestyle	2:02.40	Jasmine Mau	KSC	26 June 2014			
400m freestyle	4:12.22	Diane Williams	AUL	8 August 1985			
800m freestyle	8:41.46	Diane Williams	AUL	5 August 1985			
1500m freestyle	16:31.34	Diane Williams	AUL	9 August 1985			
50m backstroke	31.65	Lia Foster					
100m backstroke	1:03.76	Jasmine Mau	KSC	6 August 2014			
200m backstroke	2:18.97	Kaili Chun	AUL	5 August 1978			
50m breaststroke	33.50	Cara Jernigan					
100m breaststroke	1:11.45	Maile Lawson	Hawaii	27 June 2018	Oceania Championships	Port Moresby, Papua New Guinea	
200m breaststroke	2:32.41	Jeanne Childs	PAQ	20 July 1982			
50m butterfly	28.09	Grace Monahan	Hawaii	26 June 2018	Oceania Championships	Port Moresby, Papua New Guinea	
100m butterfly	1:00.83	Erin McNulty	UN	13 November 2015			
200m butterfly	2:16.20	Diane Kutsunai	AUL	20 August 1977			
200m individual medley	2:20.32	Nadine Takai	Bows	1 August 1987			
400m individual medley	4:55.57	Grace Monahan	Hawaii	27 June 2018	Oceania Championships	Port Moresby, Papua New Guinea	
4×50m freestyle relay	1:49.89	Jasmine Mau; Hayakawa; Harrison; Walton	KSC	8 March 2012			
4×100m freestyle relay	4:01.14	Harrison; Walton; Jasmine Mau; Nihipali	KSC	8 March 2012			
4×200m freestyle relay	8:37.01	Kimura; Jasmine Mau; Forsyth; Hayakawa	KSC	26 June 2014			
4×50m medley relay	2:00.14	Nihipali; Shigeta; Harrison; Jasmine Mau	KSC	17 July 2014			
4×100m medley relay	4:22.15	Nihipali; Hayakawa; Harrison; Jasmine Mau	KSC	26 June 2014			

Legend: # – Record awaiting ratification by Hawaiian Swimming; e – equalled existing record;
Records not set in finals: h – heat; sf – semifinal; r – relay 1st leg; rh – relay heat 1st leg; b – B final; † – en route to final mark; so – swim-off; tt – time trial

=== Mixed relay ===
Event	Time	Name	Club	Date	Meet	Location	Ref
4×50m freestyle relay	1:41.04	Joseph Ahia (24.62); Sydnee Whitty (26.34); Tyler Kawakami (23.71); Grace Monahan (26.37)	Hawaii	26 June 2018	Oceania Championships	Port Moresby, Papua New Guinea	
4×50m medley relay	1:54.80	Michael Petrides (28.00); Maile Lawson (33.96); Grace Monahan (28.49); Tyler Kawakami (24.35)	Hawaii	27 June 2018	Oceania Championships	Port Moresby, Papua New Guinea	
4×100m medley relay	4:09.02	Michael Petrides (59.57); Maile Lawson (1:13.76); Grace Monahan (1:02.42); Tyler Kawakami (53.27)	Hawaii	26 June 2018	Oceania Championships	Port Moresby, Papua New Guinea	

Legend: # – Record awaiting ratification by Papua New Guinea Swimming; WR – World record; OC – Oceanian record; e – equalled existing record;
Records not set in finals: h – heat; so – swim-off

== Short Course (25 m) ==
=== Men ===
Event	Time	Name	Club	Date	Meet	Location	Ref
50 m freestyle							
100 m freestyle							
200 m freestyle							
400 m freestyle							
800 m freestyle							
1500 m freestyle							
50 m backstroke							
100 m backstroke							
200 m backstroke							
50 m breaststroke							
100 m breaststroke							
200 m breaststroke							
50 m butterfly							
100 m butterfly							
200 m butterfly							
100 m individual medley							
200 m individual medley							
400 m individual medley							
4×50 m freestyle relay							
4×100 m freestyle relay							
4×200 m freestyle relay							
4×50 m medley relay							
4×100 m medley relay							

Legend: # – Record awaiting ratification by Hawaiian Swimming; e – equalled existing record;
Records not set in finals: h – heat; sf – semifinal; r – relay 1st leg; rh – relay heat 1st leg; b – B final; † – en route to final mark; so – swim-off; tt – time trial

=== Women ===
Event	Time	Name	Club	Date	Meet	Location	Ref
50 m freestyle							
100 m freestyle							
200 m freestyle							
400 m freestyle							
800 m freestyle							
1500 m freestyle							
50 m backstroke							
100 m backstroke							
200 m backstroke							
50 m breaststroke							
100 m breaststroke							
200 m breaststroke							
50 m butterfly							
100 m butterfly							
200 m butterfly							
100 m individual medley							
200 m individual medley							
400 m individual medley							
4×50 m freestyle relay							
4×100 m freestyle relay							
4×200 m freestyle relay							
4×50 m medley relay							
4×100 m medley relay							

Legend: # – Record awaiting ratification by Hawaiian Swimming; e – equalled existing record;
Records not set in finals: h – heat; sf – semifinal; r – relay 1st leg; rh – relay heat 1st leg; b – B final; † – en route to final mark; so – swim-off; tt – time trial
