= 2014 FINA World Swimming Championships (25 m) – Women's 100 metre freestyle =

Women's 100 metre freestyle at the 2014 FINA World Swimming Championships (25 m)
- Dates: 4 December (heats and semifinals); 5 December (final)
- Competitors: 112 from 80 nations
- Winning time: 51.37

Medalists
gold medal	Femke Heemskerk	Netherlands
silver medal	Sarah Sjöström	Sweden
bronze medal	Ranomi Kromowidjojo	Netherlands

The Women's 100 metre freestyle competition of the 2014 FINA World Swimming Championships (25 m) was held on 4 December with the heats and the semifinals and 5 December with the final.

== Records ==
Prior to the competition, the existing world and championship records were as follows.

	Name	Nation	Time	Location	Date
World record	Lisbeth Trickett	Australia	51.01	Hobart	10 August 2009
Championship record	Ranomi Kromowidjojo	Netherlands	51.45	Dubai	17 December 2010

The following records were established during the competition:

Date	Event	Name	Nation	Time	Record
5 December	Final	Femke Heemskerk	Netherlands	51.37	CR

== Results ==
=== Heats ===
The heats were held at 09:38.

Rank	Heat	Lane	Name	Nationality	Time	Notes
1	10	4	Sarah Sjöström	Sweden	52.44	Q
1	12	4	Femke Heemskerk	Netherlands	52.44	Q
3	11	4	Ranomi Kromowidjojo	Netherlands	52.66	Q
4	12	5	Bronte Campbell	Australia	52.67	Q
5	10	5	Shannon Vreeland	United States	52.80	Q
6	11	5	Michelle Coleman	Sweden	52.81	Q
7	12	2	Erika Ferraioli	Italy	52.87	Q
8	11	3	Veronika Popova	Russia	53.01	Q
9	11	0	Abbey Weitzeil	United States	53.08	Q
10	12	6	Charlotte Bonnet	France	53.09	Q
11	10	3	Larissa Oliveira	Brazil	53.19	Q
12	10	2	Shen Duo	China	53.22	Q
13	11	6	Pernille Blume	Denmark	53.28	Q
14	12	3	Miki Uchida	Japan	53.35	Q
15	10	6	Arianna Vanderpool-Wallace	Bahamas	53.41	Q
16	10	7	Hanna-Maria Seppälä	Finland	53.57	Q
17	11	2	Julie Levisen	Denmark	53.83	
18	9	0	Nina Rangelova	Bulgaria	53.85	
19	10	8	Cecilie Johannessen	Norway	53.88	
20	11	1	Lena Kreundl	Austria	53.94	
21	12	0	Alessandra Marchioro	Brazil	54.00	
22	10	1	Nastja Govejšek	Slovenia	54.11	
23	11	7	Daniela Schreiber	Germany	54.12	
24	12	8	Susann Bjørnsen	Norway	54.25	
25	12	7	Birgit Koschischek	Austria	54.26	
26	8	3	Isabella Arcila	Colombia	54.31	
26	11	9	Giada Galizi	Italy	54.31	
28	9	3	Julie Meynen	Luxembourg	54.35	
29	11	8	Tomomi Aoki	Japan	54.38	
30	10	0	Anna Santamans	France	54.45	
31	9	5	Erin Gallagher	South Africa	54.51	
32	10	9	Anna Kolářová	Czech Republic	54.59	
33	9	1	Jessica Camposano	Colombia	54.63	
34	12	1	Margarita Nesterova	Russia	54.77	
34	12	9	Miroslava Najdanovski	Serbia	54.77	
36	9	8	Fanni Gyurinovics	Hungary	55.20	
37	8	0	Karen Torrez	Bolivia	55.48	
38	9	2	Chinyere Pigot	Suriname	55.55	
39	9	9	Zhang Jiaqi	China	55.58	
40	8	2	Ajna Késely	Hungary	55.75	
41	9	4	Trudi Maree	South Africa	55.81	
42	9	6	Ariel Weech	Bahamas	55.86	
43	9	7	İlknur Çakıcı	Turkey	56.10	
44	8	9	Esra Kaçmaz	Turkey	56.17	
45	8	6	Tess Grossmann	Estonia	56.41	
46	8	5	Yamilé Bahamonde	Ecuador	56.56	
47	8	7	Elisbet Gámez	Cuba	56.61	
48	8	4	Tracy Keith-Matchitt	Cook Islands	56.64	
49	7	4	Hannah Dato	Philippines	56.80	
50	4	5	Nguyễn Thị Ánh Viên	Vietnam	56.81	
51	6	1	Felicity Passon	Seychelles	56.85	
52	8	8	Julia Hassler	Liechtenstein	57.23	
53	4	4	Alexus Laird	Seychelles	57.32	
54	7	6	Olivia de Maroussem	Mauritius	57.41	
55	7	7	Jessica Cattaneo	Peru	57.43	
56	6	8	Sonja Adelaar	Namibia	57.58	
56	6	5	Aditi Dhumatkar	India	57.58	
58	5	7	Mónica Ramírez	Andorra	57.67	
59	6	4	Matelita Buadromo	Fiji	57.96	
60	7	0	Nikki Muscat	Malta	57.99	
61	6	3	Monika Vasilyan	Armenia	58.00	
62	7	2	Rebecca Maduro	Aruba	58.02	
63	8	1	Talita Baqlah	Jordan	58.31	
64	4	6	Kimiko Raheem	Sri Lanka	58.38	
65	7	3	Lei On Kei	Macau	58.47	
66	7	8	Sofía López	Paraguay	58.54	
67	7	1	Tan Chi Yan	Macau	58.56	
68	5	2	Beatrice Felici	San Marino	58.58	
69	5	0	Anna-Liza Mopio-Jane	Papua New Guinea	58.79	
70	6	6	Elena Giovannini	San Marino	58.84	
71	4	2	Nguyễn Diệu Linh	Vietnam	59.01	
72	6	0	Ana Nobrega	Angola	59.24	
73	4	8	Nadia Tudo	Andorra	59.25	
74	5	6	Emily Muteti	Kenya	59.28	
75	5	3	Elinah Phillip	British Virgin Islands	59.30	
76	5	5	Antonia Roth	Namibia	59.38	
77	6	7	Zabrina Holder	Barbados	59.43	
78	5	4	Maeform Borriello	Honduras	59.87	
78	6	2	Thalasha Prabhu	India	59.87	
80	4	0	Yara Lima	Angola	59.92	
81	5	8	Anna Manchekova	Azerbaijan	1:00.14	
82	4	9	Christina Linares	Gibraltar	1:00.41	
83	7	9	Rebeca Quinteros	El Salvador	1:00.51	
84	4	3	Tiara Anwar	Brunei	1:00.54	NR
85	6	9	Elisa Bernardi	San Marino	1:00.95	
86	3	4	Savannah Tkatchenko	Papua New Guinea	1:00.99	
87	4	1	Fabiola Espinoza	Nicaragua	1:01.01	
88	3	0	Jamaris Washshah	United States Virgin Islands	1:01.26	
89	5	9	Nikol Merizaj	Albania	1:01.35	
90	3	5	Debbie Chew	Guatemala	1:01.47	
91	3	3	Samantha Roberts	Antigua and Barbuda	1:01.85	
92	3	6	Amarah Phillip	British Virgin Islands	1:02.16	
93	2	1	Jennet Sariyeva	Turkmenistan	1:02.78	
94	2	3	San Khant Khant Su	Myanmar	1:02.85	
95	5	1	Estellah Fils	Madagascar	1:03.33	
96	3	8	Irene Prescott	Tonga	1:03.49	
97	3	1	Chamodi de Fonseka	Sri Lanka	1:03.51	
98	3	2	Annie Hepler	Marshall Islands	1:03.55	
99	2	4	Sofia Shah	Nepal	1:03.88	
100	2	0	Jamila Sanmoogan	Guyana	1:04.46	
101	2	8	Areeba Shaikh	Pakistan	1:04.74	
102	2	6	Tsogtgerel Mungunsor	Mongolia	1:05.89	
103	2	5	Sonia Tumiotto	Tanzania	1:05.81	
104	3	7	Diana Basho	Albania	1:05.96	
105	2	2	Aminath Shajan	Maldives	1:06.01	
106	1	5	Seabe Ebineng	Botswana	1:07.24	
107	2	7	Salie Alatrash	Palestine	1:07.30	
108	4	7	Chade Nersicio	Curaçao	1:07.39	
109	3	9	Angela Kendrick	Marshall Islands	1:08.85	
110	2	9	Karina Klimyk	Tajikistan	1:09.34	
111	1	4	Roylin Akiwo	Palau	1:11.05	
112	1	3	Elsie Uwamahoro	Burundi	1:13.64	
—	1	6	Christelle Moboutou	Republic of the Congo		DNS
—	7	5	Theodora Giareni	Greece		DNS

=== Semifinals ===
The semifinals were held at 18:06.

==== Semifinal 1 ====
Rank	Lane	Name	Nationality	Time	Notes
1	4	Femke Heemskerk	Netherlands	51.51	Q
2	5	Bronte Campbell	Australia	52.02	Q
3	3	Michelle Coleman	Sweden	52.26	Q
4	1	Miki Uchida	Japan	52.49	Q
5	6	Veronika Popova	Russia	52.56	Q
6	2	Charlotte Bonnet	France	52.77	
7	7	Shen Duo	China	52.82	
8	8	Hanna-Maria Seppälä	Finland	53.49	

==== Semifinal 2 ====
Rank	Lane	Name	Nationality	Time	Notes
1	4	Sarah Sjöström	Sweden	51.46	Q
2	5	Ranomi Kromowidjojo	Netherlands	51.57	Q
3	8	Arianna Vanderpool-Wallace	Bahamas	52.56	Q
4	3	Shannon Vreeland	United States	52.69	
5	7	Larissa Oliveira	Brazil	52.75	SA
6	6	Erika Ferraioli	Italy	52.87	
7	1	Pernille Blume	Denmark	52.90	
8	2	Abbey Weitzeil	United States	53.14	

=== Final ===
The final was held at 18:12.

Rank	Lane	Name	Nationality	Time	Notes
1st place, gold medalist(s)	5	Femke Heemskerk	Netherlands	51.37	CR
2nd place, silver medalist(s)	4	Sarah Sjöström	Sweden	51.39	
3rd place, bronze medalist(s)	3	Ranomi Kromowidjojo	Netherlands	51.47	
4	6	Bronte Campbell	Australia	51.65	
5	2	Michelle Coleman	Sweden	51.92	
6	8	Arianna Vanderpool-Wallace	Bahamas	52.34	
7	7	Miki Uchida	Japan	52.35	
8	1	Veronika Popova	Russia	52.45	
