= Dirngulbai Misech =

Palauan swimmer

Personal information
- Born: September 27, 1997 (age 27); Koror, Palau
- Height: 1.65 m (5 ft 5 in)
- Weight: 124 lb (56 kg)

Sport
- Country: Palau
- Sport: Swimming
- Event(s): 50m freestyle, 50 butterfly, 100 butterfly, 200 butterfly

Dirngulbai Moreyna "UB" Misech (born 27 September 1997) is a female Palauan swimmer and represents her country at international swimming competitions. She holds seven national records.

She competed in the 50 m freestyle, 100 m freestyle and 50 m butterfly events at the 2012 FINA World Swimming Championships (25 m). Misech also competed in the 50 m and 100 m freestyle events at the 2013 World Aquatics Championships. Most recently she competed at the 2014 FINA World Swimming Championships (25 m), 2014 Summer Youth Olympics and 2015 World Aquatics Championships.

== National records ==
In 2015, she broke the Palauan record (her own) for the 100m butterfly during the 2015 Pacific Games and had broken a number of national records (400 meter freestyle, 100 meter butterfly, 1500 meter freestyle and 400 meter individual medley) at the Saipan International Meet. As of April 2016 she owns 21 Palauan records.

=== Long course (50 m) ===
==== Women's records ====
Event	Time		Name	Club	Date	Meet	Location	Ref
50m freestyle	29.64	h	Dirngulbai Misech	Palau	11 July 2015	Pacific Games	Port Moresby, Papua New Guinea	
200m freestyle	2:26.87		Dirngulbai Misech	Palau	7 July 2015	Pacific Games	Port Moresby, Papua New Guinea	
400m freestyle	5:21.05		Dirngulbai Misech	Palau	12 March 2015	SSC International Meet	Saipan, Northern Mariana Islands	
1500m freestyle	21:11.56		Dirngulbai Misech	Palau	12 March 2015	SSC International Meet	Saipan, Northern Mariana Islands	
50m butterfly	31.70	h	Dirngulbai Misech	Palau	7 August 2015	World Championships	Kazan, Russia	
100m butterfly	1:14.05	h	Dirngulbai Misech	Palau	2 August 2015	World Championships	Kazan, Russia	
200m butterfly	3:03.28		Dirngulbai Misech	Palau	11 July 2015	Pacific Games	Port Moresby, Papua New Guinea	
400m individual medley	6:19.94		Dirngulbai Misech	Palau	6 July 2015	Pacific Games	Port Moresby, Papua New Guinea	
4×50m freestyle relay	2:05.72		Roylin Akiwo; Romellen Maidoo; Rhema Joy Maido; Dirngulbai Misech	Palau	14 March 2015	SSC International Meet	Saipan, Northern Mariana Islands	
4×100m freestyle relay	4:46.43		Roylin Akiwo; Romellen Maidoo; Rhema Joy Maido; Dirngulbai Misech	Palau	12 March 2015	SSC International Meet	Saipan, Northern Mariana Islands	
4×50m medley relay	2:25.21		Roylin Akiwo; Romellen Maidoo; Dirngulbai Misech; Berneace Balayo	Palau	13 March 2015	SSC International Meet	Saipan, Northern Mariana Islands	
4×100m medley relay	5:25.83		Roylin Akiwo; Romellen Maidoo; Dirngulbai Misech; Rhema Joy Maido	Palau	12 March 2015	SSC International Meet	Saipan, Northern Mariana Islands	

Legend: # – Record awaiting ratification by Palau Swimming Association; WR – World record; OC – Oceanian record;
Records not set in finals: h – heat; sf – semifinal; r – relay 1st leg; rh – relay heat 1st leg; b – B final; † – en route to final mark; tt – time trial

==== Mixed relay ====
Event	Time	Name	Club	Date	Meet	Location	Ref
4×50m mixed freestyle relay	1:55.48	Roylin Akiwo (29.76); Dirngulbai Misech (29.23); Noel Keane (29.11); Shawn Wallace (27.38)	Palau	9 July 2015	Pacific Games	Port Moresby, Papua New Guinea	
4×50m mixed medley relay	2:13.32	Roylin Akiwo (34.81); Noel Keane; Dirngulbai Misech; Shawn Wallace	Palau	8 July 2015	Pacific Games	Port Moresby, Papua New Guinea	

Legend: # – Record awaiting ratification by Palau Swimming Association; WR – World record; OC – Oceanian record;
Records not set in finals: h – heat

=== Short course (25 m) ===
Event	Time		Name	Club	Date	Meet	Location	Ref
50m freestyle	29.49	h	Dirngulbai Misech	Palau	6 December 2014	World Championships	Doha, Qatar	
100m freestyle	1:07.24	h	Dirngulbai Misech	Palau	13 December 2012	World Championships	Istanbul, Turkey	
200m freestyle	2:27.72	h	Dirngulbai Misech	Palau	7 December 2014	World Championships	Doha, Qatar	
50m butterfly	32.42	h	Dirngulbai Misech	Palau	4 December 2014	World Championships	Doha, Qatar	
100m butterfly	1:14.46	h	Dirngulbai Misech	Palau	6 December 2014	World Championships	Doha, Qatar	
200m butterfly	3:03.34	h	Dirngulbai Misech	Palau	3 December 2014	World Championships	Doha, Qatar	

Legend: # – Record awaiting ratification by Palau Swimming Association; WR – World record; OC – Oceanian record;
Records not set in finals: h – heat; sf – semifinal; r – relay 1st leg; rh – relay heat 1st leg; b – B final; † – en route to final mark; tt – time trial
