= 2014 FINA World Swimming Championships (25 m) – Women's 50 metre freestyle =

Women's 50m Freestyle at the 2014 FINA World Swimming Championships (25 m)
- Dates: 6 December (heats and semifinals); 7 December (final)
- Competitors: 122 from 88 nations
- Winning time: 23.32

Medalists
gold medal	Ranomi Kromowidjojo	Netherlands
silver medal	Bronte Campbell	Australia
bronze medal	Dorothea Brandt	Germany

The Women's 50m Freestyle competition of the 2014 FINA World Swimming Championships (25 m) was held on 6 December with the heats and the semifinals and 7 December with the final.

== Records ==
Prior to the competition, the existing world and championship records were as follows.

	Name	Nation	Time	Location	Date
World record	Ranomi Kromowidjojo	Netherlands	23.24	Eindhoven	7 August 2013
Championship record	Marleen Veldhuis	Netherlands	23.25	Manchester	13 April 2008

== Results ==
=== Heats ===
The heats were held at 10:37.

Rank	Heat	Lane	Name	Nationality	Time	Notes
1	11	4	Bronte Campbell	Australia	23.81	Q
1	13	4	Ranomi Kromowidjojo	Netherlands	23.81	Q
3	11	7	Madison Kennedy	United States	24.07	Q
4	11	5	Dorothea Brandt	Germany	24.08	Q
5	12	4	Arianna Vanderpool-Wallace	Bahamas	24.11	Q
6	12	6	Erika Ferraioli	Italy	24.12	Q
7	13	5	Inge Dekker	Netherlands	24.24	Q
8	13	1	Abbey Weitzeil	United States	24.27	Q
9	13	6	Anna Santamans	France	24.29	Q
10	11	3	Miki Uchida	Japan	24.35	Q
11	11	6	Pernille Blume	Denmark	24.40	Q
12	13	3	Rozaliya Nasretdinova	Russia	24.52	Q
13	12	3	Etiene Medeiros	Brazil	24.56	Q
14	12	7	Hanna-Maria Seppälä	Finland	24.57	Q
15	12	2	Silvia Di Pietro	Italy	24.61	Q
16	13	2	Larissa Oliveira	Brazil	24.67	Q
17	9	1	Zsuzsanna Jakabos	Hungary	24.79	
18	11	2	Liu Xiang	China	24.87	
19	10	5	Isabella Arcila	Colombia	24.88	
20	13	7	Birgit Koschischek	Austria	24.93	
21	9	5	Nina Rangelova	Bulgaria	24.93	
22	12	8	Sviatlana Khakhlova	Belarus	24.96	
23	11	0	Susann Bjørnsen	Norway	24.99	
24	13	0	Anna Kolářová	Czech Republic	25.06	
25	11	1	Tang Yi	China	25.07	
25	13	9	Cecilie Johannessen	Norway	25.07	
27	12	0	Mélanie Henique	France	25.10	
28	10	1	Chinyere Pigot	Suriname	25.11	
29	12	1	Julie Levisen	Denmark	25.12	
30	9	2	Karen Torrez	Bolivia	25.13	
31	12	9	Nastja Govejšek	Slovenia	25.20	
32	13	8	Julie Meynen	Luxembourg	25.37	
33	10	0	Trudi Maree	South Africa	25.40	
34	10	7	Miroslava Najdanovski	Serbia	25.41	
35	10	4	Lehesta Kemp	South Africa	25.43	
36	10	8	Margarita Nesterova	Russia	25.49	
37	9	0	Theodora Giareni	Greece	25.50	
38	9	3	Jenjira Srisa-Ard	Thailand	25.63	
39	9	4	Carolina Colorado Henao	Colombia	25.66	
40	10	9	Tess Grossmann	Estonia	25.69	
41	8	8	Fanni Gyurinovics	Hungary	25.70	
42	11	8	İlknur Çakıcı	Turkey	25.85	
43	11	9	Brianna Throssell	Australia	25.91	
44	8	7	Esra Kaçmaz	Turkey	25.97	
45	4	2	Felicity Passon	Seychelles	26.00	
46	9	6	Yamile Bahamonde	Ecuador	26.03	
47	8	4	Elisbet Gámez	Cuba	26.06	
48	8	9	Machiko Raheem	Sri Lanka	26.13	
49	9	7	Talita Baqlah	Jordan	26.14	
50	4	1	Alexus Laird	Seychelles	26.23	
50	9	9	Tracy Keith-Matchitt	Cook Islands	26.23	
52	7	2	Hannah Miley	Great Britain	26.30	
53	9	8	Nikki Muscat	Malta	26.34	
54	8	2	Olivia de Maroussem	Mauritius	26.39	
55	7	6	Aditi Dhumatkar	India	26.55	
56	8	0	Monika Vasilyan	Armenia	26.57	
57	8	1	Beatrice Felici	San Marino	26.59	
58	8	5	Rebecca Maduro	Aruba	26.64	
59	7	5	Elinah Phillip	British Virgin Islands	26.74	
60	6	7	Anna-Liza Mopio-Jane	Papua New Guinea	26.76	
61	6	5	Maria Ribera	Bolivia	26.93	
62	6	9	Monica Ramírez	Andorra	26.96	
63	7	4	Anna Manchenkova	Azerbaijan	26.98	
64	5	5	Oreoluwa Cherebin	Grenada	27.05	
65	6	0	Lauren Hew	Cayman Islands	27.19	
66	7	0	Ana Nobrega	Angola	27.21	
67	6	4	Zabrina Holder	Barbados	27.27	
67	7	3	Thalasha Prabhu	India	27.27	
69	7	1	Kimiko Raheem	Sri Lanka	27.32	
70	6	3	Long Chi Wai	Macau	27.34	
71	7	8	Joyce Tafatatha	Malawi	27.37	
72	8	6	Chade Nersicio	Curaçao	27.38	
73	7	9	Emily Muteti	Kenya	27.43	
74	3	4	Jamaris Washshah	United States Virgin Islands	27.46	
75	6	6	Fabiola Espinoza	Nicaragua	27.47	
76	4	7	Tiara Anwar	Brunei	27.54	NR
77	5	8	Nadia Tudo	Andorra	27.63	
78	6	8	Samantha Roberts	Antigua and Barbuda	27.666	
79	4	0	Nguyễn Diệu Linh	Vietnam	27.67	
80	6	2	Maeform Borriello	Honduras	27.69	
81	5	2	Nikol Merizaj	Albania	27.87	
82	7	7	Choi Weng Tong	Macau	27.88	
83	4	5	Annie Hepler	Marshall Islands	28.04	
84	8	3	Rebeca Quinteros	El Salvador	28.05	
85	5	3	Talisa Lanoe	Kenya	28.07	
86	5	1	San Su Moe Theint	Myanmar	28.10	
87	4	4	Savannah Tkatchenko	Papua New Guinea	28.17	
87	5	7	Christina Linares	Gibraltar	28.17	
89	4	6	Evelina Afoa	Samoa	28.22	
90	5	6	Yara Lima	Angola	28.28	
91	5	9	Saryyeva Prescott	Tonga	28.35	
92	4	9	Merjen Saryyeva	Turkmenistan	28.56	
93	5	4	Ophelia Swayne	Ghana	28.60	
94	4	3	Amarah Phillip	British Virgin Islands	28.62	
95	3	3	Jamila Sanmoogan	Guyana	28.65	
96	3	6	Jennet Saryyeva	Turkmenistan	28.89	
97	3	5	Areeba Shaikh	Pakistan	29.02	
98	6	1	Estellah Fils	Madagascar	29.06	
99	2	5	Deandra van der Colff	Botswana	29.40	
100	2	6	Dirngulbai Misech	Palau	29.49	
101	3	7	Sofia Shah	Nepal	29.75	
102	2	2	Tsogtgerel Mungunsor	Mongolia	29.79	
103	2	8	Seabe Ebineng	Botswana	30.01	
104	4	8	Catherine Mason	Tanzania	30.20	
105	3	8	Angela Kendrick	Marshall Islands	30.23	
106	1	5	Angelika Ouedraogo	Burkina Faso	30.54	
107	2	3	Aminath Shajan	Maldives	30.56	
108	5	0	Nada Arkaji	Qatar	30.59	
109	3	9	Fatou Diagne	Senegal	30.60	
110	3	0	Diana Basho	Albania	30.66	
111	3	2	Sonia Tumiotto	Tanzania	30.78	
112	1	4	Karina Klimyk	Tajikistan	30.91	
113	2	1	Roylin Akiwo	Palau	30.94	
114	3	1	Adora Lawrence	Saint Vincent and the Grenadines	31.04	
115	2	7	Hem Thon Vitiny	Cambodia	31.32	
116	1	6	Mayra-Linda Paul	Federated States of Micronesia	32.16	
117	1	3	Elsie Uwamahoro	Burundi	33.55	
118	1	7	Nazlati Mohamed	Comoros	35.63	
119	1	8	Joyce Rudaseswa	Rwanda	37.98	
120	1	1	Ramata Coulibaly	Mali	40.14	
—	1	2	Christelle Moboutou	Republic of the Congo		DNS
—	2	0	Kokoe Ahyee	Ivory Coast		DNS
—	2	4	Shamira Zoumande	Central African Republic		DNS
—	10	2	Ariel Weech	Bahamas		DNS
—	10	6	Rūta Meilutytė	Lithuania		DNS
—	12	5	Fran Halsall	Great Britain		DNS
—	2	9	Salie Al-Atrash	Palestine		DSQ
—	10	3	Yayoi Matsumoto	Japan		DSQ

=== Semifinals ===
The semifinals were held at 18:44.

==== Semifinal 1 ====
Rank	Lane	Name	Nationality	Time	Notes
1	4	Ranomi Kromowidjojo	Netherlands	23.43	Q
2	5	Dorothea Brandt	Germany	24.03	Q
3	3	Erika Ferraioli	Italy	24.10	Q
4	7	Rozaliya Nasretdinova	Russia	24.12	Q
5	6	Abbey Weitzeil	United States	24.23	
6	2	Miki Uchida	Japan	24.24	
7	1	Silvia Di Pietro	Italy	24.37	
8	8	Zsuzsanna Jakabos	Hungary	25.02	

==== Semifinal 2 ====
Rank	Lane	Name	Nationality	Time	Notes
1	5	Madison Kennedy	United States	23.96	Q
2	4	Bronte Campbell	Australia	24.01	Q
3	6	Inge Dekker	Netherlands	24.08	Q
4	3	Arianna Vanderpool-Wallace	Bahamas	24.13	Q
5	2	Anna Santamans	France	24.22	
6	7	Pernille Blume	Denmark	24.35	
7	8	Larissa Oliveira	Brazil	24.70	
8	1	Hanna-Maria Seppälä	Finland	24.78	

=== Final ===
The final was held at 19:13.

Rank	Lane	Name	Nationality	Time	Notes
1st place, gold medalist(s)	4	Ranomi Kromowidjojo	Netherlands	23.32	
2nd place, silver medalist(s)	6	Bronte Campbell	Australia	23.62	
3rd place, bronze medalist(s)	5	Dorothea Brandt	Germany	23.77	
4	2	Madison Kennedy	United States	23.86	
5	1	Arianna Vanderpool-Wallace	Bahamas	23.93	
6	3	Inge Dekker	Netherlands	24.02	
7	8	Erika Ferraioli	Italy	24.09	
8	7	Rozaliya Nasretdinova	Russia	24.19	
