= Swimming at the 2025 Pacific Mini Games =

- Venue: Palau National Swimming Pool
- Location: Meyuns, Koror, Palau
- Dates: 30 June – 5 July, 2025

Swimming at the 2025 Pacific Mini Games in Palau was held on 30 June – 5 July, 2025 at the Palau National Swimming Pool in Meyuns, with the open water swimming being held near the Japan-Palau Friendship Bridge.

== Medal summary ==
=== Medal table ===
* Host nation (Palau)

Rank	Nation	Gold	Silver	Bronze	Total
1	Tahiti	22	22	6	50
2	Fiji	7	10	4	21
3	Samoa	6	4	10	20
4	Northern Mariana Islands	6	4	4	14
5	Cook Islands	3	3	5	11
6	New Caledonia	3	2	13	18
7	Guam	0	1	2	3
8	Papua New Guinea	0	1	1	2
9	Palau*	0	0	3	3
Totals (9 entries)		47	47	48	142

=== Men's ===
Event	Gold		Silver		Bronze	
50 m freestyle	David Young; Fiji	22.12	Hansel McCaig; Fiji	22.63	Hector Langkilde; Samoa	22.79
100 m freestyle	Hansel McCaig; Fiji	50.34	Hector Langkilde; Samoa	50.78	Keha Desbordes; Tahiti	50.79
100 m freestyle	Hansel McCaig; Fiji	50.34	Hector Langkilde; Samoa	50.78	Manea Teriierooiterai; Tahiti	50.79
200 m freestyle	Nael Roux; Tahiti	1:54.06	Enoa Vial; Tahiti	1:55.69	Israel Poppe; Guam	1:56.69
400 m freestyle	Nael Roux; Tahiti	4:01.24	Enoa Vial; Tahiti	4:05.00	Luke Mercier; New Caledonia	4:07.46
800 m freestyle	Enoa Vial; Tahiti	8:22.80	Nael Roux; Tahiti	8:58.20	Kean Pajarillaga; Northern Mariana Islands	8:59.35
1500 m freestyle	Nael Roux; Tahiti	16:07.50	Enoa Vial; Tahiti	16:27.42	Luke Mercier; New Caledonia	16:47.22
50 m backstroke	Isaiah Aleksenko; Northern Mariana Islands	24.47	Keha Desbordes; Tahiti	25.30	Hansel McCaig; Fiji	25.68 NR
100 m backstroke	Isaiah Aleksenko; Northern Mariana Islands	52.55 NR	Keha Desbordes; Tahiti	54.84	Kazuumi Nestor; Palau	56.88
200 m backstroke	Solomona Hamilton; Samoa	2:05.36	Kean Pajarillaga; Northern Mariana Islands	2:07.29	Sosthene Videau; Tahiti	2:08.17
50 m breaststroke	Samuel Yalimaiwai; Fiji	27.74 NR	David Young; Fiji	28.63	Jacob Story; Cook Islands	29.09
100 m breaststroke	Samuel Yalimaiwai; Fiji	1:01.47	Nael Roux; Tahiti	1:01.67	Don Younger; Fiji	1:04.19
200 m breaststroke	Jacob Story; Cook Islands	2:13.71 NR	Sosthene Videau; Tahiti	2:19.28	Yaron Nodanche; New Caledonia	2:20.78
50 m butterfly	Isaiah Aleksenko; Northern Mariana Islands	23.78	David Young; Fiji	24.33	Hansel McCaig; Fiji	24.34
100 m butterfly	Isaiah Aleksenko; Northern Mariana Islands	52.27	Nicolas Vermorel; Tahiti	53.72	Hansel McCaig; Fiji	54.95 NR
200 m butterfly	Isaiah Aleksenko; Northern Mariana Islands	1:58.52 NR	Nael Roux; Tahiti	2:07.18	Kazuumi Nestor; Palau	2:12.07
100 m individual medley	Isaiah Aleksenko; Northern Mariana Islands	55.25 NR	Jacob Story; Cook Islands	56.08 NR	Nael Roux; Tahiti	57.22
200 m individual medley	Jacob Story; Cook Islands	2:04.08 NR	Nael Roux; Tahiti	2:05.14	Luke Mercier; New Caledonia	2:08.81
400 m individual medley	Nael Roux; Tahiti	4:25.15	Jacob Story; Cook Islands	4:27.01 NR	Sosthene Videau; Tahiti	4:40.18
4 × 100 m freestyle relay	Tahiti; Keha Desbordes; Nael Roux; Manea Teriierooiterai; Sosthene Videau	3:26.17	Fiji; Hansel McCaig; Livai Raviko; Reuben Taylor; David Young	3:26.73 NR	Northern Mariana Islands; Isaiah Aleksenko; Justin Yao Ma; Michael Kiyotaka Hagiwara Miller; Kean Pajarillaga	3:31.56 NR
4 × 200 m freestyle relay	Tahiti; Keha Desbordes; Nael Roux; Manea Teriierooiterai; Enoa Vial	7:42.83	Northern Mariana Islands; Isaiah Aleksenko; Justin Yao Ma; Kean Pajarillaga; Moshe Vien Sikkel	7:53.76 NR	Palau; Charlie Gibbons; Noel Keane; Kazuumi Nestor; Travis Sakurai	7:57.33
4 × 100 m medley relay	Tahiti; Keha Desbordes; Nael Roux; Manea Teriierooiterai; Nicolas Vermorel	3:41.64	Fiji; Thaddeus Kwong; Hansel McCaig; Samuel Yalimaiwai; David Young	3:44.06 NR	Northern Mariana Islands; Isaiah Aleksenko; Kean Pajarillaga; Moshe Vien Sikkel; Kouki Cerezo Watanabe	3:48.83 NR
5 km open water	Nael Roux; Tahiti	59:52.20	Enoa Vial; Tahiti	59:56.10	Luke Mercier; New Caledonia	59:56.40

=== Women's ===
Event	Gold		Silver		Bronze	
50 m freestyle	Paige Schendelaar-Kemp; Samoa	26.59	Heimaru-Iti Bonnard; Tahiti	26.94	Mia Lee; Guam	26.95
100 m freestyle	Paige Schendelaar-Kemp; Samoa	57.84	Heimaru-Iti Bonnard; Tahiti	58.24	Jhnayali Tokome-Garap; Papua New Guinea	58.95
200 m freestyle	Heimaru-Iti Bonnard; Tahiti	2:06.47	Paige Schendelaar-Kemp; Samoa	2:07.16	Camille Jarcet; New Caledonia	2:09.64
400 m freestyle	Deotille Videau; Tahiti		Lili Paillisse; Tahiti		Camille Jarcet; New Caledonia	
800 m freestyle	Lili Paillisse; Tahiti	9:18.61	Marseleima Moss; Fiji	9:43.53	Camille Jarcet; New Caledonia	9:44.14
1500 m freestyle	Lili Paillisse; Tahiti	17:45.91	Marseleima Moss; Fiji	18:42.74	Talia Saumamao; Samoa	18:45.23
50 m backstroke	Deotille Videau; Tahiti	29.67	Jhnayali Tokome-Garap; Papua New Guinea	29.88	Mia Laban; Cook Islands	30.07 NR
100 m backstroke	Mia Laban; Cook Islands	1:04.14 NR	Deotille Videau; Tahiti	1:04.18	Salani Sa'aga; Samoa	1:04.46
200 m backstroke	Nafanua Hamilton; Samoa	2:18.29	Deotille Videau; Tahiti	2:18.51	Mia Laban; Cook Islands	2:18.94 NR
50 m breaststroke	Kelera Mudunasoko; Fiji	32.62	Maria Batallones; Northern Mariana Islands	33.40	Manon Baldovini; New Caledonia	34.82
100 m breaststroke	Kelera Mudunasoko; Fiji	1:12.01	Maria Batallones; Northern Mariana Islands	1:14.03	Manon Baldovini; New Caledonia	1:14.35
200 m breaststroke	Manon Baldovini; New Caledonia	2:36.51	Kelera Mudunasoko; Fiji	2:41.46	Maria Batallones; Northern Mariana Islands	2:43.78
50 m butterfly	Paige Schendelaar-Kemp; Samoa		Deotille Videau; Tahiti		Heimaru-Iti Bonnard; Tahiti	
100 m butterfly	Paige Schendelaar-Kemp; Samoa	1:01.16	Deotille Videau; Tahiti	1:01.88	Mia Laban; Cook Islands	1:03.51 NR
200 m butterfly	Deotille Videau; Tahiti	2:20.83	Amaya Bollinger; Guam	2:24.77	Alicia Story; Cook Islands	2:29.27 NR
100 m individual medley	Deotille Videau; Tahiti	1:05.80	Mia Laban; Cook Islands	1:06.88	Clara Delunel; New Caledonia	1:07.67
200 m individual medley	Deotille Videau; Tahiti	2:22.67	Nafanua Hamilton; Samoa	2:26.03	Clara Delunel; New Caledonia	2:26.17
400 m individual medley	Deotille Videau; Tahiti	5:08.41	Clara Delunel; New Caledonia	5:21.90	Salani Sa'aga; Samoa	5:23.39
4 × 100 m freestyle relay	New Caledonia; Lusia-Laa Ah Scha; Manon Baldovini; Clara Delunel; Camille Jarcet	3:57.68	Tahiti; Heimaru-Iti Bonnard; Hawaiki Moro; Lili Paillisse; Deotille Videau	4:00.71	Samoa; Nafanua Hamilton; Salani Sa'aga; Talia Saumamao; Paige Schendelaar-Kemp	4:01.31
4 × 200 m freestyle relay	Tahiti; Heimaru-Iti Bonnard; Hawaiki Moro; Lili Paillisse; Deotille Videau	8:43.42	Samoa; Nafanua Hamilton; Salani Sa'aga; Talia Saumamao; Paige Schendelaar-Kemp	8:51.05	New Caledonia; Lusia-Laa Ah Scha; Manon Baldovini; Clara Delunel; Camille Jarcet	8:53.33
4 × 100 m medley relay	New Caledonia; Lusia-Laa Ah Scha; Manon Baldovini; Diane Bui-Duyet; Clara Delunel	4:22.18	Fiji; Vivita Bai; Theola Kwong; Marseleima Moss; Kelera Mudunasoko	4:27.37 NR	Samoa; Nafanua Hamilton; Salani Sa'aga; Talia Saumamao; Paige Schendelaar-Kemp	4:27.95
5 km open water	Lili Paillisse; Tahiti	1:00:46.20	Deotille Videau; Tahiti	1:04:00.60	Talia Saumamao; Samoa	1:08:06.00

=== Mixed ===
Event	Gold		Silver		Bronze	
4 × 50 m freestyle relay	Fiji; Vivita Bai; Hansel McCaig; Jonalese Vatubua; David Young	1:39.20 NR	Tahiti; Heimaru-Iti Bonnard; Keha Desbordes; Manea Teriierooiterai; Deotille Videau	1:39.35	Samoa; Nafanua Hamilton; Hector Langkilde; Paige Schendelaar-Kemp; Johann Stickland	1:39.38
4 × 50 m medley relay	Tahiti; Heimaru-Iti Bonnard; Toki Temaiana; Deotille Videau; Sosthene Videau	1:47.48	Fiji; Hansel McCaig; Charlina Simpson; Imelda Smith; David Young	1:49.68 NR	Samoa; Nafanua Hamilton; Hector Langkilde; Paige Schendelaar-Kemp; Johann Stickland	1:49.92
4 × 1.25 km open water relay	Tahiti; Lili Paillisse; Nael Roux; Enoa Vial; Deotille Videau	48:25.70	New Caledonia; Clara Delunel; Camille Jarcet; Luke Mercier; Yaron Nodanche	50:49.40	Samoa; Hector Langkilde; Talia Saumamao; Paige Schendelaar-Kemp; Brandon Schuster	54:51.40

== See also ==
- Swimming at the Pacific Games
- Swimming at the 2023 Pacific Games
