= Paige Flynn =

New Zealand swimmer

Personal information
- Nationality: New Zealand
- Born: 20 November 1996 (age 29)

Sport
- Sport: Swimming
Medal record
Women's swimming
Representing New Zealand
Oceania Championships
Gold medal – first place	2018 Port Moresby	50 m backstroke
Gold medal – first place	2018 Port Moresby	100 m backstroke
Silver medal – second place	2018 Port Moresby	100 m freestyle
Bronze medal – third place	2018 Port Moresby	50 m freestyle

Paige Flynn (born 20 November 1996) is a New Zealand swimmer. She competed in the women's 100 metre freestyle event at the 2018 FINA World Swimming Championships (25 m), in Hangzhou, China.
