= Olivia Borg =

Samoan swimmer

Personal information
- Born: 19 January 2001
- Height: 160 cm (5 ft 3 in)

Sport
- Country: Samoa
- Sport: Swimming
Medal record
Women's swimming
Representing Samoa
Pacific Games
Gold medal – first place	2023 Honiara	50m freestyle
Gold medal – first place	2023 Honiara	100m freestyle
Gold medal – first place	2023 Honiara	50m butterfly
Gold medal – first place	2023 Honiara	100m butterfly
Silver medal – second place	2023 Honiara	200m butterfly
Bronze medal – third place	2023 Honiara	200m freestyle

Olivia Borg (born 19 January 2001) is a Samoan swimmer who has represented Samoa at the Commonwealth Games and Pacific Games.

Borg has been swimming since she was eight years old.

Borg competed at the 2022 Commonwealth Games in Birmingham, England, where she became the first Samoan swimmer to compete in a Commonwealth Games final.

At the 2023 Pacific Games in Honiara she won gold in the 50 and 100 meters freestyle and 50 and 100 meters butterfly, silver in the 200 meters butterfly, and bronze in the 200 meters freestyle.
