= Wesley Roberts (swimmer) =

Cook Islands swimmer (born 1997)

Personal information
- Full name: Wesley Tikiariki Roberts
- Born: 24 June 1997 (age 29)
- Height: 1.90 m (6 ft 3 in)
- Weight: 74 kg (163 lb)

Sport
- Country: Cook Islands
- Sport: Swimming
- Strokes: Freestyle
- Club: Wests Illawarra Aquatic
Medal record
Men's swimming
Representing Cook Islands
Pacific Games
Gold medal – first place	2023 Honiara	100 m freestyle
Gold medal – first place	2023 Honiara	400 m freestyle
Gold medal – first place	2019 Apia	200 m freestyle
Silver medal – second place	2023 Honiara	50 m butterfly
Silver medal – second place	2019 Apia	400 m freestyle
Silver medal – second place	2019 Apia	1500 m freestyle
Bronze medal – third place	2019 Apia	100 m freestyle
Bronze medal – third place	2023 Honiara	200 m medley
Oceania Championships
Gold medal – first place	2018 Port Moresby	400 m freestyle
Silver medal – second place	2018 Port Moresby	200 m freestyle
Bronze medal – third place	2018 Port Moresby	1500 m freestyle

Wesley Roberts (born 24 June 1997) is a Cook Islands swimmer who competed at the 2016 Summer Olympics and holds several Cook Islands national records in swimming.

== Personal life ==
Roberts is from Atiu, and was educated at the University of Wollongong in Australia.

== Swimming career ==
Roberts won the gold medal in the men's 1500 and 400 metres long course freestyle event at the 2016 Oceania Swimming Championships. Roberts also won gold, 2 silver and a bronze in the 200 Freestyle, 400 Freestyle, 1500 Freestyle and the 100 Freestyle respectively at the 2019 Pacific Games, held in Apia, Samoa.

Roberts represented the Cook Islands at the 2016 Summer Olympics, where he swam in the men's 1500 metre freestyle.

At the 2023 Pacific Games in Honiara he won gold medals in the 100 and 400 meters freestyle, silver in the 50 meters butterfly, and bronze in the 200 meters medley.
