= Tracy Keith-Matchitt =

New Zealand-Cook Island swimmer

Personal information
- Born: 30 March 1990 (age 36) Wodonga Australia
- Height: 1.67 m (5 ft 5 1/2 in)
- Weight: 60 kg (130 lb)

Sport
- Country: Cook Islands
- Sport: Swimming
- Event: 100 metre freestyle

Tracy Keith-Matchitt (born 30 March 1990) is a New Zealand-Cook Islands swimmer who competed at the 2016 Summer Olympics and holds many of the Cook Islands national records in swimming.

== Swimming career ==
Based in Tokoroa, New Zealand, Keith-Matchitt attended the 2014 FINA World Swimming Championships (25 m), and competed in the 50 metre and 100 metre freestyle events.

She again competed in the 50 metre and 100 metre freestyle events at the 2015 World Aquatics Championships.

She qualified for the Cook Islands at the 2016 Summer Olympics, where she competed in the women's 100 metre freestyle and ranked at #38 with a time of 58.90 seconds. Keith-Matchitt did not advance to the semifinals.
