= Oliver Nash =

American politician

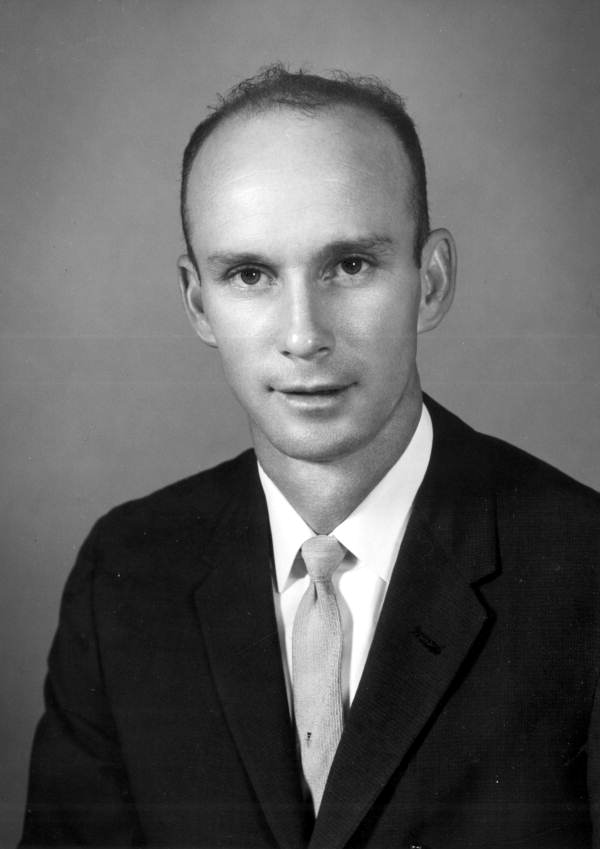

Member of the Florida House of Representatives from the Franklin County district
- In office 1959–1964

Personal details
- Born: February 26, 1931 Apalachicola, Florida, U.S.
- Died: May 27, 2013 (aged 82) Apalachicola, Florida, U.S.
- Party: Democratic
- Occupation: paper tester

Oliver Nash (February 26, 1931 – May 27, 2013) was a politician in the American state of Florida. He served in the Florida House of Representatives from 1959 to 1964, representing Franklin County.
