= 2018 Oceania Swimming Championships =

- Host city: Port Moresby, Papua New Guinea
- Date(s): 25–30 June
- Venue(s): Taurama Aquatic Centre
- Events: 46

The 2018 Oceania Swimming Championships was held from 25 to 30 June 2018 at the Taurama Aquatic Centre in Port Moresby, Papua New Guinea. It was the twelfth edition of the biennial championships as well as the first to be held in Port Moresby. The tournament featured competition in swimming and open water swimming.

== Participating nations ==
A total of sixteen teams have confirmed participation for the 2018 Oceania Swimming Championships:

- American Samoa (1)
- Australia (16)
- Cook Islands
- Federated States of Micronesia
- Fiji (22)
- Guam (5)
- Hawaii (8)
- Marshall Islands
- New Zealand (20)
- Northern Mariana Islands (7)
- Palau
- Papua New Guinea (24)
- Samoa (11)
- Solomon Islands
- Tonga
- Vanuatu (4)

== Medal table ==
* Host nation (Papua New Guinea)

Rank	Nation	Gold	Silver	Bronze	Total
1	New Zealand	21	16	13	50
2	Australia	19	20	9	48
3	Hawaii	5	4	14	23
4	Fiji	1	2	6	9
5	Cook Islands	1	1	1	3
6	Samoa	0	3	1	4
7	Papua New Guinea*	0	0	1	1
Totals (7 entries)		47	46	45	138

== Event summary ==
=== Men's events ===
Event	Gold		Silver		Bronze	
50m freestyle	Daniel Caldwell; New Zealand	23.23	Carter Swift; New Zealand	23.26	Samuel Seghers; Papua New Guinea	23.90
100m freestyle	Carter Swift; New Zealand	50.84	Michael Petrides; Hawaii	51.31	Oliver Nash; Australia	51.50
200m freestyle	Michael Petrides; Hawaii	1:51.14	Wesley Roberts; Cook Islands	1:51.21	Aaron Mansfield; Australia	1:53.13
400m freestyle	Wesley Roberts; Cook Islands	3:56.01	Ethan Owens; Australia	3:57.41	Michael Petrides; Hawaii	4:01.11
1500m freestyle	Ethan Owens; Australia	15:49.46	Quinton Hurley; New Zealand	15:53.08	Wesley Roberts; Cook Islands	16:03.39
50m backstroke	Jack Anderson; New Zealand	26.25	Joshua Edwards-Smith; Australia	26.34	Andrew Jeffcoat; New Zealand	26.38
100m backstroke	Joshua Edwards-Smith; Australia	56.78	Andrew Jeffcoat; New Zealand	56.95	Jack Anderson; New Zealand	56.96
200m backstroke	Joshua Edwards-Smith; Australia	2:01.95	Andrew Jeffcoat; New Zealand	2:04.19	Callum Prime; New Zealand	2:07.05
50m breaststroke	Epeli Rabua; Fiji	29.34	Jonathan Rutter; New Zealand	29.35	Taichi Vakasama; Fiji	29.36
100m breaststroke	Jonathan Rutter; New Zealand	1:03.40	Taichi Vakasama; Fiji	1:03.84	Epeli Rabua; Fiji	1:03.84
200m breaststroke	Jonathan Rutter; New Zealand	2:15.54	Taichi Vakasama; Fiji	2:17.39	Finn O'Connor; Australia	2:18.70
50m butterfly	Carter Swift; New Zealand	24.66	Wilrich Coetzee; New Zealand	24.94	Alex Quach; Australia	25.50
100m butterfly	Oliver Nash; Australia	54.68	Wilrich Coetzee; New Zealand	54.85	Alex Quach; Australia	55.53
200m butterfly	Wilrich Coetzee; New Zealand	2:03.02	Alex Quach; Australia	2:04.44	David van der Star; New Zealand	2:06.19
200m individual medley	Jonathan Rutter; New Zealand	2:04.07	Callum Prime; New Zealand	2:05.96	Brandon Schuster; Samoa	2:07.04
400 individual medley	Jonathan Rutter; New Zealand	4:27.47	Brandon Schuster; Samoa	4:30.32	Lachlan Colquhoun; Australia	4:32.53
4 × 100m freestyle relay	New Zealand	3:25.38	Australia	3:28.05	Hawaii	3:34.33
4 × 200m freestyle relay	Australia	7:34.02	New Zealand	7:34.85	Hawaii	8:16.09
4 × 100m medley relay	New Zealand	3:45.64	Australia	3:48.07	Fiji	3:56.78
5km Open water	Ethan Owens; Australia Lachlan Colquhoun; Australia	1:00:04.82	Not awarded		David Boles; New Zealand	1:02:13.88
10km Open water	Ethan Owens; Australia	1:42:28	Lachlan Colquhoun; Australia	2:01:45	David Boles; New Zealand	2:03:54

=== Women's events ===
Event	Gold		Silver		Bronze	
50m freestyle	Rebecca Jacobson; Australia	26.05	Rebecca Moynihan; New Zealand	26.06	Paige Flynn; New Zealand	26.34
100m freestyle	Rebecca Jacobson; Australia	56.64	Paige Flynn; New Zealand	57.06	Rebecca Moynihan; New Zealand	57.30
200m freestyle	Rebecca Jacobson; Australia	2:01.74	Sharni Robinson; Australia	2:03.43	Grace Monahan; Hawaii	2:04.56
400m freestyle	Phoebe Hines; Australia	4:18.96	Sharni Robinson; Australia	4:18.96	Caitlin Deans; New Zealand	4:24.64
800m freestyle	Phoebe Hines; Australia	8:46.69	Sharni Robinson; Australia	8:48.07	Caitlin Deans; New Zealand	8:58.28
50m backstroke	Paige Flynn; New Zealand	29.62	Lushavel Stickland; Samoa Grace Monahan; Hawaii	30.37	Not awarded	
100m backstroke	Paige Flynn; New Zealand	1:03.32	Lushavel Stickland; Samoa	1:06.72	Cheyenne Rova; Fiji	1:08.55
200m backstroke	Gina McCarthy; New Zealand	2:17.74	Caitlin Deans; New Zealand	2:21.31	Grace Monahan; Hawaii	2:21.85
50m breaststroke	Bronagh Ryan; New Zealand	32.88	Lauren Gastevich; Australia	33.40	Moana Wind; Fiji	34.08
100m breaststroke	Bronagh Ryan; New Zealand	1:10.97	Maile Lawson; Hawaii	1:11.45	Lauren Gastevich; Australia	1:12.96
200m breaststroke	Lauren Gastevich; Australia	2:34.56	Maile Lawson; Hawaii	2:34.91	Gina McCarthy; New Zealand	2:37.52
50m butterfly	Grace Monahan; Hawaii	28.09	Emily White; Australia	28.60	Sydnee Whitty; Hawaii	29.13
100m butterfly	Grace Monahan; Hawaii	1:01.84	Emily White; Australia	1:03.48	Sydnee Whitty; Hawaii	1:05.81
200m butterfly	Grace Monahan; Hawaii	2:15.38	Sharni Robinson; Australia	2:18.07	Emily White; Australia	2:23.61
200m individual medley	Lauren Gastevich; Australia	2:19.76	Gina McCarthy; New Zealand	2:20.04	Grace Monahan; Hawaii	2:21.78
400 individual medley	Grace Monahan; Hawaii	4:55.57	Gina McCarthy; New Zealand	4:56.73	Lauren Gastevich; Australia	4:56.73
4 × 100m freestyle relay	Australia	3:50.55	New Zealand	3:54.67	Hawaii	4:02.81
4 × 200m freestyle relay	Australia	8:22.28	New Zealand	8:40.77	Hawaii	8:41.52
4 × 100m medley relay	New Zealand	4:18.58	Australia	4:20.49	Hawaii	4:27.79
5km Open water	Phoebe Hines; Australia	1:03:17.20	Ebony Blackstone; Australia	1:03:40.01	Stefannie Gillespie; New Zealand	1:06:13.33
10km Open water	Phoebe Hines; Australia	2:08:18	Ebony Blackstone; Australia	2:09:39	Stefannie Gillespie; New Zealand	2:12:57

=== Mixed events ===
Event	Gold		Silver		Bronze	
4 × 50m freestyle relay	New Zealand	1:37.70	Australia	1:39.07	Hawaii	1:41.04
4 × 100m freestyle relay	New Zealand	3:35.36 NR	Australia	3:37.20	Hawaii	3:41.17
4 × 50m medley relay	New Zealand	1:49.78	Australia	1:49.92	Fiji	1:54.69
4 × 100m medley relay	New Zealand	4:01.60	Australia	4:02.58	Hawaii	4:09.02
