= Nael Roux =

French Polynesian swimmer

Personal information
- Born: 2005 or 2006 (age 19–20)

Sport
- Country: French Polynesia
- Sport: Swimming
Medal record
Men's swimming
Representing Tahiti
Pacific Games
Gold medal – first place	2023 Honiara	1500m freestyle
Gold medal – first place	2023 Honiara	400m medley
Gold medal – first place	2023 Honiara	5km open water
Silver medal – second place	2023 Honiara	400m freestyle
Silver medal – second place	2023 Honiara	200m butterfly
Silver medal – second place	2023 Honiara	4 x 200m freestyle relay
Bronze medal – third place	2023 Honiara	200m breaststroke

Nael Roux (born 2005 or 2006) is a French Polynesian swimmer who has represented French Polynesia at the Pacific Games.

In October 2023 he set a record in the Tahiti to Moorea ocean swimming race.

At the 2023 Pacific Games in Honiara he won gold in the 1500 meters freestyle, 400 meters medley, and 5 km open water, silver in the 400 meters freestyle, 4 x 200 meters freestyle relay, and 200 meters butterfly, and bronze in the 200 meters breaststroke.
