= Nicole Hayes =

Palauan swimmer

Personal information
- National team: Palau
- Born: 5 April 1984 (age 42) Koror, Palau
- Height: 1.63 m (5 ft 4 in)
- Weight: 56 kg (123 lb)

Sport
- Sport: Swimming
- Strokes: Freestyle

Nicole Isau Hayes (born April 5, 1984) is a retired Palauan swimmer and national record holder, who specialized in sprint freestyle events. Hayes became the first Palauan Olympic swimmer in history when she swam at the 2000 Summer Olympics.

The inaugural year of Palau's participation in the Olympic Games, Hayes qualified for the 2000 Olympics via an Olympic Solidarity and a Universality place. She competed in the women's 100 m freestyle. Swimming in heat one, Hayes swam a new Palauan record of 1:00.89 to command a top position, placing forty-seventh overall on the morning prelims.

In addition to the Sydney Olympic Games, Hayes competed for the Republic of Palau at the following events:

- 1999 - Micronesian Games (Koror, Palau)

- 2000 - Oceania Swimming Championships (Christchurch, New Zealand)

- 2001 - 9th FINA World Swimming Championships (Fukuoka, Japan)

- 2002 - Micronesian Games (Phonpei, FSM)

- 2003 - XII South Pacific Games (Suva, Fiji)

- 2003 - 10th FINA World Aquatics Championships (Barcelona, Spain)
