= Rieneke Terink =

Dutch swimmer (born 1984)

Personal information
- Full name: Rieneke Terink
- Nationality: Netherlands
- Born: 13 March 1984 (age 42)

Sport
- Sport: Swimming
- Strokes: freestyle, medley
- Club: AZ&PC
Medal record
World Championships (SC)
Gold medal – first place	2014 Doha	4×100 m freestyle

Rieneke Terink (born 13 March 1984, Hengelo, Gelderland) is a Dutch swimmer who mainly specializes in freestyle and medley. She is currently training under the guidance of Fedor Hes alongside Robin van Aggele. Since 21 December 2008 she is the national record holder in the 400 m short course individual medley.

== Swimming career ==
Rieneke made her international debut at the 2006 European Aquatics Championships in Budapest, Hungary where she started in the 4 × 200 m freestyle relay which was eliminated in the heats. She also took part in the time-trials of the 2008 European Aquatics Championships. She failed to qualify for the Olympics in the 200 m freestyle and 4 × 200 m freestyle relay.

At the National Short Course Championships, in December 2008, she swam her first national record, in the 400 m individual medley.

== Personal bests ==
Short course
Event	Time	Date	Location
100 m freestyle	55.38	2008-10-19	Aachen, Germany
200 m freestyle	1:56.86	2008-12-20	Amsterdam, Netherlands
400 m freestyle	4:05.92	2008-12-19	Amsterdam, Netherlands
200 m medley	2:12.61	2008-12-19	Amsterdam, Netherlands
400 m medley	NR 4:38.49	2008-12-21	Amsterdam, Netherlands

Long course
Event	Time	Date	Location
100 m freestyle	57.41	2009-03-29	Lille, France
200 m freestyle	2:02.38	2009-04-16	Amsterdam, Netherlands
400 m freestyle	4:18.74	2009-04-19	Amsterdam, Netherlands
200 m medley	2:20.38	2009-03-28	Lille, France
400 m medley	4:58.46	2008-06-07	Eindhoven, Netherlands

== See also ==
- List of Dutch records in swimming
