= Ayumi Macías =

Mexican swimmer

Personal information
- Full name: Allyson Ayumi Macias Alba
- Nationality: Mexican
- Born: 1 January 1997 (age 29)
- Height: 179 cm (5 ft 10 in)

Sport
- Sport: Swimming
- Strokes: Freestyle
- College team: University of Arizona

Ayumi Macías (born 1 January 1997) is a Mexican swimmer. She competed in the women's 800 metre freestyle event at the 2017 World Aquatics Championships.
