= Swimming at the 2023 Pacific Games =

- Swimming pictogram for the Games
- Venue: Honiara Aquatic Center; DC Park (open water)
- Location: Honiara, Solomon Islands
- Dates: 20–25 November 2023

Swimming at the 2023 Pacific Games in Solomon Islands will be held on 20–25 November 2023 at the Honiara Aquatic Center in Honiara, with DC Park hosting the open water swim.

== Medal summary ==
=== Medal table ===
* Host nation (Solomon Islands)

Rank	Nation	Gold	Silver	Bronze	Total
1	New Caledonia	25	21	12	58
2	French Polynesia	5	9	14	28
3	Samoa	4	2	4	10
4	Cook Islands	3	2	2	7
5	Micronesia	3	1	0	4
6	Fiji	2	7	5	14
7	Northern Mariana Islands	1	0	3	4
8	American Samoa	0	1	1	2
9	Papua New Guinea	0	0	1	1
Totals (9 entries)		43	43	42	128

=== Men's ===
Event	Gold		Silver		Bronze	
50 m freestyle	Hansel McCaig (FIJ)	23.22	David Young (FIJ)	23.29	Hector Junior Langkilde (SAM)	23.37
100 m freestyle	Wesley Roberts (COK)	50.05	John-William Dabin (NCL)	51.02	Ethan Dumesnil (NCL)	51.18
200 m freestyle	Nathan Hudan (NCL)	1:59.71	John-William Dabin (NCL)	2:01.78	Wesley Roberts (COK)	2:02.32
400 m freestyle	Wesley Roberts (COK)	3:58.41	Nael Roux (TAH)	3:58.81	John-William Dabin (NCL)	3:58.86
1500 m freestyle	Nael Roux (TAH)	16:07.38	Baptiste Savignac (NCL)	16:43.17	Enzo Kernivinen (TAH)	17:00.50
50 m backstroke	Keha Desbordes (TAH)	26.20	Ethan Dumesnil (NCL)	26.70	Teiva Gehin (TAH)	26.93
100 m backstroke	Keha Desbordes (TAH)	57.53	Ethan Dumesnil (NCL)	58.17	Chrissander Cerda (NCL)	58.48
200 m backstroke	John-William Dabin (NCL)	2:06.83	Chrissander Cerda (NCL)	2:08.75	Rohutu Teahui (TAH)	2:10.37
50 m breaststroke	Tasi Limtiaco (FSM)	29.17	Micah Masei (ASA)	29.48	Alexandre Gane (NCL)	29.60
100 m breaststroke	Tasi Limtiaco (FSM)	1:03.60	Alexandre Gane (NCL)	1:05.36	Micah Masei (ASA)	1:05.80
200 m breaststroke	Tasi Limtiaco (FSM)	2:23.98	Alexandre Gane (NCL)	2:25.53	Nael Roux (TAH)	2:29.10
50 m butterfly	Ethan Dumesnil (NCL)	24.31	Wesley Roberts (COK)	24.67	Thibaut Mary (NCL)	24.86
100 m butterfly	Ethan Dumesnil (NCL)	54.82	Thibaut Mary (NCL)	55.29	Isaiah Aleksenko (NMI)	55.38
200 m butterfly	Isaiah Aleksenko (NMI)	2:05.86	Nael Roux (TAH)	2:09.52	Baptiste Savignac (NCL)	2:11.80
200 m individual medley	John-William Dabin (NCL)	2:03.81	Alexandre Gane (NCL)	2:09.33	Wesley Roberts (COK)	2:09.81
400 m individual medley	Nael Roux (TAH)	4:41.15	Tasi Limtiaco (FSM)	4:44.99	Baptiste Savignac (NCL)	4:50.73
4 × 100 m freestyle relay	New Caledonia	3:32.31	Samoa	3:38.50	French Polynesia	3:40.51
4 × 200 m freestyle relay	New Caledonia	7:38.62	French Polynesia	8:02.27	Northern Mariana Islands	8:17.38
4 × 100 m medley relay	New Caledonia	3:50.80	French Polynesia	3:58.10	Northern Mariana Islands	3:59.97
5 km open water	Nael Roux (TAH)	58:39.88	John-William Dabin (NCL)	58:46.43	Enzo Costa-Lacombe (TAH)	58:49.98

=== Women's ===
Event	Gold		Silver		Bronze	
50 m freestyle	Olivia Borg (SAM)	26.55	Malou Douillard (NCL)	26.88	Anahira McCutcheon (FIJ)	26.91
100 m freestyle	Olivia Borg (SAM)	58.60	Malou Douillard (NCL)	58.83	Anahira McCutcheon (FIJ)	59.54
200 m freestyle	Lara Grangeon (NCL)	2:08.05	Marine Erout (NCL)	2:09.90	Olivia Borg (SAM)	2:11.25
400 m freestyle	Lara Grangeon (NCL)	4:24.85	Maiana Flament (NCL)	4:34.30	Lili Paillisse (TAH)	4:42.14
800 m freestyle	Lara Grangeon (NCL)	9:10.24	Maiana Flament (NCL)	9:22.21	Lili Paillisse (TAH)	9:27.91
50 m backstroke	Malou Douillard (NCL)	30.74	Anahira McCutcheon (FIJ)	31.07	Deotille Videau (TAH)	31.59
100 m backstroke	Lara Grangeon (NCL)	1:05.57	Malou Douillard (NCL)	1:07.39	Anahira McCutcheon (FIJ)	1:08.62
200 m backstroke	Lara Grangeon (NCL)	2:19.71	Deotille Videau (TAH)	2:28.93	Salani Sa'aga (SAM)	2:28.93
50 m breaststroke	Lanihei Connolly (COK)	33.21	Kelera Mudunasoko (FIJ)	33.42	Georgia-Leigh Vele (PNG)	34.75
100 m breaststroke	Kelera Mudunasoko (FIJ)	1:13.01	Lanihei Connolly (COK)	1:14.32	Manon Baldovini (NCL)	1:16.45
200 m breaststroke	Lara Grangeon (NCL)	2:38.61	Kelera Mudunasoko (FIJ)	2:41.98	Manon Baldovini (NCL)	2:44.11
50 m butterfly	Olivia Borg (SAM)	27.83	Lillie Freulon (NCL)	28.01	Malou Douillard (NCL)	28.30
100 m butterfly	Olivia Borg (SAM)	1:01.54	Lillie Freulon (NCL)	1:01.93	Malou Douillard (NCL)	1:04.13
200 m butterfly	Lara Grangeon (NCL)	2:15.18	Olivia Borg (SAM)	2:23.21	Deotille Videau (TAH)	2:23.28
200 m individual medley	Lara Grangeon (NCL)	2:20.06	Deotille Videau (TAH)	2:28.40	Maiana Flament (NCL)	2:29.67
400 m individual medley	Lara Grangeon (NCL)	5:01.34	Maiana Flament (NCL)	5:12.04	Deotille Videau (TAH)	5:16.19
4 × 100 m freestyle relay	New Caledonia	4:01.15	French Polynesia	4:09.58	Fiji	4:10.74
4 × 200 m freestyle relay	New Caledonia	8:41.52	French Polynesia	9:13.24	Fiji	9:18.98
4 × 100 m medley relay	New Caledonia	4:23.14	Fiji	4:32.51	French Polynesia	4:50.78
5 km open water	Lara Grangeon (NCL)	1:04:26.37	Maiana Flament (NCL)	1:06:00.64	Lili Paillisse (TAH)	1:06:01.32

=== Mixed ===
Event	Gold		Silver		Bronze	
4 × 50 m freestyle relay	New Caledonia	1:39.24	Fiji	1:39.88 NR	Samoa	1:40.76
4 × 50 m medley relay	New Caledonia	1:51.62	Fiji	1:52.01	French Polynesia	1:52.30
4 × 1.25 km open water relay	New Caledonia	1:06:46.53	French Polynesia	1:16:04.17	–	–

== See also ==
- Swimming at the Pacific Games
