= Roylin Akiwo =

Palauan swimmer

Personal information
- Nationality: Palauan
- Born: 26 June 2000 (age 26)

Sport
- Sport: Swimming

Roylin Akiwo (born 26 June 2000) is a Palauan swimmer. She competed in the women's 50 metre backstroke event at the 2018 FINA World Swimming Championships (25 m), in Hangzhou, China.
