= Diana Basho =

Albanian swimmer (born 2000)

Personal information
- Nationality: Albanian
- Born: 5 December 2000 (age 25)

Sport
- Sport: Swimming

Diana Basho (born 5 December 2000) is an Albanian swimmer. She competed in the women's 200 metre freestyle event at the 2017 World Aquatics Championships.
