= Fiji at the 2025 World Aquatics Championships =

- Flag of Fiji
- World Aquatics code: FIJ
- National federation: Fiji Swimming
- Website: fijiswimming.org

in Singapore
- Competitors: 4 in 1 sport
- Medals: Gold 0 Silver 0 Bronze 0 Total 0

World Aquatics Championships appearances
- 1998; 2001; 2003; 2005; 2007; 2009; 2011; 2013; 2015; 2017; 2019; 2022; 2023; 2024; 2025

Fiji competed at the 2025 World Aquatics Championships in Singapore from 11 July to 3 August 2025.

== Competitors ==
The following is the list of competitors in the Championships.

Sport	Men	Women	Total
Swimming	2	2	4
Total	2	2	4

== Swimming ==
Men

Athlete	Event	Heat		Semifinal		Final	
Athlete	Event	Time	Rank	Time	Rank	Time	Rank
Samuel Yalimaiwai	50 m breaststroke	28.54 NR	52	Did not advance			
Samuel Yalimaiwai	100 m breaststroke	1:06.37	62	Did not advance			
David Young	50 m freestyle	22.32	35	Did not advance			
David Young	50 m butterfly	24.11	40	Did not advance			

Women

Athlete	Event	Heat		Semifinal		Final	
Athlete	Event	Time	Rank	Time	Rank	Time	Rank
Anahira McCutcheon	50 m freestyle	25.84 NR	40	Did not advance			
Anahira McCutcheon	100 m freestyle	57.76	43	Did not advance			
Marseleima Moss	50 m backstroke	32.34	58	Did not advance			
Marseleima Moss	200 m backstroke	2:30.72	41	Did not advance			
