= Flags of Oceania =

A map of Oceania with national flags, excluding Southeast Asia and dependent territories

This is a gallery of national and subnational flags of Oceania.

== Flags of Oceanian sovereign states ==
| Flag | Date | Use | Description |
|---|---|---|---|
| | 1908–present | Flag of Australia; See also: List of Australian flags | A British Blue Ensign defaced with the white seven-point Commonwealth Star in the lower hoist quarter and five white stars of the Southern Cross in the fly half. |
| | 1970–present | Flag of Fiji; See also: List of Fijian flags | A cyan British Blue Ensign defaced with the shield of Fiji's coat of arms in the fly half. |
| | 1979–present | Flag of Kiribati | A horizontal bicolour of red and blue with a gold frigatebird flying over the rising sun with seventeen rays centered on the upper half and three white wavy horizontal stripes on the lower half. |
| | 1979–present | Flag of the Marshall Islands | A blue field with two diagonal stripes of orange and white radiating from the lower hoist-side corner to the upper fly-side corner and a large white star with four large rays and twenty small rays on the upper hoist-side corner above the stripes. |
| | 1978–present | Flag of the Federated States of Micronesia; See also: List of Micronesian flags | A light blue field with four white five-pointed stars arranged in a diamond pattern in the center. |
| | 1968–present | Flag of Nauru; See also: List of Nauruan flags | A blue field with a thin yellow horizontal stripe across the center and a large white twelve-pointed star below the stripe and near the hoist-side. |
| | 1902–present | Flag of New Zealand; See also: List of New Zealand flags | A British Blue Ensign defaced with four red stars with white borders in the shape of the Southern Cross in the fly half. |
| | 1981–present | Flag of Palau; See also: List of Palauan flags | A light blue field with a large yellow disk slightly shifted towards the hoist side. |
| | 1971–present | Flag of Papua New Guinea; See also: List of Papua New Guinean flags | Divided diagonally from the upper hoist-side corner to the lower fly-side corner: the upper triangle is red with a soaring Raggiana bird-of-paradise and the lower triangle is black with the Southern Cross of four larger white five-pointed stars and a smaller star. |
| | 1962–present | Flag of Samoa; See also: List of Samoan flags | A red field with a blue rectangle on the upper hoist-side quadrant bearing the Southern Cross of four larger white five-pointed stars and a smaller star in the center. |
| | 1977–present | Flag of Solomon Islands | A thin yellow stripe dividing diagonally from the lower hoist-side corner to the upper fly-side corner: the upper triangle is blue with five white five-pointed stars arranged in an X pattern and the lower triangle is green. |
| | 1875–present | Flag of Tonga | A red field with a white rectangle bearing a red Greek Cross in the upper hoist-side corner. |
| | 1997–present | Flag of Tuvalu | A cyan British Blue Ensign defaced with stars that represent the nine islands which comprise Tuvalu in the fly half. |
| | 1980–present | Flag of Vanuatu; See also: List of Vanuatuan flags | A horizontal bicolor of red and green with a golden pall, fimbriated in black, with a black triangle filling the hoist-side space (alternately, a golden fillet pall surmounting a black gusset) and two gold crossed namele cycad fronds encircled in a gold boar tusk centered on the triangle. |

== Flags of Oceanian dependencies and other territories ==
| Flag | Date | Use | State (status) | Description |
|---|---|---|---|---|
| | 1960–present | Flag of American Samoa | United States (unincorporated and unorganized territory) | A red-edged white triangle pointing towards the hoist charged with a bald eagle clutching a war club and a fly-whisk. The white triangle divides a dark blue field into two separate triangles. |
| | 2002–present | Flag of Christmas Island | Australia (external territory) | Blue and green diagonal bicolour charged with a Southern Cross of four seven-pointed white stars and one smaller five-pointed white star on the blue half (lower hoist), a golden bosun bird in gold on the green half (upper fly), and a gold circle in the centre containing the shape of the island in green. |
| | 2004–present | Flag of the Cocos (Keeling) Islands | Australia (external territory) | A green field with a palm tree on a gold disc in the canton, a gold crescent in the centre of the flag and a gold Southern Cross in the fly. |
| | 2006–present | Flag of Easter Island | Chile (special territory) | A white flag with a red reimiro in the centre. |
| | 1984–present | Flag of French Polynesia | France (overseas country and collectivity) | Two red horizontal bands encase a white Spanish fess, with the coat of arms centred on the white stripe. |
| | 1948–present | Flag of Guam | United States (unincorporated and organized territory) | A dark blue background with a thin red border and the Seal in the center. |
| | 2010–present | Flag of New Caledonia | France (sui generis collectivity) | The flag of France is used for official purposes. |
| | 1979–present | Flag of Norfolk Island | Australia (external territory) | A Norfolk Island pine in a central white stripe between two vertical green stripes. |
| | 1948–present | Flag of the Northern Mariana Islands | United States (commonwealth) | A circle of flowers and plants with a gray latte stone and a white star on a blue field. |
| | 1984–present | Flag of the Pitcairn Islands | United Kingdom (overseas territory) | A British Blue Ensign with the Pitcairn coat of arms defaced on the fly. |
| | 2009–present | Flag of Tokelau | New Zealand (dependent territory) | A yellow Tokelauan canoe sailing towards the Southern Cross represented by four white stars on a blue field. |
| | 1976–present | Flag of Wake Island (unofficial) | United States (minor outlying island) | Horizontally divided between white and red, with a blue pentagon on the hoist, whereupon is found a map of the atoll and the words Wake Island in blue on a gold disc, which is surrounded by three gold stars. |
| | 1985–present | Flag of Wallis and Futuna (unofficial) | France (overseas collectivity) | The Flag of France is used for official purposes. |

== Flags of Oceanian cities ==
Flags of cities with over 1 million inhabitants.

Flag of Adelaide, South Australia

Flag of Brisbane, Queensland, Australia

Flag of Melbourne, Victoria, Australia

Flag of Perth, Western Australia

Flag of Sydney, New South Wales, Australia

== Historical flags ==
| Flag | Date | Use | Description |
|---|---|---|---|
| | ?–? | Flag of the Austral Islands | The third of the flag closest to the flagpole is white and says 'ARCHIPEL DES ILES AUSTRALES' in black. The rest of the flag is divided into five horizontal stripes of yellow, red, white, green, and blue. |
| | 1901–1903 | Flag of Australia | Six-pointed Commonwealth star and Delta Crucis. |
| | 1903–1908 | Flag of Australia | Seven-pointed Delta Crucis. |
| | 1867–1869 | Flag of the Kingdom of Bau | A horizontal tricolour of white, blue, and red, with a rising sun in the blue stripe and a crown in the canton. |
| | 1893–1901 | Flag of the Cook Islands Federation | A red-white-red tricolour with the Union Jack in the canton, in the center of which is a palm tree on a white disc. |
| | 1973–1979 | Flag of the Cook Islands | Green flag with a ring of fifteen gold stars in the fly. |
| | 1865–1867 | Flag of the Confederacy of Independent Kingdoms of Fiji | A white eight-pointed star on a blue field. |
| | 1871–1874 | Flag of the Kingdom of Fiji | A dove carrying a wreath in its beak on a red shield underneath a crown, all on a vertical bicolour of white and sky blue. |
| | 1877–1883 | Flag of the Colony of Fiji | British blue ensign defaced with the colonial badge in the fly. |
| | 1883–1903 | Flag of the Colony of Fiji | British blue ensign defaced with the colonial badge in the fly. |
| | 1903–1908 | Flag of the Colony of Fiji | British blue ensign defaced with the colonial badge on the fly. |
| | 1908–1924 | Flag of the Colony of Fiji | British blue ensign defaced with the Fijian coat of arms on a white roundel. |
| | 1924–1970 | Flag of the Colony of Fiji | British blue ensign defaced with the Fijian coat of arms. |
| | 1869–1871 | Flag of the Confederation of Lau | Divided horizontally between white and red, with a red Greek cross in the canton. |
| | 1906–1953 | Flag of the British New Hebrides | British blue ensign defaced with the colonial badge on the fly. |
| | 1953–1980 | Flag of the British New Hebrides | British blue ensign defaced with the colonial badge on the fly. |
| | 1867–1870 | Flag of the Colony of New South Wales | British blue ensign defaced with the letters "NSW" on the fly. |
| | 1870–1876 | Flag of the Colony of New South Wales | British blue ensign defaced with a Southern Cross surmounted by a Crown. |
| | 1835–1840 | Flag of the United Tribes of New Zealand | A St. George's cross with the canton consisting of a blue field, another St. George's cross with white fimbriation, and a white, eight-pointed star in each of the quarters. |
| | 1870–1876 | Flag of the Colony of Queensland | British blue ensign defaced with a portrait of Queen Elizabeth II in the flag, labeled "QUEENSLAND". |
| | 1858–1888 | Flag of the Kingdom of Rarotonga | A red field with a white horizontal stripe, on which are three blue stars. |
| | 1888–1893 | Flag of the Kingdom of Rarotonga | A red field with a white horizontal stripe through the center and the Union Jack in the canton, and three blue stars in the fly. |
| | 1906–1947 | Flag of the British Solomon Islands | British blue ensign defaced with the colonial badge on the fly. |
| | 1947–1956 | Flag of the British Solomon Islands | British blue ensign defaced with the colonial badge on the fly. |
| | 1956–1966 | Flag of the British Solomon Islands | British blue ensign defaced with the colonial badge on the fly. |
| | 1966–1977 | Flag of the British Solomon Islands | British blue ensign defaced with the coat of arms of the Solomon Islands on the fly. |
| | 1870–1876 | Flag of the Colony of South Australia | British blue ensign defaced with the Southern Cross on a black roundel in the fly. |
| | 1876–1901 | Flag of the Colony of South Australia | British blue ensign defaced with an image of Britannia and an Aboriginal Australian man on a roundel on the fly. Remained in use as the state flag from 1901–1904. |
| | 1875 | Flag of the Colony of Tasmania | British blue ensign with the Southern Cross in the fly and a white cross over all. |
| | 1976–1978 | Flag of the Colony of Tuvalu | British blue ensign defaced with the colonial badge on the fly. |
| | 1978–1995 | Flag of Tuvalu | Cyan British ensign with nine gold stars on the fly, representing the islands of Tuvalu. |
| | October – December 1995 | Flag of Tuvalu | Cyan British ensign with eight gold stars on the fly. |
| | 1995–1997 | Flag of Tuvalu | Five uneven horizontal stripes of red, white, cyan, white and red again, over which are overlaid eight white stars. A white triangle radiates from the hoist, whereupon is found the coat of arms of Tuvalu. |
| | 1870–1877 | Flag of the Colony of Victoria | British blue ensign defaced with the Southern Cross on the fly. |
| | 1877 | Flag of the Colony of Victoria | British blue ensign defaced with the Southern Cross on a blue shield surmounted by a Crown, all on a white roundel on the fly. |
| | 1877–1901 | Flag of the Colony of Victoria | British blue ensign defaced with a Southern Cross surmounted by a Crown on the fly. |
| | 1870–1901 | Flag of the Colony of Western Australia | British blue ensign defaced with a fly-facing black swan on a gold roundel. Remained in use as the state flag from 1901–1953. |

== See also ==
Lists of flags of Oceanian countries

- List of Australian flags
- List of Fijian flags
- List of Nauruan flags
- List of New Zealand flags
- List of Palauan flags
- List of Papua New Guinean flags
- List of Samoan flags
- List of Vanuatuan flags
