= Fiji at the 2023 World Aquatics Championships =

- Flag of Fiji
- World Aquatics code: FIJ
- National federation: Fiji Swimming
- Website: fijiswimming.org

in Fukuoka, Japan
- Competitors: 4 in 2 sports
- Medals: Gold 0 Silver 0 Bronze 0 Total 0

World Aquatics Championships appearances
- 1998; 2001; 2003; 2005; 2007; 2009; 2011; 2013; 2015; 2017; 2019; 2022; 2023; 2024; 2025

Fiji is set to compete at the 2023 World Aquatics Championships in Fukuoka, Japan from 14 to 30 July.

== Diving ==
Fiji entered 1 diver.

Men

Athlete	Event	Preliminaries		Semifinals		Final	
Athlete	Event	Points	Rank	Points	Rank	Points	Rank
Maori Pomeroy-Farrell	1 m springboard	224.00	60	—N/a		did not advance	
Maori Pomeroy-Farrell	3 m springboard	276.45	57	did not advance			

== Swimming ==
Fiji entered 3 swimmers.

Men

Athlete	Event	Heat		Semifinal		Final	
Athlete	Event	Time	Rank	Time	Rank	Time	Rank
Hansel McCaig	100 metre freestyle	52.10	73	Did not advance			
Hansel McCaig	50 metre backstroke	26.97	49	Did not advance			
David Young	50 metre freestyle	22.87 NR	50	Did not advance			
David Young	50 metre butterfly	Disqualified		Did not advance			

Women

Athlete	Event	Heat		Semifinal		Final	
Athlete	Event	Time	Rank	Time	Rank	Time	Rank
Kelera Mudunasoko	100 metre breaststroke	1:15.77	53	Did not advance			
Kelera Mudunasoko	200 metre breaststroke	2:46.09	35	Did not advance			
