= 2012 Fiji floods =

2012 Fiji floods may refer to:

- January 2012 Fiji floods
- March 2012 Fiji floods
