= Fiji at the 2013 World Aquatics Championships =

- Flag of Fiji
- FINA code: FIJ
- National federation: Fiji Swimming Federation

in Barcelona, Spain
- Competitors: 3 in 1 sports
- Medals: Gold 0 Silver 0 Bronze 0 Total 0

World Aquatics Championships appearances
- 1998; 2001; 2003; 2005; 2007; 2009; 2011; 2013; 2015; 2017; 2019; 2022; 2023; 2024

Fiji competed at the 2013 World Aquatics Championships in Barcelona, Spain between 19 July and 4 August 2013.

== Swimming ==
Fijian swimmers achieved qualifying standards in the following events (up to a maximum of 2 swimmers in each event at the A-standard entry time, and 1 at the B-standard):

Men

Athlete	Event	Heat		Semifinal		Final	
Athlete	Event	Time	Rank	Time	Rank	Time	Rank
Douglas Miller	100 m breaststroke	1:09.19	66	did not advance			
Douglas Miller	200 m individual medley	2:14.27	50	did not advance			

Women

Athlete	Event	Heat		Semifinal		Final	
Athlete	Event	Time	Rank	Time	Rank	Time	Rank
Matelita Buadromo	200 m freestyle	2:12.31	39	did not advance			
Matelita Buadromo	200 m individual medley	2:27.56	41	did not advance			
Caroline Puamau	50 m backstroke	30.36	39	did not advance			
Caroline Puamau	100 m butterfly	1:04.72	43	did not advance			
