= Fiji at the 2017 World Aquatics Championships =

- Flag of Fiji
- FINA code: FIJ
- National federation: Fiji Swimming Federation

in Budapest, Hungary
- Competitors: 3 in 1 sport
- Medals: Gold 0 Silver 0 Bronze 0 Total 0

World Aquatics Championships appearances
- 1998; 2001; 2003; 2005; 2007; 2009; 2011; 2013; 2015; 2017; 2019; 2022; 2023; 2024

Fiji competed at the 2017 World Aquatics Championships in Budapest, Hungary from 14 July to 30 July.

== Swimming ==
Fiji has received a Universality invitation from FINA to send three swimmers (two men and one woman) to the World Championships.

Athlete	Event	Heat		Semifinal		Final	
Athlete	Event	Time	Rank	Time	Rank	Time	Rank
Epeli Rabua	Men's 50 m breaststroke	30.44	62	did not advance			
Epeli Rabua	Men's 100 m breaststroke	1:05.12	55	did not advance			
Matelita Buadromo	Women's 100 m freestyle	58.53	45	did not advance			
Matelita Buadromo	Women's 100 m butterfly	1:04.94	39	did not advance			
Cheyenne Rova	Women's 50 m freestyle	27.05	48	did not advance			
Cheyenne Rova	Women's 100 m backstroke	1:07.10	47	did not advance			
