= Fiji at the 2019 World Aquatics Championships =

- Flag of Fiji
- FINA code: FIJ
- National federation: Fiji Swimming Federation

in Gwangju, South Korea
- Medals: Gold 0 Silver 0 Bronze 0 Total 0

World Aquatics Championships appearances
- 1998; 2001; 2003; 2005; 2007; 2009; 2011; 2013; 2015; 2017; 2019; 2022; 2023; 2024

Fiji competed at the 2019 World Aquatics Championships in Gwangju, South Korea from 12 to 28 July.

== Swimming ==
Fiji entered four swimmers.

Men

| Athlete | Event | Heat | | Semifinal | | Final | |
| Athlete | Event | Time | Rank | Time | Rank | Time | Rank |
|---|---|---|---|---|---|---|---|
| Netani Ross | 100 m freestyle | 52.12 | 73 | did not advance | | | |
| Netani Ross | 100 m backstroke | 1:00.30 | 56 | did not advance | | | |
| Taichi Vakasama | 100 m breaststroke | 1:03.18 | 54 | did not advance | | | |
| Taichi Vakasama | 200 m breaststroke | 2:18.23 | 46 | did not advance | | | |

Women

| Athlete | Event | Heat | | Semifinal | | Final | |
| Athlete | Event | Time | Rank | Time | Rank | Time | Rank |
|---|---|---|---|---|---|---|---|
| Matelita Buadromo | 50 m freestyle | 27.00 | 48 | did not advance | | | |
| Matelita Buadromo | 100 m freestyle | 57.93 | 47 | did not advance | | | |
| Moana Wind | 100 m breaststroke | 1:16.56 | 46 | did not advance | | | |
| Moana Wind | 100 m butterfly | 1:10.86 | 48 | did not advance | | | |
