= Fiji at the 2022 World Aquatics Championships =

- Flag of Fiji
- FINA code: FIJ
- National federation: Fiji Swimming Federation

in Budapest, Hungary
- Competitors: 2 in 1 sport
- Medals: Gold 0 Silver 0 Bronze 0 Total 0

World Aquatics Championships appearances
- 1998; 2001; 2003; 2005; 2007; 2009; 2011; 2013; 2015; 2017; 2019; 2022; 2023; 2024

Fiji competed at the 2022 World Aquatics Championships in Budapest, Hungary from 18 June to 3 July.

== Swimming ==
Fijian swimmers have achieved qualifying standards in the following events.

Athlete	Event	Heat		Semifinal		Final	
Athlete	Event	Time	Rank	Time	Rank	Time	Rank
Taichi Vakasama	Men's 100 m breaststroke	1:02.86	37	did not advance			
Taichi Vakasama	Men's 200 m breaststroke	2:17.49	30	did not advance			
Cheyenne Rova	Women's 50 m freestyle	27.82	50	did not advance			
Cheyenne Rova	Women's 100 m freestyle	1:00.75	40	did not advance			
