= Fiji at the 2024 World Aquatics Championships =

- Flag of Fiji
- FINA code: FIJ
- National federation: Fiji Swimming
- Website: fijiswimming.org

in Doha, Qatar
- Competitors: 2 in 1 sport
- Medals: Gold 0 Silver 0 Bronze 0 Total 0

World Aquatics Championships appearances
- 1998; 2001; 2003; 2005; 2007; 2009; 2011; 2013; 2015; 2017; 2019; 2022; 2023; 2024

Fiji is set to compete at the 2024 World Aquatics Championships in Doha, Qatar from 2 to 18 February.

== Swimming ==
Fiji entered 2 swimmers.

Men

Athlete	Event	Heat		Semifinal		Final	
Athlete	Event	Time	Rank	Time	Rank	Time	Rank
Hansel McCaig	50 metre freestyle	23.30	45	Did not advance			
Hansel McCaig	100 metre freestyle	51.77	=55	Did not advance			

Women

Athlete	Event	Heat		Semifinal		Final	
Athlete	Event	Time	Rank	Time	Rank	Time	Rank
Kelera Mudunasoko	100 metre breaststroke	1:15.64	44	Did not advance			
Kelera Mudunasoko	200 metre breaststroke	2:46.29	28	Did not advance			
