= Flag of Tuvalu =

Tuvalu
- Use: National flag and ensign
- Proportion: 1:2
- Adopted: 1 October 1978 (original); 11 April 1997 (readopted)
- Design: A light blue field with the Union Jack in the canton and nine yellow five-pointed stars on the fly half
- Designed by: Vione Natano

The national flag of Tuvalu is a light blue field with the Union Jack in the canton and nine yellow five-pointed stars on the fly (right) half of the flag. The nine stars represent the nine islands of Tuvalu, while the Union Jack symbolises the country's connections to the United Kingdom and the Commonwealth. The flag was originally adopted on 1 October 1978, the day Tuvalu became independent.

From 1937 to 1975, Tuvalu flew the Blue Ensign of the Gilbert and Ellice Islands, which it was a part of. Tuvalu had its own Blue Ensign from 3 December 1976 to 1 October 1978, when it was a colony in its own right. On 1 October 1995, the government of Prime Minister Kamuta Latasi introduced a new flag in a move towards republicanism. However, the subsequent government under Prime Minister Bikenibeu Paeniu restored the flag adopted at independence on 11 April 1997.

== Design and symbolism ==
Each star in the flag of Tuvalu represents one of the country's nine islands.

The design of the Tuvaluan flag is outlined in the Tuvalu National Flag Act (enacted in 1995, amended in 1997, and revised in 2008). The act also grants the government the ability to authorise the flag's use on an ad hoc basis and to create further regulations regarding the flag's use in general.

The flag of Tuvalu is a light blue (officially azure) field with the Union Jack in the canton and nine yellow five-pointed stars spread diagonally on the fly half. The arrangement of the nine stars on the flag correspond to the location of Tuvalu's nine islands, with north pointing to the hoist (mast). Additionally, the yellow and blue reflect the colour of the islands in the ocean, while the Union Jack symbolises Tuvalu's ties to the United Kingdom and the Commonwealth.

The flag's width-to-length ratio is 1 to 2, the Union Jack covers a quarter of the flag's area, the stars are contained in the fly half, and the width of each star is equal to 1/12th of the flag's width. There is no official explanation as to why some of the stars point up while others point down, and proposals to have all the stars point up have not been successful. The design is similar to the flag of neighbouring Fiji.

== History ==
From 1916 to 1975, Tuvalu, then known as the Ellice Islands, was a constituent part of the British colony of the Gilbert and Ellice Islands. The Gilbert and Ellice Islands were granted a coat of arms in 1937, and a Blue Ensign defaced with the coat of arms was subsequently adopted as an unofficial colonial flag (made official in 1969). On 1 October 1975, the Ellice Islands separated from the Gilbert Islands and became the Colony of Tuvalu, and on 3 December 1976, Tuvalu received its own coat of arms. A Union Jack and a Blue Ensign defaced with the new coat of arms were adopted as the state flag and ensign, respectively. The coat of arms, which remained in use after independence, is a light blue (azure) shield with a maneaba building on top of green ground and eight wavy bars alternating between gold and blue. The shield has a golden border charged with eight mitre shells and eight banana leaves.

Flag of the Gilbert and Ellice Islands (1937–1976)

State flag of the Colony of Tuvalu (3 December 1976 – 1 October 1978)

State ensign of the Colony of Tuvalu (3 December 1976 – 1 October 1978)

Coat of arms of Tuvalu (3 December 1976 – present)

Tuvalu became a sovereign state on 1 October 1978, exactly three years after its separation from the Gilbert Islands (now Kiribati). It adopted a new national flag designed by Vione Natano and chosen from 40 proposals. On 1 October 1995, the 17th anniversary of Tuvalu's independence, a star was removed from the upper fly (top right), bringing the total number of stars to eight. The modification reflected the nation's original eight islands, as well as the name "Tuvalu", which means "eight standing together".

The government of Prime Minister Kamuta Latasi changed the flag again with the enactment of the Tuvalu National Flag Act on 22 December 1995. The new design consisted of a wide horizontal light blue band between two broad red bands, separated by thin white bands (i.e. white fimbriations). Eight white five-pointed stars were spread across the fly half, a reference to the original eight islands of Tuvalu, and near the hoist was a white triangle containing the Tuvaluan coat of arms. Latasi intended the move as a precursor to Tuvalu becoming a republic. However, the new flag proved unpopular among many Tuvaluans, particularly older residents, who supported the British monarchy and Tuvalu's relationship with the United Kingdom. Residents of the island of Niutao, for example, chopped down a flagpole immediately after the new flag was raised. Latasi was removed from power by a motion of no confidence on 18 December 1996, and the subsequent government of Otinielu Tausi restored the independence flag on 11 April 1997.

Flag of Tuvalu (1 October 1978 – 1 October 1995; 11 April 1997 – present)

Flag of Tuvalu (1 October 1995 – 22 December 1995)

Flag of Tuvalu (22 December 1995 – 11 April 1997)

== Civil ensigns ==
As per the 2022 Merchant Shipping Act, Tuvalu does not have a separate civil ensign used by its merchant ships. Specifically, the Act stipulates that "The National Flag shall be the proper national colours for a ship registered under this Act." In contrast, the 2022 Civil Aviation Act gives the minister responsible for transport and communication the authority to prescribe the design and colours of a Civil Air Ensign of Tuvalu.

== See also ==
- Flags of Oceania
  - Flag of Kiribati
