= List of Papua New Guinean flags =

This is a list of flags used in Papua New Guinea.

== National flag ==
Flag	Date	Use	Description
	1971–present	Flag of Papua New Guinea	Divided diagonally from the upper hoist-side corner to the lower fly-side corner: the upper triangle is red with a silhouette of the soaring Raggiana bird-of-paradise in yellow and the lower triangle is black with the Crux of four white larger five-pointed stars and a smaller star. Red and black have long been the colours of Papua New Guinea, the Raggiana bird-of-paradise is the national bird of the country, and the Southern Cross represents its position in the Southern Hemisphere. The original 1970 proposal by Hal Holman had a mainly negative reception, due to its appearance as that of a "mechanically contrived outcome", thus the alternative proposal attributed to Susan Karike was chosen instead.

== Flag of the governor-general ==
Flag	Date	Use	Description
	1975–present	Standard of the governor-general of Papua New Guinea	A dark blue field featuring a St. Edward's crown surmounted by a lion with the name "Papua New Guinea" on a scroll beneath it.

== Ensigns ==
Flag	Date	Use	Description
	1975–present	Naval ensign of Papua New Guinea	A White Ensign with the flag of Papua New Guinea in the canton.

== Provincial flags ==
Flag	Date	Use	Description
		Flag of the Autonomous Region of Bougainville	
		Flag of Central Province	
		Flag of Chimbu	
		Flag of Eastern Highlands	This flag depicts a spirit called Nokondi, which has caused some controversy from Christians who feel it is inappropriate.
		Flag of East New Britain	
		Flag of East Sepik	
		Flag of Enga	
		Flag of Gulf Province	
		Flag of Hela	
		Flag of Jiwaka	
		Flag of Madang	
		Flag of Manus	
		Flag of Milne Bay	
		Flag of Morobe	
		Flag of the National Capital District	
		Flag of New Ireland	
		Flag of Oro	
		Flag of Southern Highlands	
		Flag of Western Province	
		Flag of Western Highlands	
		Flag of West New Britain	
		Flag of Sandaun	

== Historical flags ==
=== Foreign powers' flags ===
Flag	Date	Use	Description
	1884–1971	Flag of the United Kingdom	A superimposition of the flags of England and Scotland with the Saint Patrick's Saltire (representing Ireland)
	1884–1899	Flag of the German New Guinea Company	A white field with the German tricolour on the canton and defaced with a black lion with a red sword
	1899–1918	Flag of the German Empire	A tricolour, made of three equal horizontal bands coloured black (top), white, and red (bottom)
	1899–1918	Colonial flag of the German Empire	A tricolour, made of three equal horizontal bands coloured black (top), white, and red (bottom) with The Reichsadler in the center
	1918–1921	Flag of the Weimar Republic	A triband made of three equal horizontal bands coloured black (top), red, and gold (bottom).
	1906–1971	Australian national flag	A Blue Ensign defaced with the seven-point Commonwealth Star in the lower hoist quarter and the five stars of the Southern Cross in the fly half
	1942–1944	Flag of the Empire of Japan	A white field with a red disc in the center

=== National flags ===
Flag	Date	Use	Description
	1884–1888	Flag of British New Guinea	A blue British ensign with a white disc in the fly featuring the Tudor Crown over the initials "N.G."
	1888–1906	Flag of British New Guinea	A blue British ensign with a white disc in the fly featuring the Tudor Crown over the initials "B.N.G."
	1906–1971	Flag of the Territory of Papua	A blue British ensign with a white disc in the fly featuring the Tudor Crown over the name "Papua"
	1921–1971	Flag of the Territory of New Guinea	A blue British ensign with a white disc in the fly featuring the Tudor Crown over the letters "T.N.G."

=== Viceregal flags ===
Flag	Date	Use	Description
	1906–1945	Flag of the lieutenant-governor of Papua	A Union Jack defaced with a white disc in the centre featuring the name "Papua" surmounted by a crown

=== Sporting flags ===
Flag	Date	Use	Description
	1965–1970	Specific flag for sporting events	Flag flown for the territory at international sporting events. A red and yellow Raggiana bird-of-paradise on a green field.

=== Proposed flags ===
Flag	Date	Use	Description
	Between 1884 and 1914	Proposed flags of German New Guinea	First design incorporating the horizontal black-white-red tricolour of the German Empire
	Between 1884 and 1914	Proposed flags of German New Guinea	Another design incorporating the horizontal black-white-red tricolour of the German Empire
	Between 1884 and 1914	Proposed flags of German New Guinea	Another design incorporating the horizontal black-white-red tricolour of the German Empire
	1970–1971	Proposed flag of Papua and New Guinea	A vertical tricolour of blue, gold, and green, with a white Southern Cross in the hoist and a white Raggiana bird-of-paradise at the fly. Designed by Hal Holman.
