= Emblem of Papua New Guinea =

- Armiger: Independent State of Papua New Guinea
- Adopted: 1 July 1971
- Shield: Bird-of-paradise proper
- Compartment: Traditional spear and kundu drum

The national emblem of Papua New Guinea consists of a bird-of-paradise over a traditional spear and a kundu drum. Designed by Hal Holman, an Australian artist working for the Papuan government, Holman was also involved in the design of the National flag. Both the emblem and the flag was accepted by the House of Assembly of Papua and New Guinea and signed into law as the National Identity Ordinance by the Administrator Sir Leslie Johnson on 24 June 1971. The ordinance came into effect after its publication in the Papua New Guinea Gazette of 1 July 1971.

== Description ==
DESCRIPTION OF THE NATIONAL EMBLEM.

The Papua New Guinea National Emblem is a partially-stylized representation of the widespread Bird of Paradise Genus paradisaea in display, head turned to its left, seated on the upturned grip of a horizontal Kundu drum with the drum-head to the right side of the bird, from behind which a horizontal ceremonial spear projects with the head to the left of the bird.

If coloured proper, the following colours should be used –

BIRD OF PARADISE

- Head …. …. …. …. …. Yellow
- Bill …. …. …. …. …. Grey-Blue
- Neck …. …. …. …. …. Black
- Breast …. …. …. …. …. Green with yellow band
- Abdomen …. …. …. …. …. Light brown, darkening to vent
- Wings and long tail feathers …. …. Brown (reddish)
- Display plumes …. …. …. …. …. Deep red (slightly brownish)

SPEAR

- Black, with white highlights.

KUNDU DRUM

- Drum head …. …. …. …. …. White
- Body …. …. …. …. …. Black, with white ornamentations
- Grip …. …. …. …. …. Black, with white highlights.

== History ==
North East New Guinea
Emblem	Period of use	Notes
	1914	The proposed coat of arms of German New Guinea by the diplomat Dr. Wilhelm Solf of the Imperial Colonial Office. Dr. Solf proposed and designed six new coats of arms of German colonies in 1914, however they were never officially accepted or used.
	1921–1971	The badge of the Territory of New Guinea granted in 1921, the territory was given to Australia as a mandate in the Treaty of Versailles, signed in 1919. The badge consisted of the letters T.N.G. below the St. Edwards Crown. The badge was placed on the blue ensign and used as an official flag.

South East New Guinea
Emblem	Period of use	Notes
	1884–1888	The badge consisting of the crown and the initials N.G. was used by the south eastern quarter of the island by the British New Guinea Protectorate. The protectorate was established in 1884 after an informal claim to the territory was made by the Premier of Queensland in 1883. The badge was also used in the flag of the territory, by being placed on the blue ensign.
	1888–1906	A new badge was used once the territory was formally annexed by Britain in 1888 and the name was changed to British New Guinea. The badge was also used in the flag of the territory, by being placed on the blue ensign. As for the governor, the badge is surrounded by garland and defaced on the Union Jack.
	1906–1971	The badge of Papua was used once the name and administration of the territory was changed in 1906. With the passage of the Australian Papua Act 1905, the territory was passed from Britain to Australia. The badge was also used in the flag of the territory, by being placed on the blue ensign.

Papua New Guinea
Emblem	Period of use	Notes
	1949–1971	The coat of arms of Australia was used by the territory after the Papua and New Guinea Act 1949 united the two administrative areas into one territory; the Territory of Papua and New Guinea.
	1971–present	On 1 July 1971 the National Identity Ordinance was passed into law by the House of Assembly. The ordinance introduced a new emblem for the territory, which was retained after independence by Papua New Guinea as an independent Commonwealth realm in 1975.

== See also ==
- Papua New Guinea
- History of Papua New Guinea
- Flag of Papua New Guinea
- Coats of arms of Oceania
- Hal Holman
- Wilhelm Solf
