= Susan Karike =

Woman of Papua New Guinea

- Born: Susan Hareho Karike c. 1955 – c. 1956; Mei'i, Gulf District, Territory of Papua and New Guinea
- Died: 11 April 2017 (aged 61); Port Moresby General Hospital; Korobosea, Papua New Guinea
- Citizenship: Papua New Guinea
- Known for: Designing the flag of Papua New Guinea

Susan Hareho Karike Huhume (1955/1956–11 April 2017) was a Papua New Guinean housewife. At age 15, she designed the colours of her country's national flag.

Karike married Nanny Huhume and they had four children and twelve grandchildren. She died on 11 April 2017, at age 61, following a stroke and was buried on 28 July 2017.

== Background ==
Karike was born in Mei'i, Gulf District, Territory of Papua and New Guinea; her birth date was sometime between 12 April 1955 and 11 February 1956. On 12 February 1971, Karike's school — the Catholic Mission School at Yule Island in Central Province — was visited by the Selection Committee on Constitutional Development. The committee already had a preliminary design for a new flag for Papua New Guinea, which had been designed by an Australian artist, Hal Holman. Nevertheless, they asked students to create a new colour palette for the flag. Karike did not believe the original colours of blue, yellow and green were traditional enough, nor did she like the vertical stripes that the flag was split into. She used a diagonal line and the colours red, black and yellow, as well as keeping the motifs of the Southern Cross and the bird of paradise. The new design for the flag was drawn in a page torn from her exercise book. This design was presented to the committee on 1 March 1971 and was formally adopted as the flag of Papua New Guinea on 4 March 1971.

== Awards and recognition ==
In 2017, the Papua New Guinea National Museum & Art Gallery was redeveloped and a new gallery was named the Susan Karike Gallery after Karike.

Despite designing the colours of the national flag, Karike's achievement went largely unrecognised during her lifetime. She received no pension from the government and lived in poverty. The three-month delay between her death and her burial was due to the fact that the Prime Minister's office had promised her family that she would have a state funeral, yet rescinded on this promise.

=== Gallery ===
Hal Holman's initial flag design

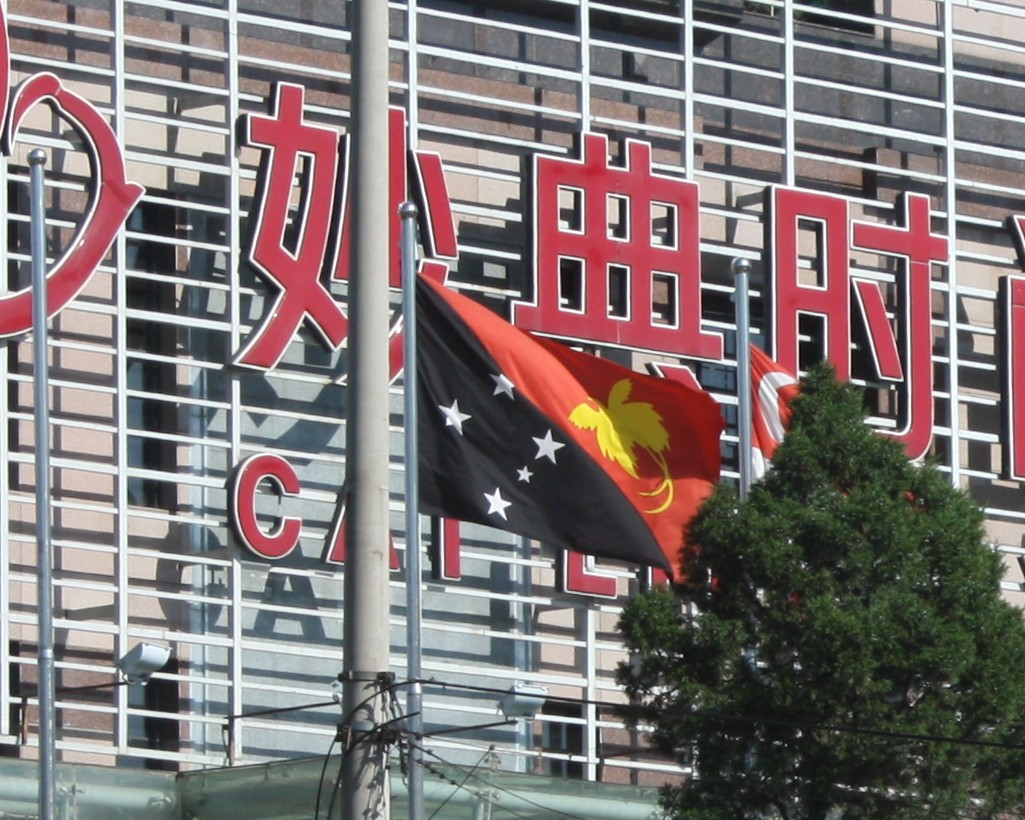
The flag in Beijing.

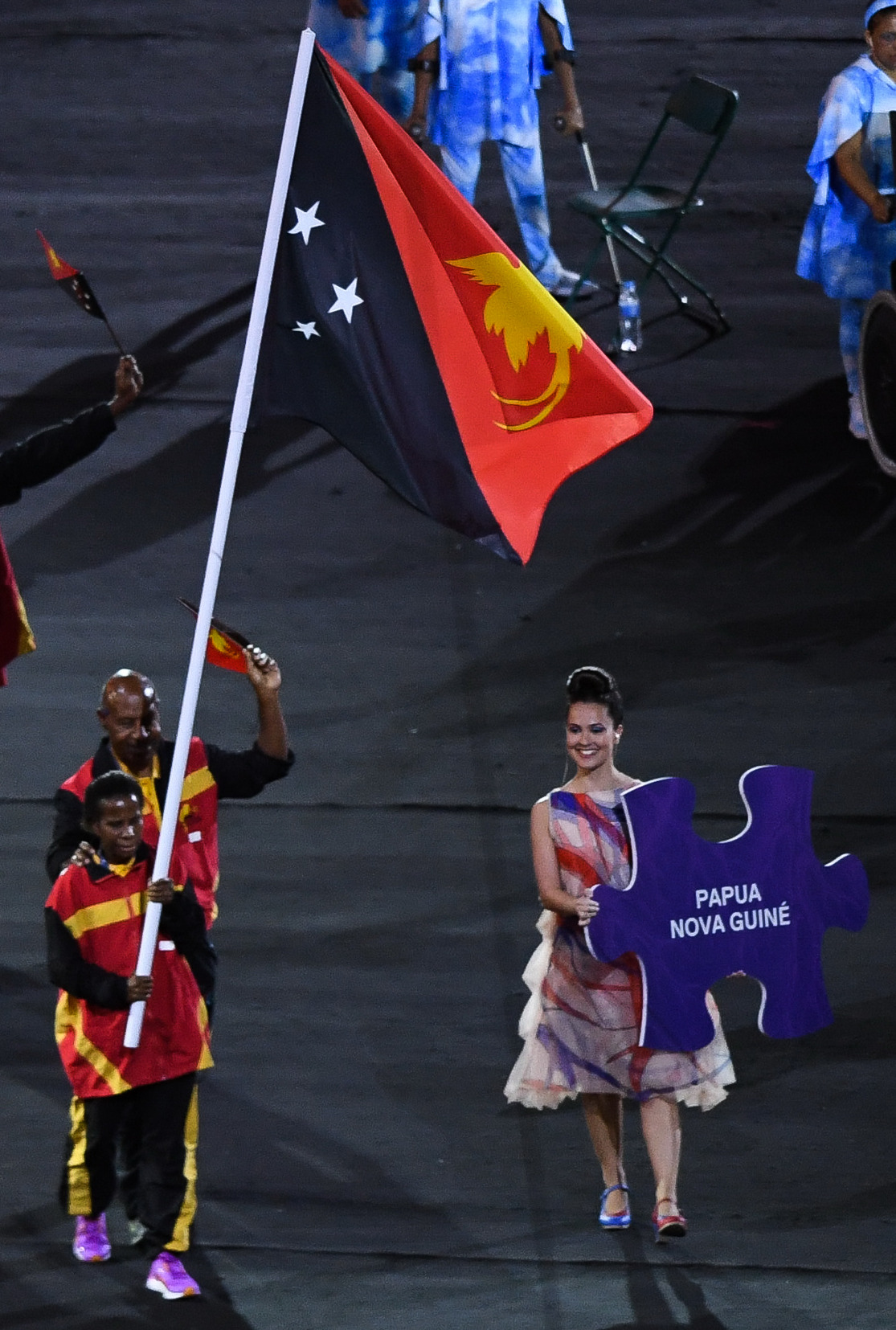
The flag paraded at the 2016 Paralympic Games.
