= January 2012 Fiji floods =

Flooding in Fiji from January to February 2012

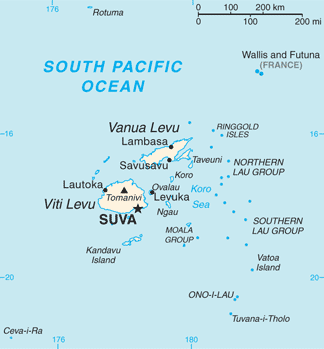
- Location of Fiji
- Date: 21 January – 12 February 2012
- Location: Viti Levu (especially in the west), Vanua Levu
- Deaths: At least 8 dead, over 4,500 displaced, over 178,000 affected
- Property damage: Over FJ$50 million (2012 FJ$)

A series of serious floods occurred in Fiji from 21 January to 12 February 2012, with heavy rains causing flooding to hit Vanua Levu and western Viti Levu. Nadi, Lautoka, Ba, Tavua and Rakiraki were the worst affected areas. The damage caused by this flood to all institutions including the government was FJ$50,047,344.00. Many infrastructure utilities and agricultural sectors were damaged.

== Background ==
Fiji is located in the South Pacific and has a tropical oceanic climate. Its two largest islands, Viti Levu and Vanua Levu, are over 1000 metres above sea level. Viti Levu's mountain range creates distinct wet and dry climatic zones on its windward and leeward sides. This geographical topography results in Fiji's rainy season lasting from November to April, with significant variations in rainfall between regions and most of the rainfall occurring in the form of heavy but brief localised showers. Also, rainfall in Fiji is highly variable and the seasonality of rainfall is strongly influenced by the movement of the South Pacific Convergence Zone (SPCZ) can also lead to extreme weather events. Common causes of flooding include tropical cyclones and monsoon troughs.

== Meteorological causes ==
2012 Fiji flood was mainly due to a trough of low pressure associated with Tropical Disturbance affecting the western part of Fiji, which combined with a slow moving convergence zone and transient ridges of high pressure resulted in the country experiencing heavy rainfall and flooding. Between 22 and 24 January, Fiji received more than 200mm of rain, with Vatukoula recording the highest rainfall of 863.4mm. This exceeded the usual rainfall of 373 mm on the western part of Viti Levu in Fiji's wettest January. The northwesterly winds on 24 January, pushed a layer of monsoon air over Fiji, resulting in torrential downpours in the western and northern parts of the island again. It extended from Vanuatu, Vanuatu to Fiji and then south-east to Tonga, Tonga, causing severe flooding of major rivers, streams and low-lying areas as well as the towns of Lakilaki, Ba and Nadi.

== Timeline ==
21 January	The heavy rain caused Fiji to activate the National Emergency Operation Centre (NEOC) in Suva and establish Divisional Emergency Operation Centres (DEOC) in the western regions.
24 January	With over 145mm of rainfall at Nadi Airport in the last 24 hours, widespread flooding in western and northern Fiji seems inevitable.
25 January	Continued rain. As the South Pacific Convergence Zone (SPCZ) is expected to stay over Fiji, the rain will ease off for a day or two from Thursday but will not disappear completely.; A massive landslide in the village of Tukuraki in Bayakitu killed four people in one house.
7 February	The prime minister briefed the meeting on the results of the damage assessment. The number of people affected by the floods is as high as 178,153.
12 February	End of the floods

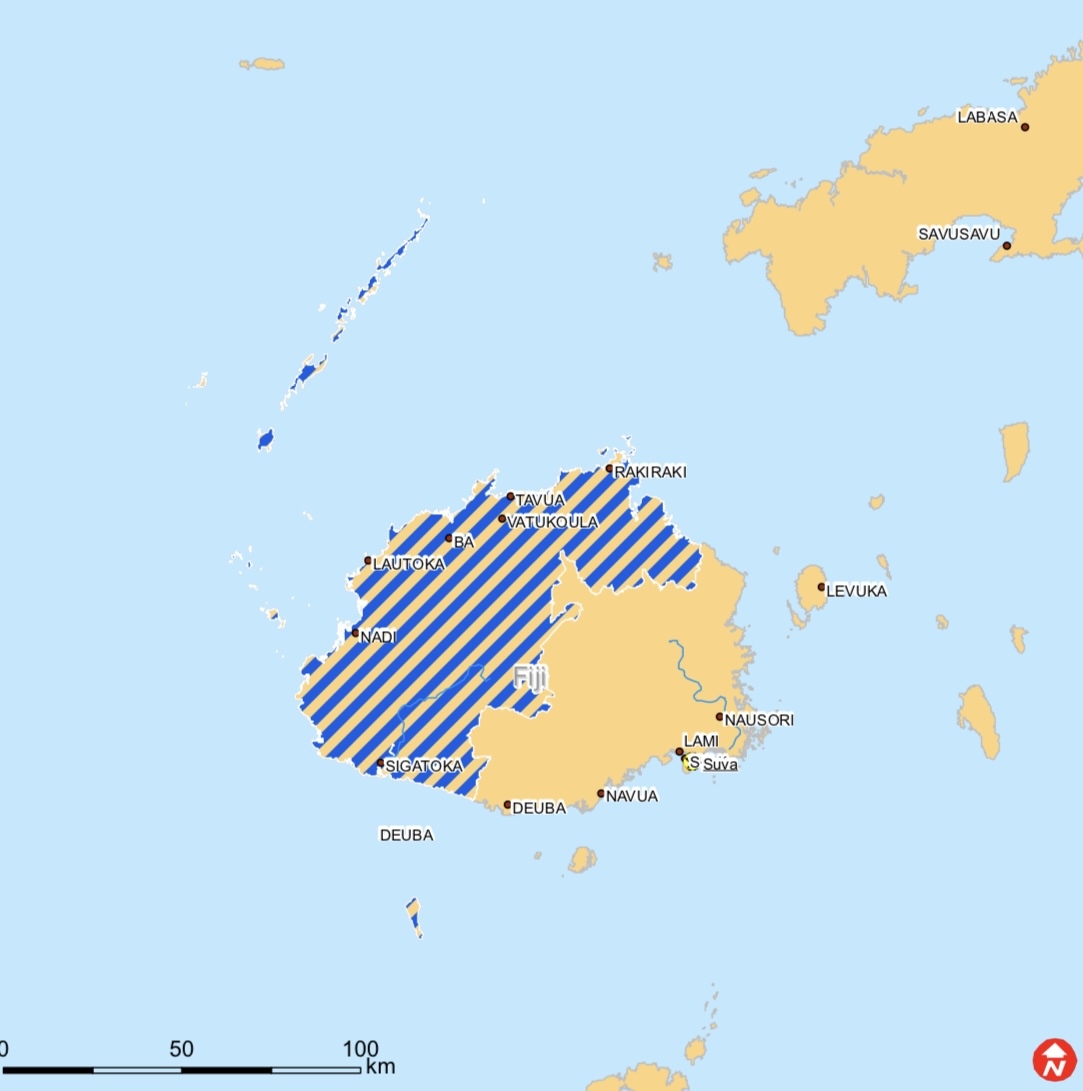
Area involved in January 2012 Fiji floods.

== Flood trend ==
The effects of the tropical depression continued. A month after the flood ended, another tropical depression caused heavy rainfall in the north and west of Viti Levu, leading to more flood. Heavy rains in the western part of the island lasted for a long time, causing flood of major rivers, creeks and low-lying areas.

== Geographical impact ==
The catastrophic flooding and subsequent landslides caused unprecedented damage to the western region of the main island of Vitu Levu and Vanua Levu. A state of emergency was declared as a consequence. Second and third cities, Nadi and Lautoka, Ba, Sigatoka and Rakiraki were declared to be in a state of disaster, by the Disaster Management Office.

=== Soil erosion ===
There are several significant geographical ways in which the floodwater has impacted the affected areas of Fiji. Primarily, excessive rainfall resulted in soil erosion which can alter the landscape and topographical representation, ultimately increasing the potential for further events of this nature. The degradation of soil and nutrient depletion due to the loss of topsoil by erosion can affect the environment and quality of food production. Over time it is possible for crop yields to be become much lower.

=== Sedimentation ===
Large volumes of alluvial sediment were displaced and washed downstream and deposited into coastal areas and floodplains. The net effect of sedimentation dumping in this manner can reroute the course of rivers, affecting water distribution and the suffocation of aquatic organisms, leaving a negative imprint on the ecosystems that have been previously degraded in the same way.

There are environmental issues that are also impacting the geographical landscape of Fiji in the aftermath of flooding events. Changes in the way the land is used, namely deforestation and degradation, and poor waste disposal practices.

=== Deforestation ===
Deforestation also causes soil erosion in forested areas close to water sources. Deforestation in Fiji continues to increase due to the need for wood for the rebuilding of homes and businesses. Further demands on land usage for cultivating commercial crops on marginal land, of which sugarcane and tobacco are examples, put high demands on the lands resources. The increase of urban developments among the communities also drives deforestation. Cropping on fragile soil without observation of conservation practices and the burning of grasslands further illustrate the effects of deforestation in perpetuating soil erosion and the potential for increased risk of flooding.

Large areas of the Fijian coastlands are made more susceptible to erosion by inappropriate disposal of animal waste, pesticides and fertilizers being dumped into international waters by farm run-offs during excessive rainfall.

== Physical impact ==
=== Tourism ===
The demand for luxury coastal accommodation on the western region of the Island, has seen exponential development of hotel resorts and urbanisation of the land to provide retail and entertainment and recreational facilities. Tourism in Fiji brought economic opportunity for business and employment with the addition of tourist expenditure. However the rapid evolution of the natural coastal landscape has established social and environmental changes for the local inhabitants. Hotel workers are commonly found to be the main bread-winners for many families, however, travel into the resorts from rural areas can reduce overall earnings and therefore the implications for poverty in rural areas is high. Over-development threatens the lives, livelihoods and homes of local people due to large-scale erosion and sediment displacement, increasing floods in the lowlands and coastal areas.

== Health impacts ==
=== Displacement and mortality ===
Official figures from the Fiji National Disaster Management Office state that 4,561 people were displaced due to the flood event in January 2012, with 74 evacuation centres set up to support them. Estimates of mortality attributed to immediate consequences of the flooding ranges between eight and eleven people. Indirect delayed mortality rates were much higher, for example at least 44 people were killed by diseases attributable to the flood waters.

Extreme ground saturation and flooding in January 2012 caused by tropical depression 06F, is said to have exacerbated the impact of further flooding in March 2012 which displaced a further 15,000 people and killed 4.

=== Disease outbreaks ===
In Fiji, where much of the population live in low-lying areas, heavy cyclonic rainfall is a high risk factor for transmission of water-borne diseases and diseases which spread through fecal-oral transmission. The flood conditions in January 2012 led to a rise in cases of water-borne diseases, including a serious Leptospirosis outbreak. During the January 2012 flood event and subsequent related flooding in March 2012, 576 Leptospirosis cases were recorded, with a case fatality rate of 7%. Issues with water, sanitation and hygiene (WaSH) in the aftermath of the flooding also caused a spike in reported cases of typhoid and diarrhoea.

=== Mental health and well-being ===
Those impacted by the floods reported lasting trauma due to the destruction caused by the flooding. This included loss of homes and possessions, displacement of people, and fragmentation of communities. Mental health and wellbeing support in the aftermath of the flood was limited. Limited warnings in advance of flooding was stated as a cause of concern and anxiety.

==== Gendered impacts on health and well-being ====
It is well documented that women experience poorer outcomes from natural disaster compared to men. In the aftermath of the January 2012 and the related flooding in March 2012, pre-existing issues with gender-based and domestic violence toward women and girls worsened. Three instances of serious sexual assault in flood evacuation shelters were documented, and subsequent training in recognising and preventing gender based violence was rolled out to emergency workers. Financial strain caused by the loss of livelihoods gave rise to sexual exploitation of women and children. Women reported experiencing unequal access to the humanitarian relief mobilised for those affected, also citing tensions between different communities and ethnic groups.

The different sanitation needs of women and girls can go overlooked during natural disasters. The Fiji Red Cross Society provided 'dignity kits' to support the menstrual hygiene of women and girls during the flooding event and aftermath.

==== Socio-economic factors impacting health and well-being ====
Many people on Viti Levu live in informal settlements on land susceptible to flooding, and in housing deemed inadequate to withstand heavy cyclonic activity or flood waters. Around 34% of people living in the areas affected at the time of the flooding were living below the poverty line. Poorer households in Fiji have less resilience to flood events and their aftermath. Those in low income brackets are less likely to be able to prepare for and recover from flood events. Furthermore, flood events can push households over the poverty line or further into poverty, exacerbating the effects of future events.

== Disaster Response ==
=== Coordination ===
Fiji has a well established disaster management structure. In January 2012, the National Disaster Management office (NDM) activated the National Emergency Operations Centre (NEOC) who thereafter led the disaster response. The NEOC were guided by an "operations order" (endorsed by the National Disaster Council (NCD)). which focused on critical elements including speed of response, effective communication and flexibility. On the NCD's advice on 25 January, the Fijian Cabinet declared a "State of Natural Disaster" for part of the Western Division for 15 days - later extended for another 10 days on 8 February.

District Emergency Operations Centers (EOCs) played a key role in providing on the ground support in areas of most need. The response faced challenges in common with other events in the region e.g. lack of flood warning, lack of communication channels and difficulty accessing data which can make it hard to assess damage and focus resources. Research shows that there remains an opportunity to increase resilience to floods and other natural disasters in the region.

==== Evacuation Centres (ECs) ====
To support those who were displaced, ECs were set up in priority locations. Community facilities were utilized, e.g. schools and churches. Over the period of the floods a total of 74 ECs were opened supporting over 4500 evacuees. These centres became critical hubs for the provision of essential supplies, shelter, and also for the dissemination of educational information to manage risks. Challenges included potential disruption to education when schools were used as ECs, a common challenge in disaster response as well as lack of sanitation and water supplies at the centres.

=== The Prime Minister's Flood Relief Appeal – launched 26 January 2012 ===
On 26 January, then Prime Minister Frank Bainimarama launched his "Flood Relief Appeal". Administered by the BSP Financial Group Limited, the Fund facilitated donations from both domestic and international branches. The Prime Minister made a public appeal encouraging multi sectoral support and later the Cabinet approved a submission made by the PM to allow a 200% tax deduction for cash donations exceeding FJ$1000 (running 27 January to 31 March 2012). By early March 2012, it was estimated that the Fund stood at nearly FJ$2million.

During and after the floods, Fiji was supported by a range of stakeholders, e.g. national governments, private business, religious groups and volunteer organizations. Notable support came from the Australian government who supported the region during and for some time after the event to the value of almost FJ$1.8 m Organizations provided both financial support and essentials supplies, with many donors filtering their contributions via the Fijian Red Cross.

=== The role of the International Federation of Red Cross and Red Cross Societies (IFRC) ===
The IFRC and local Red Cross were critical in disaster response receiving dynamic updates from the NDMO . Their activity covered risk and damage assessment, provision of essentials supplies as well as medical support for minor injuries. The Red Cross had prepositioned emergency supplies and worked to get these to priority locations.

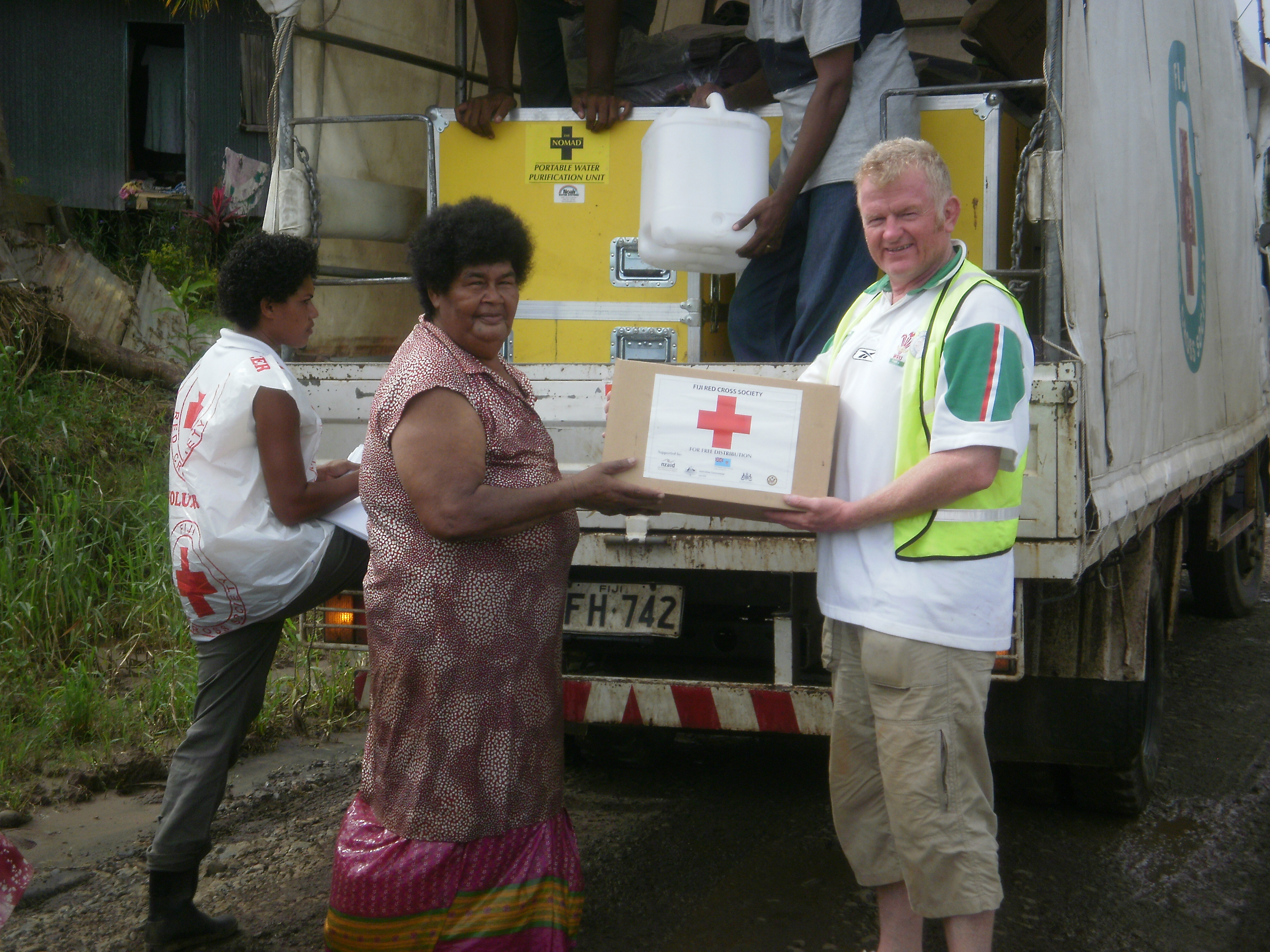
January 2012 relief efforts - Fiji Red Cross

== Lessons Learned ==
Brown pointed out that due to climate change, natural disasters may become more frequent, resulting in more losses, especially for developing countries like Fiji, which can be fatal.

=== Monitoring capability ===
Many quantitative flood monitoring techniques and indicators have been used recently, such as the Standardized Precipitation Index and the Flood Index. The Flood Index (I_{F}) is a more innovative and accurate technical indicator that can determine past flood events' duration, severity, and intensity and provide correct guidance for future flood decision-making. However, it is not widely used by monitoring departments at this stage and needs further promotion. More effective and accurate flood quantification and monitoring technologies urgently need to be developed, and disaster prediction requires more robust academic support for flood-prone areas such as Fiji.

At the same time, observers responsible for river basins and floods need to strengthen their understanding and prevention of floods through stakeholder feedback.

=== Infrastructure system strengthening ===
During the 23/01-27/01 floods in Fiji, mountain landslides and widespread flooding affected nearly 25000 people, disrupted water and electricity supply, and extensively damaged infrastructure. Strengthening infrastructure systems, flood protection measures, and rapid recovery capabilities are areas that Fiji needs to improve in the future. It is essential to have a second system or disaster response plan, especially in areas prone to disasters.

At the same time, the medical system needs to buffer the direct harm caused by floods and prevent diseases after the flood period. In January and March 2012, consecutive tropical depressions caused two extreme flooding events in western Fiji, leading to the largest outbreak of leptospirosis in the Pacific region, with 44 deaths and hundreds of confirmed cases. Post-disaster disease prevention needs more attention, and the medical system needs strengthening.

=== Vulnerability protection ===
In the 24 January 2012 flood, two farmers drowned while rescuing livestock. The flood caused irreparable damage to many crops and caused direct property damage to farmers. In flood events, watershed communities are the most vulnerable group, relying on a range of resources and income from the watershed, which are at risk of environmental changes such as floods. To reduce the loss of life, these vulnerable groups need to have some particular protection policies, and Fiji's domestic and international attention needs to be raised.

=== Climate response ===
The intensification of equatorial warming in the Pacific may lead to more frequent extreme events in Pacific island countries affected by events in the South Pacific Convergence Zone. Data from floods in 2012 estimated that under current climate change conditions, future floods in Fiji will be more frequent and severe, and the resulting losses will increase with the degree of climate change. Fiji must pay attention to climate conditions and be more sensitive in preventing and controlling severe rainfall and floods while working with other countries to make practical measures for global warming.

== See also ==
- 2011-12 South Pacific cyclone season
