= Coat of arms of Tuvalu =

- Armiger: Tuvalu
- Adopted: 3 December 1976
- Shield: Per fess Azure and Or in chief upon Grass issuant a representation of an Ellice Maneapa or meeting house all proper and in base four Barrulets wavy Azure a Brodure Or charged with Banana Leaves and Mitre Sea Shells placed alternately proper together
- Motto: Tuvalu mo te Atua ("Tuvalu is for God")

The coat of arms of Tuvalu is the heraldic symbol representing the sovereign island country of Tuvalu in the southern Pacific Ocean. It is a shield with a golden border decorated with eight mitre shells and eight banana leaves. The shield depicts a maneapa beneath a blue sky on green ground. Below the ground are eight wavy bars alternating between gold and blue.

The College of Arms granted Tuvalu the coat of arms on 3 December 1976, when it was a British colony. On 13 November 1981, the Tuvalu Coat of Arms Act came into effect, creating legal restrictions on the usage of the coat of arms. The coat of arms was previously featured on the flag of Tuvalu from 1 October 1995 to 11 April 1997, as well as on the colonial Blue Ensign from 3 December 1976 to 1 October 1978.

== Description ==
The official description of the coat of arms by the College of Arms is as follows:

Per fess Azure and Or in chief upon Grass issuant a representation of an Ellice Maneapa or meeting house all proper and in base four Barrulets wavy Azure a Brodure Or charged with Banana Leaves and Mitre Sea Shells placed alternately proper together with the Motto: TUVALU MO TE ATUA.

The motto is in the Tuvaluan language and can be translated as "Tuvalu is for God".

== Prohibition of use ==
The Tuvalu Coat of Arms Act (1981, revised 2022) prohibits personal and commercial uses of the coat of arms and designs similar to it. Individuals found guilty of violating this restriction are subject to a fine of 1,000 Tuvaluan dollars and the seizure of offending materials. The prime minister of Tuvalu may make exceptions to this rule on an ad hoc basis.

== History ==
Tuvalu was, as the Ellice Islands, a constituent part of the British protectorate and then colony of the Gilbert and Ellice Islands from 1892 to 1975. The Gilbert and Ellice Islands were granted a coat of arms in 1937, consisting of a shield with a red field charged with a yellow sun and yellow frigatebird above six wavy bars alternating between white and blue, representing the Pacific Ocean. The coat of arms later became the basis of the flag of Kiribati (the Gilbert Islands).

The Ellice Islands separated from the Gilbert Islands and became the Colony of Tuvalu on 1 October 1975. Tuvalu subsequently received a coat of arms from the College of Arms on 3 December 1976, and it has remained the coat of arms of Tuvalu since. The Tuvalu Coat of Arms Act was enacted on 13 November 1981 to regulate the use of the coat of arms.

The coat of arms was featured on the colonial Blue Ensign from 3 December 1976 to 1 October 1978, and the flag of Tuvalu from 1 October 1995 to 11 April 1997.

Coat of arms of the Gilbert and Ellice Islands (1937–1975)

Flag of the Colony of Tuvalu (3 December 1976 – 1 October 1978)

Flag of Tuvalu (1 October 1995 – 11 April 1997)
