= Hal Holman =

Hal Holman OL OAM
- Born: 29 August 1922; Australia
- Died: 20 June 2016 (aged 93)
- Education: Sydney High School; Newington College; National Art School
- Occupations: Sculptor, artist and designer
- Website: halholman.com.au/halholman.htm

Haldane Sinclair "Hal" Holman (29 August 1922 – 20 June 2016) was an Australian sculptor, artist, and designer.

== Early life ==
Holman was born in Sydney and attended Sydney High School and Newington College (1932). During World War II he served as a commando in the New Guinea campaign. He operated behind Japanese lines on the mainland and was attached to the United States Marine Corps who landed in Rabaul. After demobilisation Holman was awarded a Diploma of Art at East Sydney Technical College, now known as the National Art School.

== Art career ==
Upon graduation, Holman went to India and worked for three years as an art director for the Advertising Corporation of India. After returning to Australia he was a designer in the film industry and produced set designs and made thirteen animated short films. Holman later moved to Port Moresby and was appointed senior artist for the Government of Papua New Guinea. In that role he designed the Emblem of Papua New Guinea and was involved in the design of the National Flag, which was developed into its final design by schoolgirl Susan Karike. He also designed the uniforms of the PNG Constabulary Band and created a one-tonne metal sculpture of the National Crest for the Supreme Court building.

== Honours ==
- Officer of Logohu for distinguished service to Papua New Guinea
- Medal of the Order of Australia for service to the arts as a designer and sculptor

== Gallery ==
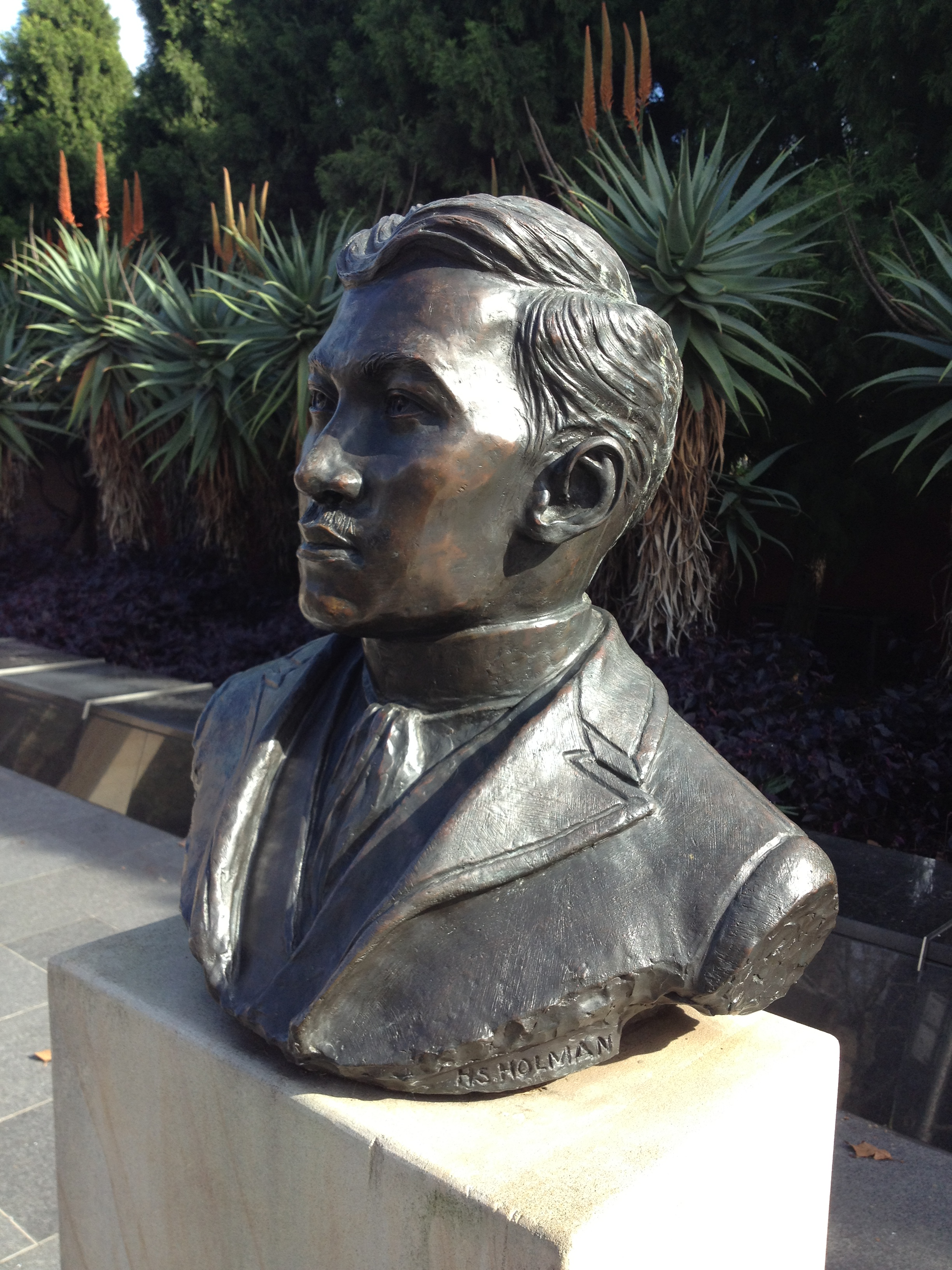
Bust of José Rizal by Holman

Emblem of Papua New Guinea designed by Holman

Holman's design for the flag of Papua New Guinea

Susan Karike's final flag design utilising aspects of Holman's work.
