= March 2012 Fiji floods =

In March 2012, Fiji was hit by serious flooding and landslides caused by Tropical Depression 17F and tropical cyclone Daphne. At least 4 people were killed, whilst 15,000 people were displaced into around 180 temporary shelters. Water supplies and electricity were cut off.

The floods were exacerbated by a flood event earlier in the year (January 2012 Fiji floods) which caused widespread ground saturation and damage to infrastructure.
