= List of Samoan flags =

The following is a list of flags used in both Samoa and American Samoa. For more information about the national flag and the territory flag, please see Flag of Samoa and Flag of American Samoa.

== National flag ==
Flag	Date	Use	Description
	1962–present	Flag of Samoa	A red field with the blue rectangle on the upper hoist-side quadrant bearing the Southern Cross of four white larger five-pointed stars and a smaller star in the center.

== Territory flag ==
Flag	Date	Use	Description
	1960–present	Flag of American Samoa	A red-edged white triangle pointing towards the hoist charged with a bald eagle clutching a war club and a fly-whisk. The upper and lower triangles are dark blue.

== Historical flags ==
Flag	Date	Use	Description
	1845–1858	Flag of the Tuʻi Tonga Empire in Samoa	A white field with two red crosses, two blue crosses and a blue "M" and a red "A" in the center.
	1858–1861	Flag of the Kingdom of Samoa	A red field with a white crescent and a five-pointed star.
	1872–1873	Flag of the Kingdom of Samoa	A nine-striped field (five blue stripes and four white stripes) and a red canton with two crescent moons and four five-pointed stars.
	1873–1875	Flag of the Kingdom of Samoa	A red field with a white five-pointed star on the blue canton.
	1875–1879	Flag of the Kingdom of Samoa	A seven-striped field (four red stripes and three white stripes) and a five-pointed star on the blue canton, similar to the flag of Liberia.
	1879–1886; 1889–1900	Flag of the Kingdom of Samoa	A red field with centred white cross and a five-pointed star in the canton.
	1886–1887	Flag of the Kingdom of Samoa	A red field with centred black cross and a white five-pointed star in the canton.
	1887–1889	Flag of the Kingdom of Samoa	A white field with centred black cross and a red canton with a white five-pointed star.
	1900–1908	Flag of the United States	Thirteen horizontal stripes alternating red and white; in a blue canton, 45 white stars in alternating horizontal rows of 8 and 7 stars.
	1900–1914	Flag of the German Empire	A tricolour made of three equal horizontal bands coloured black (top), white, and red (bottom).
	1900–1914	Colonial flag of the German Empire	A tricolour made of three equal horizontal bands coloured black (top), white, and red (bottom) with the Reichsadler in the center.
	1908–1912	Flag of the United States	Thirteen horizontal stripes alternating red and white; in a blue canton, 46 white stars in horizontal rows of 8 or 7 stars.
	1912–1959	Flag of the United States	Thirteen horizontal stripes alternating red and white; in a blue canton, 48 white stars arranged in 6 horizontal rows of 8 stars.
	1914	Proposed flag of German Samoa	A tricolour made of three equal horizontal bands coloured black (top), white, and red (bottom) with the emblem of Samoa in the center.
	1914–1962	Flag of the United Kingdom	A superimposition of the flags of England and Scotland, with the Saint Patrick's Saltire (representing Ireland).
	1914–1962	Flag of New Zealand	A Blue Ensign defaced with four red stars with white borders in the fly, representing the constellation of Crux, the Southern Cross.
	1920–1948	Flag of the Western Samoa Trust Territory	A defaced Blue Ensign with the badge of Samoa.
	1948–1949	Flag of the Western Samoa Trust Territory	A red field with a blue rectangle on the upper hoist-side quadrant bearing the Southern Cross of four white larger five-pointed stars.
	1949–1962	Flag of the Western Samoa Trust Territory	A red field with a blue rectangle on the upper hoist-side quadrant bearing the Southern Cross of four white larger five-pointed stars and a smaller star in the center.
	1959–1960	Flag of the United States	Thirteen horizontal stripes alternating red and white; in a blue canton, 49 white stars arranged in staggered horizontal rows of 7 stars.

== See also ==
- Flag of Samoa
- Coat of arms of Samoa
