= Flag of Papua New Guinea =

Papua New Guinea
- Use: National flag, civil and state ensign
- Proportion: 3:4
- Adopted: 1 July 1971; 55 years ago
- Design: Divided diagonally from the upper hoist-side corner to the lower fly-side corner: the upper triangle is red with the soaring Raggiana bird-of-paradise and the lower triangle is black with the Southern Cross of four white larger five-pointed stars and the smaller star.
- Designed by: Susan Karike Huhume; Hal Holman
- Naval Ensign
- Use: Naval ensign
- Proportion: 3:4
- Design: A white flag with the national flag of Papua New Guinea in the canton

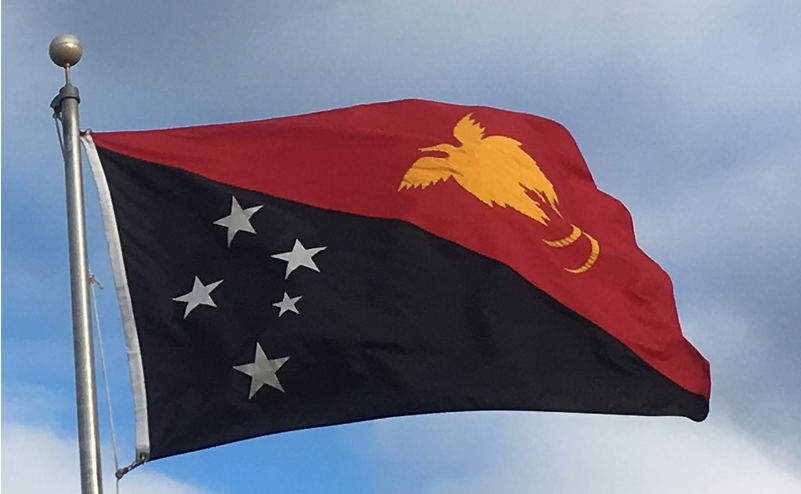
PNG flag flying

The flag of Papua New Guinea (Note: Tok Pisin: plak bilong Papua Niugini) was adopted on 1 July 1971. In the hoist, it depicts the Southern Cross; in the fly, a Raggiana bird-of-paradise is silhouetted.

Red and black have long been traditional colours of many Papua New Guinean tribes. Black-white-red was the colour of the German Empire flag, which had colonised New Guinea prior to 1918. The bird-of-paradise is also found on the national coat-of-arms. The Southern Cross is a common symbol on the flags of countries in the Southern Hemisphere, where the constellation can be seen.

Prior to independence, the Australian administration proposed a vertical tricolour flag with blue, yellow and green bands, along with the bird-of-paradise and southern cross, designed by Hal Holman. The blue was said to represent the sea and islands of New Guinea, the Southern Cross was a guide for the traveling peoples, the gold represented the coastlines, mineral wealth, and unity, and the green represented the forested highlands and mainland, with the Bird of Paradise representing the unification under one nation. It had a mainly negative reception, due to its appearance as that of a "mechanically contrived outcome", thus after a nationwide design competition in early 1971, a winning redesign by 15-year old schoolgirl Susan Karike was chosen instead.

== Design ==
The design of the Papuan flag is divided in half diagonally from the top left (upper hoist) corner to the bottom right (lower fly) corner. The upper triangle is red with a Raggiana bird-of-paradise in gold yellow and the lower triangle is black with five white stars forming the shape of the Southern Cross. Red, black and yellow are traditionally used as colours to represent Papua New Guinea, and black, white, and red were the colours used in the flag of the German Empire, which colonised Papua New Guinea in the 19th century. The bird of paradise is a symbol of tribal culture in Papua New Guinea, and its soaring position represents the nation's emergence. The Southern Cross, meanwhile, signifies their relationship with other nearby countries in the southern hemisphere, and the flags of Australia and New Zealand feature the cross as well.

=== Specification ===
According to the "Rules Respecting the Use of the National Flag and the National Emblem", the flag should be displayed as follows:

(a) On a staff–the Southern Cross to be in the position nearest the staff and furthest from the peak. When carried the flag should be aloft and free.

(b) On a halyard–the Bird of Paradise to be uppermost, and the flag hoisted as closely as possible to the block with the halyard taut.

(c) Flat against a wall–the Bird of Paradise to be in the upper right-hand corner as viewed by a person looking towards the wall.

(d) Suspended vertically in the middle of a street–the Bird of Paradise should be towards the south in an east-west street, and towards the west in a north-south street, thus being on the left of a person facing east or south respectively.

(e) When used to cover a casket at funerals a new flag should be used (if possible), the Southern Cross being over the right breast of the deceased. The flag should be removed before the casket is lowered into the ground.

It must be proportioned in the ratio 3:4. (Note: "The National Flag must always be in the proportion 4 in the fly to 3 in the hoist." - that is, the length is 4/3rds of the height, normally expressed as 3:4 proportion.) For Government use, 4 feet x 3 feet, 5 feet x 3 feet 9 inches and 10 feet x 7 feet 6 inches are the stated normal sizes for the flag to be. When it is used as a pennant, as on a car, the usual size is 10 inches x 7½ inches. The National Identity Act of 1971 laid out fines and penalties for desecration of the flag. The flag is displayed upside-down only as a signal of distress, per the flag code. When it is hoisted or lowered or when it is carried in a parade or review, all persons present should face the flag, men should remove their hats and all should remain silent; persons in uniform should salute.

=== Colours ===
The colours used on the flag are as follows:

Scheme	Black	Red	White	Gold
Pantone (Paper)	Black	186 C	White	116 C
Web colours	#000000	#C8102E	#FFFFFF	#FFCD00
RGB	0, 0, 0	200, 16, 46	255, 255, 255	255, 205, 0
CMYK	0%, 0%, 0%, 100%	0%, 92%, 77%, 22%	0%, 0%, 0%, 0%	0%, 20%, 100%, 0%

== History ==
Proposed coat of arms of German New Guinea by the colonial government.

Germany began occupying parts of the country in the late 19th century, and ruled over it until WWI, when Australia occupied their territory (German New Guinea). Meanwhile, Britain had already occupied the southern part of the country, and transferred control of their area to the Commonwealth of Australia, putting both the Territory of Papua and the Territory of New Guinea under separate authorities both under Australia. The two territories were unified after WWII to form the Australian Territory of Papua and New Guinea. The various governments over the land had had no official locally significant symbols, although German New Guinea proposed a coat-of-arms that featured a bird of paradise, which was never adopted because of Germany’s involvement in World War I. In 1962 a local flag also incorporated a bird-of-paradise. That design was used by Papua New Guinea at sports events, was green with a bird in the top-left (upper hoist). Also proposed was a blue yellow and green tricolour, with the southern cross and a bird in white, though this was rejected by the people. The design of the flag was put to a nationwide competition, and the design that ended up seeing the most widespread support was the one by Susan Karike, whose flag had the similar features of the bird of paradise and the southern cross, but in a more unusual diagonal split with the colours red, black and yellow used instead. The flag was made official by the parliament on March 11, 1971, and extended to naval use upon the country's independence on September 16, 1975.

== Government flags ==
Flag of the governor-general of Papua New Guinea

== Historical flags of Papua New Guinea ==
Flag of the German Imperial Colonial Office, 1884–1914

Proposed flag of German New Guinea in 1914, but never implemented

Flag of the Territory of Papua, 1906–1971

Flag of the Territory of New Guinea, 1921–1971

Flag of Australia in the Territory of Papua and New Guinea, 1949–1971

Flag used by the Territory of Papua and New Guinea at sports events, 1965–1970

Hal Holman's proposed flag for Territory of Papua and New Guinea, 1970–1971

Susan Karike's flag of the Territory of Papua and New Guinea, 1971–1975, and of Papua New Guinea, 1975–present

== See also ==
- List of Papua New Guinean flags
- Flags depicting the Southern Cross
