= Fiji Red Cross Society =

Humanitarian and relief organisation

Flag of the Fiji Red Cross Society

The Fiji Red Cross Society is a humanitarian organisation which currently has 16 branches across Fiji. Originally founded in 1952 as a branch of the British Red Cross, it gained status as a stand-alone national red cross society in 1972. In 1973 it became the 118th member of the International Red Cross and Red Crescent Movement. It provides emergency relief in the aftermath of conflict and natural disaster, and contributes to developing resilience in communities more at risk from natural disaster.
