= Flag of Fiji =

Republic of Fiji
- Use: National flag
- Proportion: 1:2
- Adopted: 10 October 1970; 56 years ago
- Design: A Cyan Ensign with the shield from the national coat of arms centred in the fly half.
- Designed by: Tessa Mackenzie
- Use: Civil ensign
- Proportion: 1:2
- Adopted: 1970
- Design: A Red Ensign with the shield from the national coat of arms centred in the fly half.
- Use: State ensign
- Proportion: 1:2
- Adopted: 1970
- Design: A Blue Ensign with the shield from the national coat of arms centred in the fly half.
- Use: Naval ensign
- Proportion: 1:2
- Adopted: 1970
- Design: A White Ensign with the national coat of arms centred in the fly half.
- Use: Civil air ensign
- Proportion: 1:2
- Adopted: 1970
- Design: A dark blue cross outlined in white on a light blue field with the Union Jack in the canton and the shield from the Fijian coat of arms superimposed over the right arm of the cross.
- Use: Standard of the president of Fiji
- Proportion: 2:3
- Adopted: c.1987
- Design: A dark blue field featuring the outline of the full coat of arms of Fiji in golden-yellow and a traditional knot and whale's tooth beneath it.

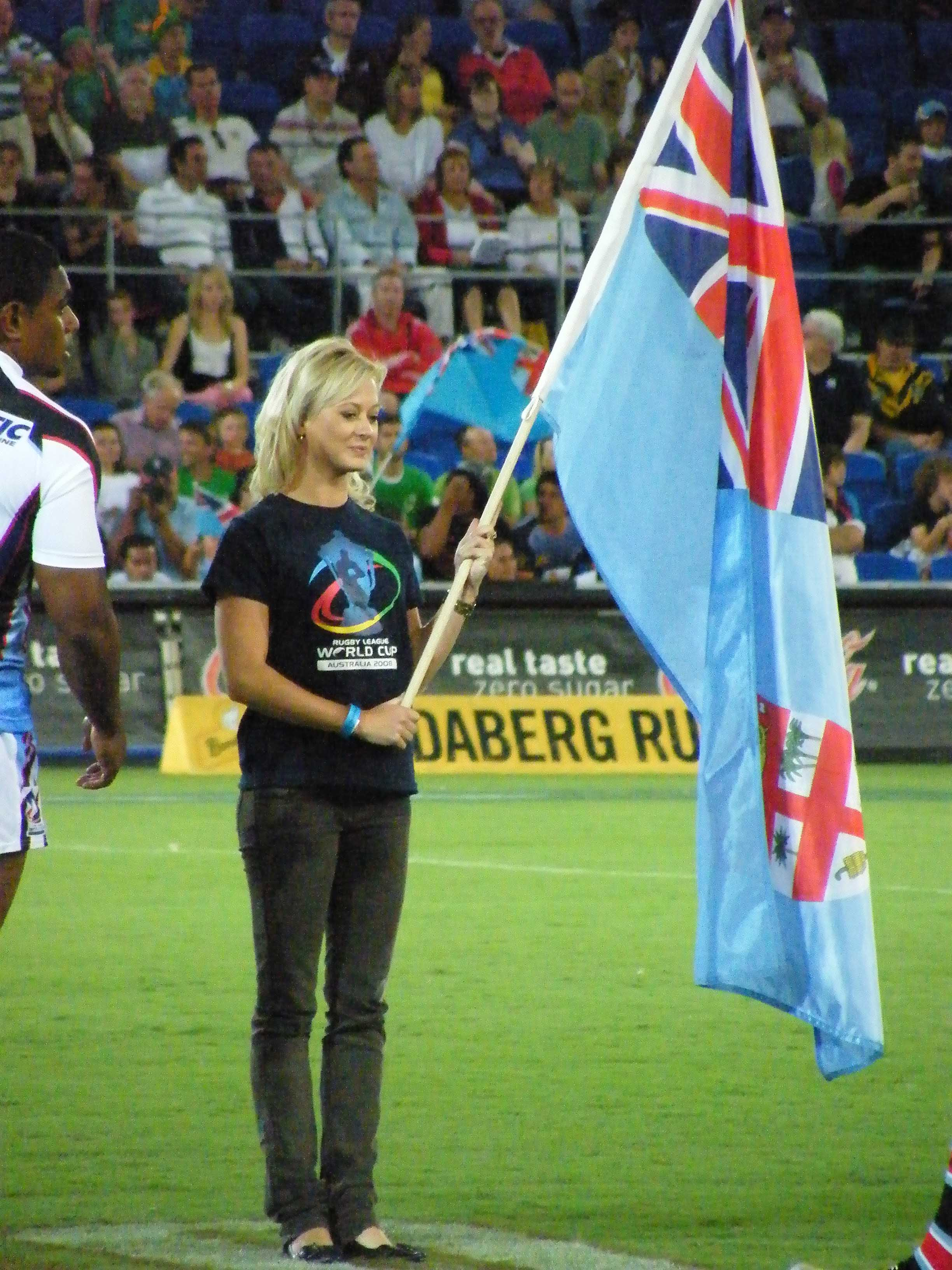
Fiji flag-bearer at the 2008 Rugby League World Cup

The national flag of Fiji was adopted on 10 October 1970. The state arms have been slightly modified but the flag has remained the same as during Fiji's colonial period. It is a defaced cyan "Blue Ensign" (the actual Blue Ensign version of the flag is the government ensign), with the shield from the national coat of arms. It has remained unchanged since Fiji was declared a republic in 1987, despite calls from some politicians for changes.

A plan to change the flag, announced by Prime Minister Frank Bainimarama in 2013, was abandoned in August 2016.

== Design ==
Constituent parts of the flag of Fiji

Flags forming the Union Jack

Arms of Fiji

The flag's bright blue background symbolises the Pacific Ocean, which plays an important part in the lives of the islanders, both in terms of the fishing industry, and the huge tourist trade. The Union Jack reflects the country's links with the United Kingdom. The shield is derived from the country's coat of arms, which was granted by royal warrant in 1908. It is a white shield with a red cross and a red chief (upper third of a shield). The images depicted on the shield represent agricultural activities on the islands, and the historical associations with the United Kingdom. At the top of the shield, a British lion holds a cocoa pod between its paws. The first quarter is sugar cane, the second quarter is a coconut palm, the third quarter is a dove of peace, and the fourth quarter is a bunch of bananas.

The flag is very similar to the colonial ensign used prior to independence, the main differences being the latter used a darker shade of blue and displayed the entire Fijian coat of arms as opposed to just the shield. While some reformists have called for the removal of the Union Flag, seeing it a British colonial emblem, others support its retention for the sake of historical continuity. The flags of five other independent countries (Australia, Cook Islands, New Zealand, Niue, and Tuvalu) retain the Union Flag in their national flags. But of these, only Fiji is a republic. The Union Flag also remains on the flag of Hawaii, a U.S. state since 1959.

Some influential Fijians have called for the restoration of the full coat of arms to the flag. On 30 November 2005, Fiji's Great Council of Chiefs called for the two warrior figures, who guard the shield on the coat of arms, to be placed on the flag, along with a miniature canoe and the national motto, Rerevaka na kalou ka doka na tui ("Fear God and honour the Queen" (Note: The motto "Fear God. Honour the king." was taken from the New Testament (1 Peter 2:17).)) – symbols that were featured on the original flag of the Kingdom of Viti, the first unified Fijian state created under the leadership of Seru Epenisa Cakobau in 1871.

"The coat of arms is very significant because it has the word of God, then it has the two warriors and the Fijian canoe also. I think that the council members prefer that the full coat of arms be included in the Fiji flag," said Asesela Sadole, General Secretary of the Great Council of Chiefs.

Prior to ceding the country to British rule in 1874, the government of Fiji adopted a national flag featuring blue and white vertical stripes, with in the centre a red shield depicting a white dove. This flag ceased to be used when the colonial era began and Fiji relinquished its independence. Fiji was a British colony from 1874 to 1970.

== Proposal for a new flag ==
In his New Year's Day address in 2013, Prime Minister Frank Bainimarama announced that the flag would soon be changed so as "to reflect a sense of national renewal, to reinforce a new Fijian identity and a new confidence in being Fijian on the global stage". The change in the flag would accompany the adoption of a new Constitution, intended by Fiji's military leader (who came to power in a coup in December 2006) to establish a "one person, one vote", non-racial and secular democracy under military oversight. The country, a republic, had removed Queen Elizabeth II from its currency a few weeks earlier.

On 3 February 2015, Bainimarama confirmed that the flag of Fiji would be replaced. He announced that a national competition to design the new flag would be held, with the aim of hoisting this flag on 11 October 2015, the 45th anniversary of independence.

During the competition, over 2,000 designs were submitted, before a final shortlist of 23 was selected by Fiji's National Flag Committee on 9 June 2015. It was intended to submit these designs to the Cabinet for consideration on 30 June 2015, following a brief public feedback period. However, on 30 June, Bainimarama announced that this feedback period was to be extended to 31 December 2015, saying, "(People) want more time to consider what form the new flag should take... By extending the deadline, there is now ample opportunity for Fijians of all ages and backgrounds to further contribute and consider what symbols most appropriately represent our wonderful nation."

On 24 December 2015, the Fijian government announced that it had again put off a decision on the country's new flag via delaying the next stage by another two months to the end of February 2016. In a statement, the government said that it had now received new submissions since it released 23 designs earlier in 2015, and that it was still seeking more. Furthermore, it was announced that five designs would be chosen through the Prime Minister's Office in March 2016, with the public then having three months to select one. The government also said it expected to announce the new flag on 1 July 2016 or at a later date, and that it planned to raise the new flag on Constitution Day, 7 September 2017 (a new public holiday celebrating the 2013 Constitution of Fiji).

However, on 17 August 2016, Bainimarama publicly announced that the government was abandoning plans to change the flag. He read out a statement saying: "While I remain convinced personally that we need to replace some of the flag's colonial symbols with a genuinely indigenous expression of our present and our future, it has been apparent to the Government since February that the flag should not be changed for the foreseeable future". The flag's popularity had been boosted by the country winning its first ever Olympic gold medal under its banner in the 2016 Summer Olympics. The decision to retain the current flag was welcomed by opposition parties.

== Other flags of Fiji ==
Presidential flag
Flag	Date	Use	Description
	c.1987–present	Standard of the president of Fiji	A dark blue field featuring the outline of the full coat of arms of Fiji in golden-yellow and a traditional knot and whale's tooth beneath it.

Ensigns
Flag	Date	Use	Description
	1970–present	Civil ensign of Fiji	A Red Ensign with the Union Jack in the canton and the shield from the Fijian coat of arms in the fly.
	1970–present	Government ensign of Fiji	A Blue Ensign with the Union Jack in the canton and the shield from the Fijian coat of arms in the fly.
	1970–present	Naval ensign of Fiji	A White Ensign with the Union Jack in the canton and the shield from the Fijian coat of arms in the fly.
	1970–present	Civil air ensign of Fiji	A dark blue cross outlined in white on a light blue field with the Union Jack in the canton and the shield from the Fijian coat of arms in the fly, superimposed over the arm of the cross.
	1987–present	Customs ensign of Fiji	A blue British ensign featuring the shield from the Fijian coat of arms with the word "CUSTOMS" beneath it in the fly.

Miscellaneous
Flag	Date	Use	Description
		Flag of the Fiji Red Cross Society	A white flag defaced in the centre with a red cross surrounded by a light blue ring bearing the name "FIJI RED CROSS SOCIETY" in white.

== Historical ==
=== Pre-colonial era ===
Flag	Date	Use	Description
	1865–1867	Flag of the Confederacy of Independent Kingdoms of Fiji	A white eight-pointed star on a dark blue field.
	1867–1869	Flag of the Kingdom of Bau	A horizontal tricolour of white, blue, and red, with a golden sunburst in the centre and a crown in the canton. Similar to the Russian flag.
	1869–1871	Flag of the Confederation of Lau	A horizontal bicolour of white and red with a red cross in the canton. Similar to the Polish flag.
	1871–1874	Flag of the Kingdom of Fiji	A vertical bicolour of white and light blue with a white dove holding an olive branch on a red shield surmounted by a crown.

=== Colonial era ===
Flag	Date	Use	Description
	1924–1970	Flag of the Colony of Fiji	A blue British ensign with the full Fijian coat of arms in the fly.
	1908–1924	Flag of the Colony of Fiji	A blue British ensign with the full Fijian coat of arms on a white disc in the fly.
	1903–1908	Flag of the Colony of Fiji	A blue British ensign with a white disc in the fly displaying a Tudor Crown surmounted by a crowned lion with the word "FIJI" beneath it.
	1883–1903	Flag of the Colony of Fiji	A blue British ensign with a white disc in the fly displaying a Saint Edward's Crown surmounted by a crowned lion with the word "FIJI" beneath it.
	1877–1883	Flag of the Colony of Fiji	A blue British ensign with a white disc in the fly containing a badge of foliage and crossed war-clubs with a superimposed shield bearing a mermaid looking at herself in a hand mirror. The badge is based on what was then the seal of the Supreme Court of Fiji.
	1874–1877	Flag of the Colony of Fiji	The British Union Flag, first raised on 10 October 1874 to mark Fiji's cession to the United Kingdom, and served for three years as Fiji's sole official flag.

Royal flags
Flag	Date	Use	Description
	1871–1874	Royal standard of Fiji	A white field bearing a white dove on a red shield surmounted by a crown. Below the shield is a scroll bearing the country's motto; REREVAKA NA KALOU KA DOKA NA TUI (Fear God and honour the King).
	1869–1871	Personal flag of the king of Lau	A vertical bicolour of red and white with a white cross in the canton.

Viceregal flags
Flag	Date	Use	Description
	1970–1987	Flag of the governor-general of Fiji	A dark blue field featuring a St. Edward's Crown surmounted by a crowned lion, over the word "FIJI" on a whale's tooth.
	1908–1970	Flag of the governor of Fiji	A Union Jack defaced with the full coat of arms of Fiji on a white disc surrounded by a laurel wreath in the centre.
	1903–1908	Flag of the governor of Fiji	A Union Jack defaced with a white disc in the centre surrounded by a laurel wreath and containing a Tudor Crown surmounted by a crowned lion with the word "FIJI" beneath it.
	1883–1903	Flag of the governor of Fiji	A Union Jack defaced with a white disc in the centre surrounded by a laurel wreath and containing a Saint Edward's Crown surmounted by a crowned lion with the word "FIJI" beneath it.
	1877–1883	Flag of the governor of Fiji	A Union Jack defaced with a white disc in the centre surrounded by a laurel wreath and containing a badge of foliage and crossed war-clubs with a superimposed shield bearing a mermaid looking at herself in a hand mirror.

Ensigns
Flag	Date	Use	Description
	1970–1987	Customs ensign	A blue British ensign featuring the shield from the Fijian coat of arms with the word "H.M. CUSTOMS" beneath it in the fly.
	Pre–1970	Civil ensign	A red British ensign defaced with the coat of arms of Fiji on a white disc in the fly.
	1881–1966	Customs ensign	A blue British ensign with a white lower half defaced with the letters "HMC" within. The same design was prescribed for the Solomon Islands and the Gilbert and Ellice Islands.
	1871–1874	Civil ensign	The civil ensign of the Kingdom of Fiji. A white and blue bicolour with a red shield in the centre featuring a white dove holding an olive branch. Similar to the national flag of the time, but without the crown.

Separatist flags
Flag	Date	Use	Description
	2015	Flag of the Ra and Nadroga-Navosa Sovereign Christian States	
	2015	Flag of the Nadroga-Navosa Sovereign Christian State	
	2015	Flag of the Ra Sovereign Christian State	
	1987–1988	Flag of the Republic of Rotuma	

== Proposed flags ==
=== 2005 proposal ===
On 30 November 2005, Fiji's Great Council of Chiefs called for the restoration of the country's full coat of arms to the flag, including two warrior figures on either side of the shield, along with an outrigger canoe at the top and the national motto, Rerevaka na kalou ka doka na tui ("Fear God and honour the Queen") below it.

Flag	Date	Use	Description
	2005	Proposed flag for Fiji	A cyan ensign with the national coat of arms centred in the fly half.
	2005	Proposed flag for Fiji	A cyan field with a white shell in the centre.

=== 2015 proposals ===
On 3 February 2015, Prime Minister Frank Bainimarama confirmed a project to replace the national flag. He announced that a national competition to design the new flag would be held, with the aim of hoisting this flag on 11 October 2015, the 45th anniversary of independence. During the competition, over 2,000 designs were submitted, before a final shortlist of 23 was selected by Fiji's National Flag Committee on 9 June 2015. However, on 17 August 2016, Bainimarama publicly announced that the government was abandoning plans to change the flag. The decision was directly caused by the country's winning of its first ever Olympic gold medal that month, which spurred celebrations using the current flag.

Flag	Date	Use	Description
	2015	Proposed flag for Fiji	A horizontal tricolour of cyan, white, and blue, with two red flowers in the centre.
	2015	Proposed flag for Fiji	A cyan field with three seven-pointed stars and a white bordered blue isosceles triangle based on the hoist side with a shell inside the triangle.
	2015	Proposed flag for Fiji	A cyan field with a white bordered blue isosceles triangle based on the hoist side with a shell inside the triangle.
	2015	Proposed flag for Fiji	A cyan field with three seven-pointed stars and a white bordered blue isosceles triangle based on the hoist side with a turtle inside the triangle.
	2015	Proposed flag for Fiji	A cyan field with a white bordered blue isosceles triangle based on the hoist side with a turtle inside the triangle.
	2015	Proposed flag for Fiji	A cyan field with a blue horizontal stripe along the bottom and a red Fijian canoe in the centre.
	2015	Proposed flag for Fiji	A cyan field with a blue horizontal stripe along the bottom and a red Fijian canoe off-centred toward the hoist.
	2015	Proposed flag for Fiji	A cyan field with a waved version of the Fijian canoe with a brown coloured sail.
	2015	Proposed flag for Fiji	A horizontal waved bicolour of cyan and blue with a waved version of the Fijian canoe with a yellow coloured sail.
	2015	Proposed flag for Fiji	A horizontal waved bicolour of cyan and blue with a waved version of the Fijian canoe with a light yellow coloured sail.
	2015	Proposed flag for Fiji	A cyan field with seven golden five-pointed stars off-centred toward the hoist.
	2015	Proposed flag for Fiji	A cyan field with a white bordered blue isosceles triangle based on the hoist side with seven five-pointed stars inside the triangle.
	2015	Proposed flag for Fiji	A cyan field with a yellow bordered blue isosceles triangle based on the hoist side with a ten-pointed star inside the triangle.
	2015	Proposed flag for Fiji	Two equal horizontal bands of cyan (top) and blue with a yellow isosceles triangle based on the hoist side.
	2015	Proposed flag for Fiji	A cyan field with an eleven-pointed sun on the canton.
	2015	Proposed flag for Fiji	A cyan field with a twelve-pointed star in the centre.
	2015	Proposed flag for Fiji	A cyan field with a blue horizontal stripe along the bottom and a fourteen-pointed sun in the centre.
	2015	Proposed flag for Fiji	A cyan field with a white bordered blue isosceles triangle based on the hoist side with the Fijian canoe inside the triangle.
	2015	Proposed flag for Fiji	A cyan field with three seven-pointed stars and a white bordered blue isosceles triangle based on the hoist side with the Fijian canoe inside the triangle.
	2015	Proposed flag for Fiji	A cyan field with a blue horizontal stripe along the bottom and a white Fijian canoe in the centre.
	2015	Proposed flag for Fiji	A cyan field with a blue horizontal stripe along the bottom and a white Fijian canoe off-centred toward the hoist.
	2015	Proposed flag for Fiji	A cyan field with a waved version of the Fijian canoe with a brown coloured sail and a white seven-pointed star symbol inside the sail.
	2015	Proposed flag for Fiji	A cyan field with a waved version of the Fijian canoe with a brown coloured sail and a white palm tree symbol inside the sail.

== See also ==
- Flag of Tuvalu

== Sources ==
- High Commission of the Republic of the Fiji Islands to New Zealand – National Symbols of Fiji. "Ensigns for use in Government vessels, in merchant ships and in naval vessels are of the same basic design, but have dark blue, red and white background respectively". Accessed 2 February 2006
- Barraclough, E. M. C. and Crampton, W. G. (1978). Flags of the World. London: Frederick Warne. ISBN 0-7232-2015-8. P. 209 et seq. "The Civil Air Ensign is like that of Britain, except that it has the shield of Fiji placed on the arm of the cross."
