= Fiji at the 2011 World Aquatics Championships =

Sporting event delegation

Flag of Fiji

Fiji competed at the 2011 World Aquatics Championships in Shanghai, China between July 16 and 31, 2011.

== Swimming ==
Fiji qualified 3 swimmers.

Men

Athlete	Event	Heats		Semifinals		Final	
Athlete	Event	Time	Rank	Time	Rank	Time	Rank
Douglas Miller	Men's 100m Freestyle	56.06	78	did not advance			
Douglas Miller	Men's 400m Freestyle	4:20.74	45			did not advance	
Paul Elaisa	Men's 200m Freestyle	2:03.95	58	did not advance			
Paul Elaisa	Men's 200m IM	2:20.73	46	did not advance			

Women

Athlete	Event	Heats		Semifinals		Final	
Athlete	Event	Time	Rank	Time	Rank	Time	Rank
Matelita Buadromo	Women's 100m Breaststroke	1:14.70	38	did not advance			
Matelita Buadromo	Women's 200m Breaststroke	2:44.01	32	did not advance			
