= List of Papua New Guinean records in swimming =

The Papua New Guinean records in swimming are the fastest ever performances of swimmers representing Papua New Guinea. The records are recognised and ratified by the nations swimming federation: Papua New Guinea Swimming Inc. The records are for both long course (50m) and short course (25m) events.

The events include:

- freestyle: 50, 100, 200, 400, 800 and 1500;
- backstroke: 50, 100 and 200;
- breaststroke: 50, 100 and 200;
- butterfly: 50, 100 and 200;
- individual medley: 100 (25m pool only), 200 and 400;

All records were set in finals unless noted otherwise.

== Long Course (50 m) ==
=== Men ===
Event	Time		Name	Club	Date	Meet	Location	Ref
50 m freestyle	23.10		Ryan Pini	Papua New Guinea	10 July 2015	Pacific Games	Port Moresby, Papua New Guinea	
100 m freestyle	49.72	h	Ryan Pini	Papua New Guinea	12 August 2008	Olympic Games	Beijing, China	
200 m freestyle	1:49.04	h	Ryan Pini	Papua New Guinea	10 August 2008	Olympic Games	Beijing, China	
400 m freestyle	4:11.37		Ryan Pini	Papua New Guinea	30 August 2007	South Pacific Games	Apia, Samoa	
800 m freestyle	8:54.34		David McInnes	Papua New Guinea	1986	PNG Championships	Port Moresby, Papua New Guinea	
1500 m freestyle	16:56.41		David McInnes	Papua New Guinea	1986	PNG Championships	Port Moresby, Papua New Guinea	
50m backstroke	25.55		Ryan Pini	Papua New Guinea	13 April 2016	Australian Championships	Adelaide, Australia	
100m backstroke	54.99		Ryan Pini	Papua New Guinea	8 April 2016	Australian Championships	Adelaide, Australia	
200m backstroke	2:08.54		Ryan Pini	Papua New Guinea	2 July 2003	South Pacific Games	Suva, Fiji	
50m breaststroke	29.53	h	Ryan Maskelyne	Papua New Guinea	1 August 2022	Commonwealth Games	Birmingham, Great Britain	
100m breaststroke	1:03.31	h	Ryan Maskelyne	Papua New Guinea	30 July 2022	Commonwealth Games	Birmingham, Great Britain	
200m breaststroke	2:15.33	h	Ryan Maskelyne	Papua New Guinea	27 July 2021	Olympic Games	Tokyo, Japan	
50m butterfly	23.67	h, =	Ryan Pini	Papua New Guinea	7 April 2016	Australian Championships	Adelaide, Australia	
50m butterfly	23.67	=	Ryan Pini	Papua New Guinea	7 April 2016	Australian Championships	Adelaide, Australia	
100m butterfly	51.62	sf	Ryan Pini	Papua New Guinea	15 August 2008	Olympic Games	Beijing, China	
200m butterfly	2:12.85		Josh Wheeler	Papua New Guinea	August 1995	South Pacific Games	Papeete, French Polynesia	
200m individual medley	2:06.22		Ryan Pini	Papua New Guinea	1 September 2007	South Pacific Games	Apia, Samoa	
400m individual medley	4:44.84		Josh Wheeler	Papua New Guinea	August 1995	South Pacific Games	Papeete, French Polynesia	
4×100m freestyle relay	3:28.02		Samuel Seghers (51.51); Leo Biggs (54.05); Stanford Kawale (53.09); Ryan Pini (49.37)	Papua New Guinea	6 July 2015	Pacific Games	Port Moresby, Papua New Guinea	
4×200m freestyle relay	8:06.45		Samuel Seghers (1:56.67); Stanford Kawale; Shannon Liew; Ryan Pini	Papua New Guinea	7 July 2015	Pacific Games	Port Moresby, Papua New Guinea	
4×100m medley relay	3:49.53		Ryan Pini (56.65); Ryan Maskelyne (1:04.83); Samuel Seghers (55.17); Stanford Kawale (52.88)	Papua New Guinea	11 July 2015	Pacific Games	Port Moresby, Papua New Guinea	

Legend: # – Record awaiting ratification by Papua New Guinea Swimming; WR – World record; OC – Oceanian record;
Records not set in finals: h – heat; sf – semifinal; r – relay 1st leg; rh – relay heat 1st leg; b – B final; † – en route to final mark; so – swim-off; tt – time trial

=== Women ===
Event	Time		Name	Club	Date	Meet	Location	Ref
50 m freestyle	26.47	h	Anna-Liza Mopio-Jane	Papua New Guinea	15 August 2008	Olympic Games	Beijing, China	
100 m freestyle	57.97	h	Anna-Liza Mopio-Jane	Papua New Guinea	30 July 2009	World Championships	Rome, Italy	
200 m freestyle	2:07.37	h	Anna-Liza Mopio-Jane	Papua New Guinea	28 July 2009	World Championships	Rome, Italy	
400 m freestyle	4:37.13		Emma Huckins	Papua New Guinea	1993	Darwin Swimming Meet	Darwin, Australia	
800 m freestyle	9:33.05		Emma Huckins	Papua New Guinea	1991	PNG Championships	Port Moresby, Papua New Guinea	
1500 m freestyle	18:28.10		Emma Huckins	Papua New Guinea	1992	PNG Championships	Port Moresby, Papua New Guinea	
50 m backstroke	31.03	sf	Anna-Liza Mopio-Jane	Papua New Guinea	7 October 2010	Commonwealth Games	Delhi, India	
100 m backstroke	1:08.59		Anna-Liza Mopio-Jane	Papua New Guinea	22 June 2010	Oceania Championships	Apia, Samoa	
200 m backstroke	2:31.75		Roxine Arnold	Papua New Guinea	1991	PNG Championships	Port Moresby, Papua New Guinea	
50m breaststroke	34.25		Barbara Vali-Skelton	Papua New Guinea	2013	-	Brisbane, Australia	
100m breaststroke	1:16.03	h	Barbara Vali-Skelton	Papua New Guinea	29 July 2013	World Championships	Barcelona, Spain	
200m breaststroke	2:44.95		Tegan McCarthy	Papua New Guinea	7 July 2015	Pacific Games	Port Moresby, Papua New Guinea	
50 m butterfly	29.57		Georgia-Leigh Vele	Papua New Guinea	21 April 2024	Oceania Championships	Gold Coast, Australia	
100m butterfly	1:07.48		Tegan McCarthy	Papua New Guinea	10 July 2015	Pacific Games	Port Moresby, Papua New Guinea	
200m butterfly	2:45.73	h	Tegan McCarthy	Papua New Guinea	11 July 2015	Pacific Games	Port Moresby, Papua New Guinea	
200m individual medley	2:29.44		Anna-Liza Mopio-Jane	Papua New Guinea	31 August 2007	(South) Pacific Games	Apia, Samoa	
400m individual medley	6:01.94		Britney Murray	Papua New Guinea	6 July 2015	Pacific Games	Port Moresby, Papua New Guinea	
4×100m freestyle relay	4:11.52		Savannah Tkatchenko; Ebony Tkatchenko; Barbara Vali-Skelton; Anna-Liza Mopio-Jane	Papua New Guinea	6 July 2015	Pacific Games	Port Moresby, Papua New Guinea	
4×200m freestyle relay	9:12.16		Anna-Liza Mopio-Jane (2:15.57); Ebony Tkatchenko (2:19.80); Barbara Vali-Skelton (2:21.54); Savannah Tkatchenko (2:15.25)	Papua New Guinea	10 July 2015	Pacific Games	Port Moresby, Papua New Guinea	
4×100m medley relay	4:38.31		Shanice Paraka; Savannah Tkatchenko; Tegan McCarthy; Anna-Liza Mopio-Jane	Papua New Guinea	11 July 2015	Pacific Games	Port Moresby, Papua New Guinea	

Legend: # – Record awaiting ratification by Papua New Guinea Swimming; WR – World record; OC – Oceanian record;
Records not set in finals: h – heat; sf – semifinal; r – relay 1st leg; rh – relay heat 1st leg; b – B final; † – en route to final mark; so – swim-off; tt – time trial

=== Mixed relay ===
Event	Time		Name	Club	Date	Meet	Location	Ref
4×50 m freestyle relay	1:40.02		Anna-Liza Mopio-Jane (27.48); Samuel Seghers (22.62); Savannah Tkatchenko (27.70); Ryan Pini (22.22)	Papua New Guinea	9 July 2015	Pacific Games	Port Moresby, Papua New Guinea	
4×100 m freestyle relay	3:53.46	h	Samuel Seghers (52.84); Georgia-Leigh Vele (1:02.29); Judith Meauri (1:03.66); Ryan Maskelyne (54.67)	Papua New Guinea	27 July 2019	World Championships	Gwangju, South Korea	
4×50 m medley relay	1:52.04		Ryan Pini (25.95); Barbara Vali-Skelton; Samuel Seghers; Anna-Liza Mopio-Jane	Papua New Guinea	8 July 2015	Pacific Games	Port Moresby, Papua New Guinea	
4×100 m medley relay	4:13.90	h	Ryan Pini; Tegan McCarthy; Samuel Seghers; Barbara Vali-Skelton	Papua New Guinea	5 August 2015	World Championships	Kazan, Russia	

Legend: # – Record awaiting ratification by Papua New Guinea Swimming Inc.; WR – World record; OC – Oceanian record;
Records not set in finals: h – heat; so – swim-off

== Short Course (25 m) ==
=== Men ===
Event	Time		Name	Club	Date	Meet	Location	Ref
50m freestyle	22.16	h	Ryan Pini	Papua New Guinea	4 December 2014	World Championships	Doha, Qatar	
100m freestyle	48.24	h	Ryan Pini	Papua New Guinea	6 December 2014	World Championships	Doha, Qatar	
200m freestyle	1:52.08	h	Samuel Seghers	Papua New Guinea	7 December 2016	World Championships	Windsor, Canada	
400m freestyle	4:30.83	h	Sheldon Plummer	Papua New Guinea	5 December 2014	World Championships	Doha, Qatar	
800 m freestyle								
1500 m freestyle								
50m backstroke	24.08	rh	Ryan Pini	Papua New Guinea	4 December 2014	World Championships	Doha, Qatar	
100m backstroke	51.93	h	Ryan Pini	Papua New Guinea	3 December 2014	World Championships	Doha, Qatar	
200m backstroke	1:59.37	h	Ryan Pini	Papua New Guinea	7 December 2014	World Championships	Doha, Qatar	
50m breaststroke	29.14	h	Thomas Chen	Papua New Guinea	14 December 2024	World Championships	Budapest, Hungary	
100m breaststroke	1:02.19	h	Ryan Maskelyne	Papua New Guinea	22 September 2017	Asian Indoor and Martial Arts Games	Ashgabat, Turkmenistan	
200m breaststroke	2:17.57	h	Ryan Maskelyne	Papua New Guinea	8 December 2016	World Championships	Windsor, Canada	
50m butterfly	23.31	h	Ryan Pini	Papua New Guinea	5 December 2014	World Championships	Doha, Qatar	
100m butterfly	52.18		Ryan Pini	Papua New Guinea	9 November 2011	World Cup	Beijing, China	
200 m butterfly								
100m individual medley	59.51	h	Ryan Maskelyne	Papua New Guinea	25 September 2017	Asian Indoor and Martial Arts Games	Ashgabat, Turkmenistan	
200m individual medley	2:15.28	h	Leonard Kalate	Papua New Guinea	22 September 2017	Asian Indoor and Martial Arts Games	Ashgabat, Turkmenistan	
400m individual medley								
4×50m freestyle relay	1:34.77	h	Livingston Aika (24.87); Ashley Seeto (24.40); Stanford Kawale (23.18); Ryan Pini (22.32)	Papua New Guinea	9 December 2016	World Championships	Windsor, Canada	
4×100m freestyle relay	3:26.76	h	Samuel Seghers (50.84); Stanford Kawale (52.78); Livingston Aika (54.08); Ryan Pini (49.06)	Papua New Guinea	6 December 2016	World Championships	Windsor, Canada	
4×200 m freestyle relay								
4×50m medley relay	1:43.99	h	Ryan Pini (24.56); Ashley Seeto (29.03); Stanford Kawale (26.28); Samuel Seghers (24.12)	Papua New Guinea	10 December 2016	World Championships	Windsor, Canada	
4×100m medley relay	3:51.10	h	Livingston Aika (1:02.53); Ryan Maskelyne (1:03.50); Ryan Pini (52.79); Stanford Kawale (52.28)	Papua New Guinea	11 December 2016	World Championships	Windsor, Canada	

Legend: # – Record awaiting ratification by Papua New Guinea Swimming; WR – World record; OC – Oceanian record;
Records not set in finals: h – heat; sf – semifinal; r – relay 1st leg; rh – relay heat 1st leg; b – B final; † – en route to final mark; so – swim-off; tt – time trial

=== Women ===
Event	Time		Name	Club	Date	Meet	Location	Ref
50m freestyle	26.76	h	Anna-Liza Mopio-Jane	Papua New Guinea	6 December 2014	World Championships	Doha, Qatar	
100m freestyle	58.79	h	Anna-Liza Mopio-Jane	Papua New Guinea	4 December 2014	World Championships	Doha, Qatar	
200m freestyle	2:13.04	h	Anna-Liza Mopio-Jane	Papua New Guinea	7 December 2014	World Championships	Doha, Qatar	
400 m freestyle								
800 m freestyle								
1500 m freestyle								
50m backstroke	30.98	h	Anna-Liza Mopio-Jane	Papua New Guinea	6 December 2014	World Championships	Doha, Qatar	
100m backstroke	1:07.98	h	Anna-Liza Mopio-Jane	Papua New Guinea	3 December 2014	World Championships	Doha, Qatar	
200 m backstroke								
50m breaststroke	33.79	h	B. Vali-Skelton	Papua New Guinea	12 December 2012	World Championships	Istanbul, Turkey	
100m breaststroke	1:13.73	h	B. Vali-Skelton	Papua New Guinea	14 December 2012	World Championships	Istanbul, Turkey	
200m breaststroke	2:40.78	h	Savannah Tkatchenko	Papua New Guinea	7 December 2014	World Championships	Doha, Qatar	
50m butterfly	28.95	h	Jhnayali Tokome-Garap	Papua New Guinea	10 December 2024	World Championships	Budapest, Hungary	
100m butterfly	1:09.60	h	Tegan McCarthy	Papua New Guinea	6 December 2014	World Championships	Doha, Qatar	
200 m butterfly								
100m individual medley	1:08.61	h	Savannah Tkatchenko	Papua New Guinea	4 December 2014	World Championships	Doha, Qatar	
200m individual medley	2:30.07	h	Savannah Tkatchenko	Papua New Guinea	6 December 2014	World Championships	Doha, Qatar	
400 m individual medley								
4×50 m freestyle relay								
4×100m freestyle relay	4:08.36	h	Savannah Tkatchenko (1:01.90); Shanice Paraka (1:03.50); Tegan McCarthy (1:04.60); Anna-Liza Mopio-Jane (58.36)	Papua New Guinea	5 December 2014	World Championships	Doha, Qatar	
4×200 m freestyle relay								
4×50m medley relay	2:03.88	h	Shanice Paraka (31.38); Savannah Tkatchenko (34.85); Tegan McCarthy (30.85); Anna-Liza Mopio-Jane (26.80)	Papua New Guinea	5 December 2014	World Championships	Doha, Qatar	
4×100 m medley relay								

Legend: # – Record awaiting ratification by Papua New Guinea Swimming; WR – World record; OC – Oceanian record;
Records not set in finals: h – heat; sf – semifinal; r – relay 1st leg; rh – relay heat 1st leg; b – B final; † – en route to final mark; so – swim-off; tt – time trial

=== Mixed relay ===
Event	Time		Name	Club	Date	Meet	Location	Ref
4×50m freestyle relay	1:40.38	h	Stanford Kawale (23.86); Shanice Paraka (28.47); Anna-Liza Mopio-Jane (26.70); Ryan Pini (21.35)	Papua New Guinea	6 December 2014	World Championships	Doha, Qatar	
4×50m medley relay	1:50.71	h	Ryan Pini (24.08); Savannah Tkatchenko (34.30); Stanford Kawale (25.67); Anna-Liza Mopio-Jane (26.66)	Papua New Guinea	4 December 2014	World Championships	Doha, Qatar	

Legend: # – Record awaiting ratification by Papua New Guinea Swimming;
Records not set in finals: h – heat; so – swim-off
