= List of Pacific Games records in swimming =

The fastest times in the swimming events at the Pacific Games (formerly known as the South Pacific Games) are designated as the Pacific Games records in swimming. The events are held in a long course (50 m) pool. The last Games were held in Apia, Samoa in 2019.

All records were set in finals unless noted otherwise.

== Long Course (50 m) ==
=== Men ===
Event	Time		Name	Nationality	Date	Meet	Location	Ref
50m freestyle	23.03		Julien Goyetche	New Caledonia	13 July 2019	2019 Games	Apia, Samoa	
100m freestyle	50.44	r	Stephane Debaere	Tahiti	6 July 2015	2015 Games	Port Moresby, Papua New Guinea	
200m freestyle	1:50.72		Ryan Pini	Papua New Guinea	2007	2007 Games	Apia, Samoa	
400m freestyle	3:56.35		Rahiti de Vos	Tahiti	July 2019	2019 Games	Apia, Samoa	
1500m freestyle	15:40.47		Rahiti de Vos	Tahiti	12 July 2019	2019 Games	Apia, Samoa	
50m backstroke	25.95	r	Ryan Pini	Papua New Guinea	8 July 2015	2015 Games	Port Moresby, Papua New Guinea	
100m backstroke	56.00		Ryan Pini	Papua New Guinea	10 July 2015	2015 Games	Port Moresby, Papua New Guinea	
200m backstroke	2:08.31		Olivier Saminadin	New Caledonia	1999	1999 Games	Hagåtña, Guam	
50m breaststroke	28.20		Amini Fonua	Tonga	8 July 2015	2015 Games	Port Moresby, Papua New Guinea	
100m breaststroke	1:02.84		Taichi Vakasama	Fiji	13 July 2019	2019 Games	Apia, Samoa	
200m breaststroke	2:17.06		Thomas Dahlia	New Caledonia	29 August 2011	2011 Games	Nouméa, New Caledonia	
50m butterfly	23.93		Ryan Pini	Papua New Guinea	9 July 2015	2015 Games	Port Moresby, Papua New Guinea	
100m butterfly	53.42		Ryan Pini	Papua New Guinea	7 July 2015	2015 Games	Port Moresby, Papua New Guinea	
200m butterfly	2:02.29		Thibaut Mary	New Caledonia	13 July 2019	2019 Games	Apia, Samoa	
200m individual medley	2:04.04		Emmanuel Limozin	New Caledonia	12 July 2019	2019 Games	Apia, Samoa	
400m individual medley	4:24.04		Brandon Schuster	Samoa	10 July 2019	2019 Games	Apia, Samoa	
4×100m freestyle relay	3:23.21		Florent Janin (50.46); Emmanuel Limozin (49.91); Julien Goyetche (51.81); Thibaut Mary (51.03)	New Caledonia	11 July 2019	2019 Games	Apia, Samoa	
4×200m freestyle relay	7:37.50		Hugo Lambert (1:53.26); Rahiti de Vos (1:52.38); Stephane Debaere (1:53.92); Anthony Clark (1:57.94)	Tahiti	7 July 2015	2015 Games	Port Moresby, Papua New Guinea	
4×100m medley relay	3:48.33		Julien Goyetche; Thomas Oswald; Thibaut Mary; Florent Janin	New Caledonia	9 July 2019	2019 Games	Apia, Samoa	

Legend: # – Record awaiting ratification by Pacific Games Council; WR – World record; OC – Oceanian record;
Records not set in finals: h – heat; r – relay 1st leg; rh – relay heat 1st leg; † – en route to final mark; so – swim-off

=== Women ===
Event	Time		Name	Nationality	Date	Meet	Location	Ref
50m freestyle	26.26		Emma Terebo	New Caledonia	11 July 2015	2015 Games	Port Moresby, Papua New Guinea	
100m freestyle	57.20		Caroline Pickering	Fiji	2007	2007 Games	Apia, Samoa	
200m freestyle	2:03.77		Lara Grangeon	New Caledonia	7 July 2015	2015 Games	Port Moresby, Papua New Guinea	
400m freestyle	4:20.40		Lara Grangeon	New Caledonia	8 July 2015	2015 Games	Port Moresby, Papua New Guinea	
800m freestyle	8:52.99		Lara Grangeon	New Caledonia	9 July 2015	2015 Games	Port Moresby, Papua New Guinea	
50m backstroke	29.18		Emma Terebo	New Caledonia	7 July 2015	2015 Games	Port Moresby, Papua New Guinea	
100m backstroke	1:02.60		Emma Terebo	New Caledonia	8 July 2015	2015 Games	Port Moresby, Papua New Guinea	
200m backstroke	2:20.78		Lara Grangeon	New Caledonia	29 August 2011	2011 Games	Nouméa, New Caledonia	
50m breaststroke	32.50	h	Adeline Williams	New Caledonia	8 July 2015	2015 Games	Port Moresby, Papua New Guinea	
100m breaststroke	1:11.05		Adeline Williams	New Caledonia	9 July 2015	2015 Games	Port Moresby, Papua New Guinea	
200m breaststroke	2:33.20		Lara Grangeon	New Caledonia	7 July 2015	2015 Games	Port Moresby, Papua New Guinea	
50m butterfly	27.13		Diane Bui Duyet	New Caledonia	29 August 2011	2011 Games	Nouméa, New Caledonia	
100m butterfly	1:00.47		Diane Bui Duyet	New Caledonia	31 August 2011	2011 Games	Nouméa, New Caledonia	
200m butterfly	2:11.89		Lara Grangeon	New Caledonia	11 July 2015	2015 Games	Port Moresby, Papua New Guinea	
200m individual medley	2:17.84		Lara Grangeon	New Caledonia	10 July 2015	2015 Games	Port Moresby, Papua New Guinea	
400m individual medley	4:47.07		Lara Grangeon	New Caledonia	6 July 2015	2015 Games	Port Moresby, Papua New Guinea	
4×100m freestyle relay	3:57.23		Lea Ricarrere (1:00.32); Emma Terebo (58.42); Armelle Hidrio (1:00.77); Lara Grangeon (57.72)	New Caledonia	6 July 2015	2015 Games	Port Moresby, Papua New Guinea	
4×200m freestyle relay	8:51.41		Diane Bui Duyet; Delphine Bui Duyet; Reine-Victoria Weber; Lara Grangeon	New Caledonia	2007	2007 Games	Apia, Samoa	
4×100m medley relay	4:23.64		Emma Terebo (1:07.42); Adeline Williams (1:12.15); Lara Grangeon (1:02.76); Armelle Hidrio (1:01.31)	New Caledonia	11 July 2015	2015 Games	Port Moresby, Papua New Guinea	

Legend: # – Record awaiting ratification by Pacific Games Council; WR – World record; OC – Oceanian record;
Records not set in finals: h – heat; r – relay 1st leg; rh – relay heat 1st leg; † – en route to final mark; so – swim-off

=== Mixed relay ===
Event	Time	Name	Nationality	Date	Meet	Location	Ref
4×50m freestyle relay	1:39.79	Julien Goyetche; Armelle Hidrio; Emma Terebo; Florent Janin	New Caledonia	12 July 2019	2019 Games	Apia, Samoa	
4×50m medley relay	1:49.18	Emma Terebo; Thomas Oswald; May Toven; Florent Janin	New Caledonia	13 July 2019	2019 Games	Apia, Samoa	

Legend: # – Record awaiting ratification by Pacific Games Council; WR – World record; OC – Oceanian record;
Records not set in finals: h – heat; so – swim-off
