= Swimming at the 2005 South Pacific Mini Games =

The swimming competition at the 2005 South Pacific Mini Games in Palau was held July 25–30. The venues for the events were:

- pool: National Aquatics Center in Meyuns; and
- open water: Palau Pacific Resort Beach.

All pool events were swum in a 6-lane, short-course (25m) pool; the open water events were 5-kilometres in length (5K).

Two notes, related to the organization of the meet:

1. Swimmers who were to compete at the 2005 World Championships, were not allowed to swim in the Mini Games (although the competitions were at the same time).
2. Full medals were only given out in events with five or more entrants. If an event had four entrants, only the gold and silver medals were award; if an event had only two or three entrants, only the gold medal. Events with fewer than three medals awarded are noted under the event name.

== Event schedule ==
Date	Mon. July 25.	Tue. July 26.	Wed. July 27.	Thu. July 28.	Fri. July 29.	Sat. July 30.
E v e n t s	50 back (M); 100 free (W); 100 breast (M); 400 I.M. (F); 200 free (M); 4x200 Free Relay (W); 50 back (W); 100 fly (M)	200 free (W); 400 I.M. (M); 200 breast (W); 4x200 Free Relay (M); 50 breast (W); 50 breast (M); 400 free (W); 100 free (M)	100 back (W); 200 back (M); 4x100 Free Relay (W); 400 free (M); 100 fly (W); 50 fly (M); 100 breast (W); 200 breast (M)	800 free (W); 4x100 Free Relay (M); 50 free (M); 200 I.M. (W); 200 fly (M); 50 fly (W); 100 back (M); 4x100 Medley Relay (W)	200 fly (W); 200 I.M. (M); 50 free (W); 1500 free (M); 200 back (W); 4x100 Medley Relay (M)	5K (W); 5K (M)

Note: This is the same event order as the 2003 South Pacific Games and 2007 South Pacific Games. However, the pool competition is 1 day shorter, which is accomplished by having eight events per day on the first four pool days, rather than six.

== Results ==
=== Men ===
Event	Gold		Silver		Bronze	
50m Freestyle	David Thevenot (NCL)	22.88	Calum Liew (FIJ)	23.93	Eric Lassauvagerie (NCL)	24.95
100m Freestyle	David Thevenot (NCL)	50.80	Calum Liew (FIJ)	53.42	Eric Lassauvagerie (NCL)	54.10
200m Freestyle	Olivier Saminadin (NCL)	1:54.00	David Thevenot (NCL)	1:55.25	Eric Lassauvagerie (NCL)	2:01.95
400m Freestyle	Olivier Saminadin (NCL)	4:00.84	Benoit Riviere (NCL)	4:15.96	Thomas Chacun (NCL)	4:27.29
1500m Freestyle (gold only)	Olivier Saminadin (NCL)	16:30.78	Benoit Riviere (NCL)	16:47.59	Thomas Chacun (NCL)	17:07.80
50m Backstroke	David Thevenot (NCL)	28.21	David Palacios (MNP)	28.75	Mathieu Mengin (NCL)	29.42
100m Backstroke	Olivier Saminadin (NCL)	59.20	Mathieu Mengin (NCL)	1:03.14	Celestino Aguon (NCL)	1:06.06
200m Backstroke	Olivier Saminadin (NCL)	2:16.01	Mathieu Mengin (NCL)	2:21.87	Juan Camacho (NCL)	2:24.94
50m Breaststroke	Adrien Thomas (NCL)	30.55	Calum Liew (FIJ)	30.69	Celestino Aguon (GUM)	32.06
100m Breaststroke	Adrien Thomas (NCL)	1:05.51	Calum Liew (FIJ)	1:05.84	Celestino Aguon (GUM)	1:10.86
200m Breaststroke	Adrien Thomas (NCL)	2:20.79	Calum Liew (FIJ)	2:31.93	Celestino Aguon (GUM)	2:32.13
50m Butterfly	David Thevenot (NCL)	25.09	David Palacios (MNP)	27.12	Mathieu Mengin (NCL)	27.62
100m Butterfly	Olivier Saminadin (NCL)	57.89	David Palacios (MNP)	1:00.07	Thomas Chacun (NCL)	1:02.46
200m Butterfly (gold only)	Thomas Chacun (NCL)	2:14.87	David Palacios (MNP)	2:16.81	Benoit Riviere (NCL)	2:27.62
200m I.M.	Olivier Saminadin (NCL)	2:13.25	Adrien Thomas (NCL)	2:20.62	Tetsuya Iijima (GUM)	2:25.78
400m I.M.	Olivier Saminadin (NCL)	4:45.80	Benoit Riviere (NCL)	4:57.87	Mathieu Mengin (NCL)	5:01.19
400m Free Relay (gold & silver only)	New Caledonia; Adrien Thomas, Eric Lassauvagerie, Benoit Riviere, Mathieu Mengin	3:43.48	Guam; Carlos Shimizu, Trevor Plate, Tetsuya Iijima, Celestino Aguon	3:54.39	(Northern Mariana Islands) Northern Marianas; Juan Camacho, Rezne Wong, Michael Camacho, David Palacios	4:09.31
800m Free Relay (gold & silver only)	New Caledonia; Benoit Riviere, Eric Lassauvagerie, Adrien Thomas, Thomas Chaucun	8:30.56	Guam; Celestino Aguon, Lucas Shimizu, Tetsuya Iijima, Carols Shimizu	8:36.76	(Northern Mariana Islands) Northern Marianas; David Palacios, Juan Camacho, Michael Comacho, Rezne Wong	8:54.76
400m Medley Relay (gold & silver only)	New Caledonia; Mathieu Mengin, Ollivier Saminadin, Adrien Thomas, David Thevenot	3:57.15	(Northern Mariana Islands) Northern Marianas; Michael Comacho, Rezne Wong, David Palacios, Juan Camacho	4:24.21	Guam; Celestino Aguon, Lucas Shimizu, Tetsuya Iijima, Carols Shimizu	4:28.59
5K Open Water (time= hr:min:sec)	Olivier Saminadin (NCL)	1:08:26	Benoit Riviere (NCL)	1:08:33	Thomas Chacun (NCL)	1:09:04

=== Women ===
Event	Gold		Silver		Bronze	
50m Freestyle	Nina Mosley (NCL)	28.09	Esther Meallet (NCL)	28.30	ines Horngren (NCL)	28.91
100m Freestyle	Nina Mosley (MNP)	1:00.37	Esther Meallet (NCL)	1:01.55	Manami Iijima (GUM)	1:02.02
200m Freestyle	Esther Meallet (NCL)	2:11.81	Nina Mosely (MNP)	2:12.58	Ines Horngren (NCL)	2:13.29
400m Freestyle	Delphine Bui Duyet (NCL)	4:45.30	Nina Mosely (MNP)	4:46.21	Ines Horngren (NCL)	4:47.61
800m Freestyle (gold & silver only)	Ines Horngren (NCL)	9:54.36	Esther Meallet (NCL)	10:02.46	Carolyn Coleman-Moala (MNP)	10:23.47
50m Backstroke	Nyitre Simon (NCL)	31.31	Maraya Silan (GUM)	32.54	Delphine Bui Duyet (NCL)	32.64
100m Backstroke	Delphine Bui Duyet (NCL)	1:09.00	Nina Mosley (MNP)	1:10.12	Ines Horngren (NCL)	1:10.45
200m Backstroke	Delphine Bui Duyet (NCL)	2:27.77	Nyitrue Simon (NCL)	2:29.15	Nina Mosley (MNP)	2:35.84
50m Breaststroke	Adeline Williams (NCL)	34.74	Esther Meallet (NCL)	35.96	Vuki Kuinikoro (FIJ) Fiji	36.94
100m Breaststroke	Adeline Williams (NCL)	1:16.34	Esther Meallet (NCL)	1:17.93	Minerva Cabrera (MNP)	1:20.03
200m Breaststroke	Adeline Williams (NCL)	2:49.49	Esther Meallet (NCL)	2:51.78	Myana Welch (MNP)	2:53.35
50m Butterfly	Nyitrue Simon (NCL)	29.98	Nina Mosley (MNP)	30.73	Delphine Bui Duyet (NCL)	31.41
100m Butterfly	Nyitrue Simon (NCL)	1:06.96	Delphine Bui Duyet (NCL)	1:09.36	Manami Iijima (GUM)	1:09.97
200m Butterfly (gold only)	Nyitrue Simon (NCL)	2:31.80	Amanda Coleman (NCL)	2:41.47	none	
200m I.M.	Delphine Bui Duyet (NCL)	2:31.72	Esther Meallet (NCL)	2:31.78	Manami Iijima (GUM)	2:32.99
400m I.M.	Nyitre Simon (NCL)	5:24.07	Esther Meallet (NCL)	5:29.88	Nina Mosley (MNP)	5:33.41
400m Free Relay (gold & silver only)	New Caledonia; Esther Meallet, Nyitrue Simon, Ines Horngren, Delphine Bui Duyet	4:16.62	(Northern Mariana Islands) Northern Marianas; Caroline Coleman-Moala, Minerva Cabrera, Nina Mosley, Nicole Calvo	4:19.26	Guam; Tara Benavente, Jenina Cruz, Mayan Silan, Marayna Silan	4:30.50
800m Free Relay (gold & silver only)	New Caledonia; Ines Horngren, Esther Meallet, Nyitrue Simon, Delphine Bui Duyet	9:14.51	(Northern Mariana Islands) Northern Marianas; Caroline Coleman-Moala, Nicole Calvo, Amanda Johnson, Nina Mosley	9:24.50	Guam; Tara Benavente, Jenina Cruz, Mayan Silan, Manami Iijima	9:57.85
400m Medley Relay (gold & silver only)	New Caledonia; Delphine Bui Duyet, Adeline Williams, Nyitrue Simon, Esther Meallet	4:36.73	(Northern Mariana Islands) Northern Marianas; Myana Welch, Minerva Cabrera, Amanda Johnson, Nina Mosley	4:51.41	Guam; Maraya Silan, Mayan Silan, Manami Iijima, Tara Benavente	4:54.87
5K Open Water (time= hr:min:sec)	Esther Meallet (NCL)	1:10:13.30	Nina Mosley (MNP)	1:16:33.04	Caroline Coleman-Moala (MNP)	1:19:39.89

== Participating countries ==
57 swimmers from 8 countries were entered in the swimming events at the 2005 Mini Games. Countries with swimmers present were:

- American Samoa (2)
- Fiji (2)
- Guam (10)
- Marshall Islands (1)
- New Caledonia (15)
- Northern Mariana Islands (11)
- Palau (10)
- Papua New Guinea (6)
