= Swimming at the 1999 South Pacific Games =

- Location: Agana, Guam
- Dates: 30 May-5 June 1999

Swimming at the 1999 South Pacific Games took place in Agana, the capital of Guam, at the Southern High School Pool between 30 May and 5 June 1999. It was the eleventh edition of the South Pacific Games. Men's and women's open water events of 5 kilometres were introduced in 1999, with swimmers from American Samoa, Fiji, Guam, New Caledonia, Northern Marianas, Micronesia, Palau, Papua New Guinea, Samoa, and Tahiti competing.

== Medal summary ==
=== Medal table ===
* Host nation (Guam)

Rank	Nation	Gold	Silver	Bronze	Total
1	New Caledonia	22	13	11	46
2	Fiji	6	6	2	14
3	Papua New Guinea	5	5	7	17
4	Northern Mariana Islands	1	3	6	10
5	Guam*	0	6	3	9
6	French Polynesia	0	0	2	2
Totals (6 entries)		34	33	31	98

=== Men ===
New Caledonia dominated the men's events, winning 14 of the 17 races. Olivier Saminadin collected a personal tally of 13 gold medals including the 5 km open water event.

Event	Gold		Silver		Bronze	
50 m Freestyle	Leo Biggs (PNG)	23.71	Carl Probert (FIJ)	24.05	Darrick Bollinger (GUM)	24.14
100 m Freestyle	Leo Biggs (PNG)	51.28 GR	Carl Probert (FIJ)	52.16	Darrick Bollinger (GUM)	52.75
200 m Freestyle	Olivier Saminadin (NCL)	1:53.91 GR	Leo Biggs (PNG)	1:54.53	Carl Probert (FIJ)	1:54.84
400 m Freestyle	Olivier Saminadin (NCL)	4:11.52	Carl Probert (FIJ)	4:13.83	Daniel O'Keeffe (GUM)	4:17.91
1500 m Freestyle	Olivier Saminadin (NCL)	16:24.88	Ben Wells (PNG)	17:17.52	David Thevenot (NCL)	17:58.51
100 m Backstroke	Ryan Pini (PNG)	1:01.48	Oliver Saminadin (NCL)	1:02.15	Cedric Petre (NCL)	1:04.56
200 m Backstroke	Olivier Saminadin (NCL)	2:08.31 GR	Carl Probert (FIJ)	2:09.64	Ryan Pini (PNG)	2:16.89
100 m Breaststroke	Stephen Hirzel (NCL)	1:07.41	Peter Manglona (GUM)	1:09.03	Rainui Teriipaia (TAH)	1:10.75
200 m Breaststroke	Olivier Saminadin (NCL)	2:23.48 GR	Stephen Hirzel (NCL)	2:28.26	Justin Pierce (MNP)	2:30.56
100 m Butterfly	Olivier Saminadin (NCL)	56.12 GR	Ryan Pini (PNG)	57.11	Cedric Petre (NCL)	58.19
200 m Butterfly	Olivier Saminadin (NCL)	2:08.30	Daniel O'Keeffe (GUM)	2:11.95	Laurent Douarche (NCL)	2:13.00
200 m Medley	Olivier Saminadin (NCL)	2:08.24 GR	Daniel O'Keeffe (GUM)	2:12.18	Carl Probert (FIJ)	2:12.45
400 m Medley	Olivier Saminadin (NCL)	4.33.11 GR	Daniel O'Keeffe (GUM)	4:54.01	Ben Wells (PNG)	4:54.05
4 × 100 m Freestyle relay	New Caledonia; O. Saminadin; S. Hirzel; C. Petre; D. Thevonot	3:36.02	Guam; J. Taitano; P. Manglona; D. O'Keeffe; D. Bollinger	3:39.25	French Polynesia; B. Richide; M. Sanford; R. Teriipaia; E. Tetahiotupa	4:00.35
^{†}4 × 200 m Freestyle relay (gold only in tally)^{a}	New Caledonia; D. Thevenot; C. Petre; L. Douarche; O. Saminadin	8:07.1	Guam^{a} M. Flores; J. Taitano; D. O'Keeffe; D. Bollinger	8:21.40	French Polynesia^{a} B. Richide; M. Sanford; R. Teriipaia; E. Tetahiotupa	8:51.04
^{†}4 × 100 m Medley relay (no bronze in tally)^{b}	New Caledonia; O. Saminadin; S. Hirzel; C. Petre; D. Thevonot	4:01.37 GR	Guam; J. Taitano; P. Manglona; D. O'Keeffe; D. Bollinger	4:05.17	French Polynesia^{b} B. Richide; M. Sanford; R. Teriipaia; E. Tetahiotupa	4:18.32
Open water 5 km	Olivier Saminadin (NCL)		Carl Probert (FIJ)		Laurent Douarche (NCL)	

=== Women ===
New Caledonia won 8 of the 17 women's events. Fiji won 6 gold medals due to the performance of Caroline Pickering. Lara Grangeon won the 5 km open water event.

Event	Gold		Silver		Bronze	
50 m Freestyle	Caroline Pickering (FIJ)	26.92 GR	Manina Tehei (NCL)	27.50	Florence Alaux (NCL)	27.99
100 m Freestyle	Caroline Pickering (FIJ)	59.14	Manina Tehei (NCL)	1:00.50	Namiko Kobayashi (PNG)	1:02.23
200 m Freestyle	Caroline Pickering (FIJ)	2:10.20 GR	Florence Alaux (NCL)	2:12.99	Namiko Kobayashi (PNG)	2:13.81
400 m Freestyle	Namiko Kobayashi (PNG)	4:39.45	Lara Grangeon (NCL)	4:39.82	Aurelia Dubois-Duvivier (NCL)	4:43.55
800 m Freestyle	Namiko Kobayashi (PNG)	9:40.27	Charlotte Robin (NCL)	9:46.29	Aurelia Dubois-Duvivier (NCL)	9:58.98
100 m Backstroke	Caroline Pickering (FIJ)	1:05.80 GR	Marie Simon (NCL)	1:10.94	Tracy Feger (MNP)	1:12.17
200 m Backstroke	Caroline Pickering (FIJ)	2:29.04	Xenavee Pangelinan (MNP)	2:32.92	Lara Grangeon (NCL)	2:33.92
100 m Breaststroke	Manina Tehei (NCL)	1:16.91	Florence Alaux (NCL)	1:20.85	Jennifer Pierce (MNP)	1:21.10
200 m Breaststroke	Manina Tehei (NCL)	2:47.24	Lara Grangeon (NCL)	2:52.81	Jennifer Pierce (MNP)	2:53.85
100 m Butterfly	Diane Buiduyet (NCL)	1:03.99 GR	Caroline Pickering (FIJ)	1:05.69	Xenavee Pangelinan (MNP)	1:07.47
200 m Butterfly	Diane Buiduyet (NCL)	2:25.92 GR	Xenavee Pangelinan (MNP)	2:26.68	Namiko Kobayashi (PNG)	2:34.70
200 m Medley	Caroline Pickering (FIJ)	2:27.53	Diane Buiduyet (NCL)	2:27.68	Manina Tehei (NCL)	2:29.27
400 m Medley	Xenavee Pangelinan (MNP)	5:15.65 GR	Lara Grangeon (NCL)	5:16.95	Namiko Kobayashi (PNG)	5:18.51
4 × 100 m Freestyle relay	New Caledonia; A. Dubois-Duvuivuer; M. Tehei; F. Alaux; L. Grangeon	4:08.02 GR	Northern Marianas; A. Winfield; D. Placios; T. Feger; X. Pangelinan	4:20.13	Papua New Guinea; K. Dunlop; X. Peni; A. Manchur; N. Kobayashi	4:20.69
^{*}4 × 200 m Freestyle relay	New Caledonia; A. Dubois-Duvuivuer; M. Tehei; F. Alaux; D. Bui-Duyet	9:11.34	Papua New Guinea; K. Dunlop; X. Peni; A. Manchur; N. Kobayashi	9:27.61	Northern Marianas; A. Winfield; T. Winfield; T. Feger; X. Pangelinan	9:36.49
^{†}4 × 100 m Medley relay (no bronze in tally)^{c}	New Caledonia; M. Simon; M. Tehei; D. Bui-Duyet; F. Alaux	4:40.79	Papua New Guinea; A. Manchur; X. Peni; K. Dunlop; N. Kobayashi	4:51.52	Northern Marianas^{c} T. Feger; J. Pierce; X. Pangelinan; D. Palacios	4:52.02
Open water 5 km	Lara Grangeon (NCL)		Florence Alaux (NCL)		Aurelia Dubois-Duvivier (NCL)	

== Participating countries ==
Swimmers from 9 countries were entered in the swimming events at the 1999 Games. The teams were:

- Fiji
- Guam
- Marshall Islands
- Micronesia
- Northern Marianas
- New Caledonia
- Palau
- Papua New Guinea
- Tahiti

== Notes ==
GR denotes South Pacific Games record time.

^* The medal list published on the Oceania Sport Information Centre (OSIC) website as of October 2015, omits the women's 4 × 200 m freestyle relay, as marked up with a (blue background) in the table above. The result sheet for the event, however, records New Caledonia, Papua New Guinea and Northern Marianas as finishing first, second and third, respectively (with Guam in fourth). These placings are counted in the medal tally.

^† The medal list uploaded by OSIC (as at October 2015), shows not all medals were awarded for the 4 × 100 m medley and 4 × 200 m freestyle relays for men, 4 × 100 m medley relay for women. All placings are recorded in the tables above as per the original result sheets, but are marked up with a (grey background) for those finishing positions where no medal recipient is recorded. These placings are not counted in the medal tally.

^ a The 4 × 200 m Freestyle relay for men has only a gold medal winner recorded. As such, the medal tally on this page does not include silver and bronze medals for this event, although the result sheet records Guam and French Polynesia as finishing in second and third place respectively.

^ b The 4 × 100 m Medley relay for men does not have a bronze medal recipient recorded. As such, the medal tally on this page does not include a bronze for the French Polynesia team in this event, although the result sheet records them as finishing in third place.

^ c The 4 × 100 m Medley relay for women does not have a bronze medal recipient recorded. As such, the medal tally on this page does not include a bronze for the Northern Marianas team in this event, although the result sheet records them as finishing in third place.

== Sources ==
- 1999 South Pacific Games Results. Oceania Sport Information Centre (Report). Archived from the original on 28 October 2015.
- 1999 South Pacific Games Medal Lists. Oceania Sport Information Centre (Report). Archived from the original on October 29, 2015.
