= Rachel Ah Koy =

Fijian swimmer

Personal information
- Nationality: Fiji
- Born: May 31, 1989 (age 37) Suva, Fiji

Sport
- Sport: Swimming
Medal record
South Pacific Games
Gold medal – first place	2003 Suva	100m Breaststroke
Silver medal – second place	2003 Suva	50m Breaststroke
Silver medal – second place	2003 Suva	200m Breaststroke
Silver medal – second place	2003 Suva	200m I.M.
Silver medal – second place	2003 Suva	400m Free Relay
Silver medal – second place	2003 Suva	800m Free Relay
Silver medal – second place	2003 Suva	400m Medley Relay

Rachel Ah Koy (born May 31, 1989) is a Fiji Islander swimmer. She is the granddaughter of businessman, politician, and diplomat Sir James Ah Koy.

She competed in the 2002 Commonwealth Games, setting a national record in the women's 50 metres breaststroke, with a time of 34.99 sec. during the qualifiers, and a national record in the women's 100 m breaststroke heats, with a time of 1:17.33. Ah Koy also competed in the 2006 Commonwealth Games; she qualified for the semi-finals in both the 50 m and 100 m events, but failed to reach the finals.

Ah Koy won a silver medal in the women's 200m individual medley at the 2003 South Pacific Games, at the age of 14, behind New Caledonia's Diane Bui Duyet and ahead of fellow Fiji Islander Caroline Pickering. Ah Koy won gold in the women's 100m breaststroke. She also competed in the 2007 South Pacific Games, winning a silver medal in the women's 200m individual medley, behind New Caledonia's Lara Grangeon.

She was invited by the Fiji Swimming Association to seek a qualifying spot to represent Fiji at the 2008 Summer Olympics in Beijing, but declined, citing her time-consuming studies at Otago University in New Zealand.
