= Olivier Saminadin =

French swimmer

Personal information
- Nationality: France (New Caledonia)
- Born: September 6, 1977 (age 48)

Sport
- Sport: Swimming
- Strokes: Freestyle
- Club: Olympique de Nouméa Natation; Canet 66 natation (FRA)
Medal record
Representing New Caledonia
Oceania Championships
Silver medal – second place	2000 Christchurch	200 m butterfly
Bronze medal – third place	2000 Christchurch	4×200 m freestyle
Bronze medal – third place	2000 Christchurch	4×100 m medley
Pacific Games
Gold medal – first place	2003 Suva	200 m freestyle
Gold medal – first place	2003 Suva	400 m freestyle
Gold medal – first place	2003 Suva	1500 m freestyle
Gold medal – first place	2003 Suva	200 m butterfly
Gold medal – first place	2003 Suva	400 m medley
Gold medal – first place	2003 Suva	4×100 m freestyle
Gold medal – first place	2003 Suva	4×200 m freestyle
Gold medal – first place	2003 Suva	4×100 m medley
Gold medal – first place	2003 Suva	3 km open water
Gold medal – first place	2007 Apia	400 m freestyle
Gold medal – first place	2007 Apia	1500 m freestyle
Gold medal – first place	2007 Apia	400 m medley
Gold medal – first place	2007 Apia	5 km open water
Gold medal – first place	2007 Apia	4×100 m freestyle
Gold medal – first place	2007 Apia	4×200 m freestyle
Gold medal – first place	2007 Apia	4×100 m medley
Silver medal – second place	2003 Suva	200 m medley
Silver medal – second place	2003 Suva	100 m butterfly
Silver medal – second place	2007 Apia	200 m freestyle
Silver medal – second place	2007 Apia	200 m breaststroke
Silver medal – second place	2007 Apia	200 m butterfly
Silver medal – second place	2007 Apia	200 m medley
Silver medal – second place	2011 Nouméa	400 m freestyle
Bronze medal – third place	2003 Suva	100 m backstroke
Bronze medal – third place	2003 Suva	200 m backstroke
South Pacific Mini Games
Gold medal – first place	2005 Koror	200 m freestyle
Gold medal – first place	2005 Koror	400 m freestyle
Gold medal – first place	2005 Koror	1500 m freestyle
Gold medal – first place	2005 Koror	100 m backstroke
Gold medal – first place	2005 Koror	200 m backstroke
Gold medal – first place	2005 Koror	100 m butterfly
Gold medal – first place	2005 Koror	200 m medley
Gold medal – first place	2005 Koror	400 m medley
Gold medal – first place	2005 Koror	5 km open water

Olivier Saminadin (born 6 September 1977) is a French swimmer from New Caledonia. Due to New Caledonia's status as an overseas territory of France, and its current lack of official recognition by the International Olympic Committee, Saminadin (like other swimmers from New Caledonia, such as Diane Bui Duyet), swims for New Caledonia in regional (Pacific) competition, and for France in continental and above championships.

He won the inaugural 400 I.M. title at the first French Short Course Championships in January 2005.

== South Pacific Games ==
At the 1999 South Pacific Games, he set the Games Record in the men's 200 free (1:56.08).

At the 2003 South Pacific Games he won the 200, 400 and 1500 frees, the 200 fly, the 400 individual medley and the open water race; and was also part of all 3 New Caledonia's relays, each which also won.

At the 2007 South Pacific Games, he defended his titles in both 400s (free and I.M.), the 1500 and the open water race. He also set the Games Record in the 400 free (4:04.92).
