= Lacken Malateste =

Tahitian swimmer

Personal information
- Born: January 5, 1989 (age 37) Papeete, Tahiti

Sport
- Sport: Swimming
Medal record
Representing Tahiti
Pacific Games
Gold medal – first place	2003 Suva	400m individual medley
Silver medal – second place	2003 Suva	200m butterfly
Bronze medal – third place	2003 Suva	200m freestyle
Bronze medal – third place	2003 Suva	4x100m freestyle relay
Bronze medal – third place	2003 Suva	4x200m freestyle relay
Bronze medal – third place	2003 Suva	4x100m medley relay

Lacken Malateste (born January 5, 1989) is a Tahitian swimmer who has competed at the 2003 Pacific Games.

== Career ==
At the 2003 Pacific Games, she won:

- a gold medal in the 400 meters medley
- a silver medal in the 200 meters butterfly
- four bronze medals in the 200 meters freestyle relay 4 x 100 meters medley 4 (a team with Vaea Sichan, Raina Vongue and Nancy Lau), the relay 4 x 100 meters freestyle (same team) and that the relay 4 x 200 meters freestyle (same team).

She owns, since 20 July 2005, the records of Tahiti in 200-meters butterfly in 2 min 23 s 95 and 400 meters medley 4, 5 min 15 s 126. Her best performances of this same distances are 2 min 21 s 81 to 200 meters butterfly, conducted in July 2004, and 5 min 9 s 20 to 400 meters medley 4, completed in April 2005.
