= Swimming at the 2007 South Pacific Games =

- Location: Apia, Samoa
- Dates: 27 August – 3 September 2007

The swimming competition at the 2007 South Pacific Games in Apia, Samoa was held:

- pool: August 27-September 1 at the Samoa Aquatic Centre in the Faleata Sports Complex; and
- open water: Monday, September 3 at the Aggie Grey's Complex, in Faleolo.

All pool events were swum in a long-course (50m) pool; the open water events were 5-kilometres in length (5K).

== Event schedule ==
Date	Mon. Aug. 27	Tue. Aug. 28	Wed. Aug. 29	Thu. Aug. 30	Fri. Aug. 31	Sat. Sep. 1
E v e n t s	50 back (M); 100 free (W); 100 breast (M); 400 I.M. (F); 200 free (M); 4x200 Free Relay (W)	50 back (W); 100 fly (M); 200 free (W); 400 I.M. (M); 200 breast (W); 4x200 Free Relay (M)	50 breast (W); 50 breast (M); 400 free (W); 100 free (M); 100 back (W); 200 back (M); 4x100 Free Relay (W)	400 free (M); 100 fly (W); 50 fly (M); 100 breast (W); 200 breast (M); 800 free (W); 4x100 Free Relay (M)	50 free (M); 200 I.M. (W); 200 fly (M); 50 fly (W); 100 back (M); 4x100 Medley Relay (W)	200 fly (W); 200 I.M. (M); 50 free (W); 1500 free (M); 200 back (W); 4x100 Medley Relay (M)

Monday, September 3: men's and women's 5,000m Open Water swim.

Note: The 2007 swimming event schedule is the same as that of the 2003 South Pacific Games, save the nomenclature change on the relays from "400" to "4x100" and "800" to "4x200".

== Results ==
Papua New Guinea's Ryan Pini dominate the men's competition, winning eight individual gold medals. In the women's competition, Lara Grangeon from New Caledonia won seven individual gold medals (including the open water swim) and two more gold in the relays.

=== Men ===
Event	Gold		Silver		Bronze	
50m Freestyle	Gilles Dumesnil (NCL)	23.37 GR	Ryan Pini (PNG)	23.53	David Thevenot (NCL)	23.94
100m Freestyle	Ryan Pini (PNG)	50.80 GR	David Thevenot (NCL)	51.90	Christopher Duenas (GUM)	52.28
200m Freestyle	Ryan Pini (PNG)	1:50.72 GR	Olivier Saminadin (NCL)	1:54.63	David Thevenot (NCL)	1:55.96
400m Freestyle	Olivier Saminadin (NCL)	4:04.92 GR	Ryan Pini (PNG)	4:11.37	Thomas Chacun (NCL)	4:13.13
1500m Freestyle	Olivier Saminadin (NCL)	17:03.21	Thomas Chacun (NCL)	17:23.28	Heimanu Sichan (TAH)	17:30.56
50m Backstroke	Ryan Pini (PNG)	26.78	Laurent Douarche (NCL)	29.03	Julien Pierre Goyetche (NCL)	29.32
100m Backstroke	Ryan Pini (PNG)	56.96	Julien Pierre Goyetche (NCL)	1:02.17	Laurent Douarche (NCL)	1:03.79
200m Backstroke	Ryan Pini (PNG)	2:12.16	Julien Pierre Goyetche (NCL)	2:17.26	Heimanu Sichan (TAH)	2:18.82
50m Breaststroke	Rainui Teriipaia (TAH)	29.35 GR	Stéphane Debaere (TAH)	30.17	Thomas Dahlia (NCL)	30.77
100m Breaststroke	Rainui Teriipaia (TAH)	1:05.11 GR	Thomas Dahlia (NCL)	1:06.62	Stéphane Debaere (TAH)	1:06.95
200m Breaststroke	Rainui Teriipaia (TAH)	2:23.58	Olivier Saminadin (NCL)	2:23.71	Thomas Dahlia (NCL)	2:26.61
50m Butterfly	Ryan Pini (PNG)	24.55 GR	David Thevenot (NCL)	25.57	Julien Monot (NCL)	26.33
100m Butterfly	Ryan Pini (PNG)	53.46 GR	Thomas Chacun (NCL)	57.91	Laurent Douarche (NCL)	58.40
200m Butterfly	Thomas Chacun (NCL)	2:09.36	Olivier Saminadin (NCL)	2:09.43	Julien Monot (NCL)	2:26.79
200m I.M.	Ryan Pini (PNG)	2:06.22 GR	Olivier Saminadin (NCL)	2:07.27	Thomas Dahlia (NCL)	2:15.15
400m I.M.	Olivier Saminadin (NCL)	4:40.62	Jean L'Huillier (NCL)	4:53.07	Thomas Dahlia (NCL)	4:54.55
4 × 100 m Free Relay	New Caledonia; David Thevenot; Gilles Dumesnil; Thomas Dahlia; Olivier Saminadin	3:31.25 GR	(French Polynesia) Tahiti; Heimanu Sichan; Tamatoa Cowan; Tunui Cowan; Stéphane Debaere	3:37.09	Guam; Carlos Shimizu; Hernand Bonsembiante; Lucas Shimizu; Christopher Duenas	3:45.97
4 × 200 m Free Relay	New Caledonia; Thomas Chacun; David Thevenot; Olivier Saminadin; Thomas Dahlia	7:57.20 GR	(French Polynesia) Tahiti; Heimanu Sichan; Tamatoa Cowan; Tunui Cowan; Stéphane Debaere	8:11.89	Guam; Carols Shimizu; Hernand Bonsembiante; Lucas Shimizu; Christopher Duenas	8:30.70
4 × 100 m Medley Relay	New Caledonia; Olivier Saminadin; Thomas Dahlia; Thomas Chacun; David Thevenot	3:56.58 GR	(French Polynesia) Tahiti; Heimanu Sichan; Rainui Teriipaia; Tunui Cowan; Stéphane Debaere	4:01.37	Samoa; Dane Chang; Chanel Silao; Akmal Khan; Joshua Marfleet	4:18.90
5K Open Water	Olivier Saminadin (NCL)	1:05:43	Stéphane Debaere (TAH)	1:06:42	Thomas Chacun (NCL)	1:08:30

=== Women ===
Event	Gold		Silver		Bronze	
50m Freestyle	Caroline Pickering (FIJ)	26.37 GR	Armelle Hidrio (NCL)	27.30	Anna-Liza Mopio-Jane (PNG)	27.34
100m Freestyle	Caroline Pickering (FIJ)	57.20 GR	Reine-Victoria Weber (NCL)	58.80	Armelle Hidrio (NCL)	59.37
200m Freestyle	Lara Grangeon (NCL)	2:08.87 GR	Anna-Liza Mopio-Jane (PNG)	2:11.61	Delphine Bui Duyet (NCL)	2:12.57
400m Freestyle	Lara Grangeon (NCL)	4:31.96 GR	Delphine Bui Duyet (NCL)	4:45.36	Emma Hunter (SAM) Samoa	4:47.93
800m Freestyle	Lara Grangeon (NCL)	9:15.17 GR	Coralie Williams (NCL)	9:56.72	Melissa Carpin (NCL)	10:07.65
50m Backstroke	Diane Bui Duyet (NCL)	30.42	Rine-Victoria Weber (NCL)	30.55	Caroline Pickering (FIJ)	30.91
100m Backstroke	Reine-Victoria Weber (NCL)	1:03.50 GR	Caroline Pickering (FIJ)	1:07.12	Nyitrue Simon (NCL)	1:09.31
200m Backstroke	Reine-Victoria Weber (NCL)	2:20.91 GR	Lara Grangeon (NCL)	2:28.34	Caroline Pickering (FIJ)	2:42.23
50m Breaststroke	Adeline Williams (NCL)	34.00 GR	Rachel Ah Koy (FIJ)	35.12	Melissa Carpin (NCL)	35.84
100m Breaststroke	Adeline Williams (NCL)	1:13.69 GR	Rachel Ah Koy (FIJ)	1:16.46	Melissa Carpin (NCL)	1:17.35
200m Breaststroke	Adeline Williams (NCL)	2:46.00	Melissa Carpin (NCL)	2:46.56	Lara Grangeon (NCL)	2:52.36
50m Butterfly	Diane Bui Duyet (NCL)	27.51 GR	Caroline Pickering (FIJ)	28.51 NR	Reine-Victoria Weber (NCL)	28.88
100m Butterfly	Diane Bui Duyet (NCL)	1:01.30 GR	Caroline Pickering (FIJ)	1:03.65 NR	Nyitrue Simon (NCL)	1:05.44
200m Butterfly	Lara Grangeon (NCL)	2:27.80	Nyitrue Simon (NCL)	2:34.18	Coralie Williams (NCL)	2:40.73
200m I.M.	Lara Grangeon (NCL)	2:25.24 GR	Rachel Ah Koy (FIJ)	2:26.96	Anna-Liza Mopio-Jane (PNG)	2:29.44
400m I.M	Lara Grangeon (NCL)	5:05.72 GR	Coralie Williams (NCL)	5:22.95	Melissa Carpin (NCL)	5:23.34
4 × 100 m Free Relay	New Caledonia; Diane Bui Duyet; Armelle Hidrio; Reine-Victoria Weber; Lara Grangeon	4:01.72 GR	(French Polynesia) Tahiti; Dorinda Clark; Heretahi Guennegues; Vera Pambrun; Noelyn Faussane	4:27.36	none	
4 × 200 m Free Relay	New Caledonia; Diane Bui Duyet; Delphine Bui Duyet; Reine-Victoria Weber; Lara Grangeon	8:51.41 GR	(French Polynesia) Tahiti; Vera Pambrun; Noelyn Faussane; Dorinda Clark; Crystal Laughlin	9:46.75	none	
4 × 100 m Medley Relay	New Caledonia; Reine-Victoria Weber; Adeline Williams; Diane Bui Duyet; Armelle Hidrio	4:23.99 GR	(French Polynesia) Tahiti; Crystal Laughlin; Heretahi Guennegues; Vera Pambrun; Noelyn Faussane	5:07.20	none	
5K Open Water (time= hr:min:sec)	Lara Grangeon (NCL)	1:09:39	Emma Hunter (SAM) Samoa	1:15:26	Melissa Carpin (NCL)	1:15:37

== Participating countries ==
125 swimmers from 10 countries were entered in the swimming events at the 2007 Games—a record—with Tokelau and the Marshall Islands participating in the SPG Swimming events for the first time. Countries entered in the swimming competition are:

- American Samoa
- Fiji
- Guam
- New Caledonia
- Marshall Islands
- Palau
- Papua New Guinea
- Samoa
- Tahiti
- Tokelau

== Sources ==
- 2007 South Pacific Games Results. Oceania Sport Information Centre (Report). Archived from the original on 31 October 2015.
