= Anna-Liza Mopio-Jane =

Papua New Guinean swimmer

Anna-Liza Mopio Jane OLY
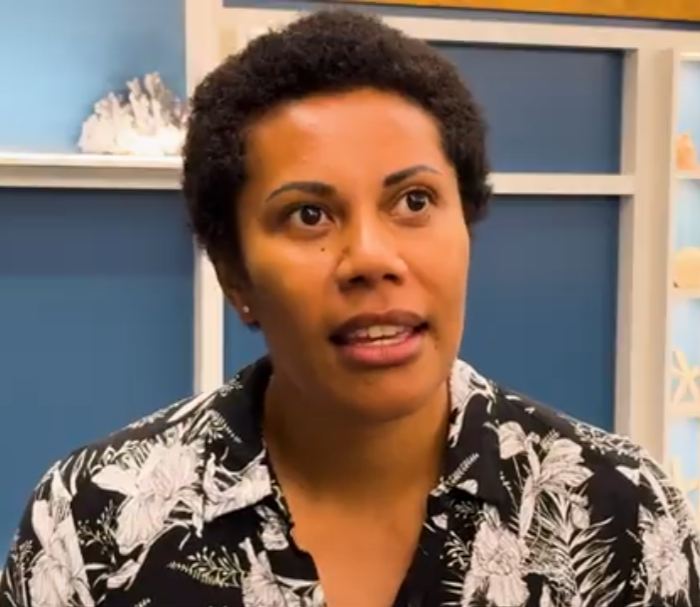
- In a 2024 interview

Personal information
- National team: Papua New Guinea
- Born: 3 December 1986 (age 39) Port Moresby, Papua New Guinea
- Height: 1.75 m (5 ft 9 in)
- Weight: 63 kg (139 lb)

Sport
- Sport: Swimming
- Strokes: Freestyle
- Club: Chandler Swim Club (AUS)
- Coach: Drew McGregor (AUS)
Medal record
Women's swimming
Representing Papua New Guinea
(South) Pacific Games
Gold medal – first place	2003 Suva	200 m freestyle
Gold medal – first place	2015 Port Moresby	4x50 m mixed free relay
Silver medal – second place	2003 Suva	50 m freestyle
Silver medal – second place	2003 Suva	100 m freestyle
Silver medal – second place	2007 Apia	200 m freestyle
Silver medal – second place	2011 Nouméa	50 m freestyle
Silver medal – second place	2011 Nouméa	200 m freestyle
Silver medal – second place	2011 Nouméa	50 m backstroke
Silver medal – second place	2011 Nouméa	100 m backstroke
Silver medal – second place	2015 Port Moresby	4x100 m medley relay
Silver medal – second place	2015 Port Moresby	4x50 m mixed medley relay
Bronze medal – third place	2003 Suva	100 m butterfly
Bronze medal – third place	2007 Apia	50 m freestyle
Bronze medal – third place	2007 Apia	200 m IM
Bronze medal – third place	2011 Nouméa	100 m freestyle
Bronze medal – third place	2011 Nouméa	200 m backstroke
Bronze medal – third place	2011 Nouméa	50 m butterfly
Bronze medal – third place	2011 Nouméa	4x100 m free relay
Bronze medal – third place	2011 Nouméa	4x200 m free relay
Bronze medal – third place	2011 Nouméa	4x100 m medley relay
Bronze medal – third place	2015 Port Moresby	50 m freestyle
Bronze medal – third place	2015 Port Moresby	4x100 m free relay
Bronze medal – third place	2015 Port Moresby	4x200 m free relay
Oceania Swimming Championships
Bronze medal – third place	2008 Christchurch	50 m freestyle

Anna-Liza Mopio-Jane (born 3 December 1986) is a Papua New Guinean swimmer, who specialized in sprint freestyle events. She represented her nation Papua New Guinea at the 2008 Summer Olympics, swimming in the 50 m freestyle. Before her retirement from competitive swimming career in 2012, Mopio-Jane trained for Chandler Swim Club in her current residence Brisbane, Queensland, Australia, under the tutelage of head coach Drew McGregor.

Mopio-Jane was invited by FINA to compete as a lone female swimmer for the Papua New Guinean squad in the 50 m freestyle at the 2008 Summer Olympics in Beijing. Swimming on the outside lane in heat six, Mopio-Jane finished nearly three tenths of a second (0.3) behind leader Rugilė Mileišytė of Lithuania, with a second-place time and lifetime best of 26.47; however, she finished outside the semifinal cut in forty-second overall.
