= Swimming at the 2003 South Pacific Games =

- Location: Suva, Fiji
- Dates: 30 June – 7 July 2003

Swimming at the 2003 South Pacific Games took place from 30 June to 7 July in Suva, the capital of Fiji.

The pool events were held on the first 6 days in the 50m (long-course) pool at Fiji's National Aquatics Centre, and a 3 kilometre ("3K") open water race was held at Pacific Harbour on Monday, July 7, 2003. Originally, a 5K open water race was to be contested – 5K being a more widely internationally accepted race distance than a 3K. However, rough conditions on-course pushed the turn markers/buoys out of position and the length of the race needed to be changed to accommodate the conditions.

Overall, Papua New Guinea's Ryan Pini (male) and New Caledonia's Diane Bui Duyet (female) were named "Swimmers of the Meet" for their overall performances: Pini won 7 events, 4 in record time and earned 12 medals overall; Bui-Duyet won 10 events with 5 games records, and 11 medals in total.

== Event schedule ==
Date	Mon. 30 June.	Tue. 1 July.	Wed. 2 July.	Thu. 3 July.	Fri. 4 July.	Sat. 5 July.
E v e n t s	50 back (M); 100 free (W); 100 breast (M); 400 I.M. (F); 200 free (M); 800 Free Relay (W)	50 back (W); 100 fly (M); 200 free (W); 400 I.M. (M); 200 breast (W); 800 Free Relay (M)	50 breast (W); 50 breast (M); 400 free (W); 100 free (M); 100 back (W); 200 back (M); 400 Free Relay (W)	400 free (M); 100 fly (W); 50 fly (M); 100 breast (W); 200 breast (M); 800 free (W); 400 Free Relay (M)	50 free (M); 200 I.M. (W); 200 fly (M); 50 fly (W); 100 back (M); 400 Medley Relay (W)	200 fly (W); 200 I.M. (M); 50 free (W); 1500 free (M); 200 back (W); 400 Medley Relay (M)

Monday, July 7: men's and women's 3,000m Open Water swim.

== Results ==
=== Men ===
Event	Gold		Silver		Bronze	
50m Freestyle	Carl Probert (FIJ)	23.61	Ryan Pini (PNG)	23.72	David Thevenot (NCL)	23.92
100m Freestyle	Ryan Pini (PNG)	51.61	Carl Probert (FIJ)	52.04	David Thevenot (NCL)	52.17
200m Freestyle	Olivier Saminadin (NCL)	1:54.47	David Thevenot (NCL)	1:54.55	Ryan Pini (PNG)	1:55.12
400m Freestyle	Olivier Saminadin (NCL)	4:11.02	Antoine Dahlia (NCL)	4:15.77	Tunui Cowan (TAH)	4:20.89
1500m Freestyle	Olivier Saminadin (NCL)		Benoit Riviere (NCL)		Fabian Dubois-Duvivier (NCL)	
50m Backstroke	Ryan Pini (PNG)	26.49 GR	Sebastien Tailhan (NCL); Carl Probert (FIJ)	29.16	none	
100m Backstroke	Ryan Pini (PNG)	56.90 GR	Sebastien Tailhan (NCL)	1:01.28	Olivier Saminadin (NCL)	1:02.99
200m Backstroke	Ryan Pini (PNG)	2:08.54	Sebastien Tailhan (NCL)	2:12.56	Olivier Saminadin (NCL)	2:13.77
50m Breaststroke	Rainui Teriipaia (TAH)	29.94	Matthew Sheehan (PNG)	30.97	Stephen Hirzel (NCL)	31.53
100m Breaststroke	Rainui Teriipaia (TAH)	1:06.43 GR	Adrien Thomas (NCL)	1:07.69	Stephen Hirzel (NCL)	1:08.97
200m Breaststroke	Rainui Teriipaia (TAH)	2:27.35	Adrien Thomas (NCL)	2:27.74	Stephen Hirzel (NCL)	2:29.61
50m Butterfly	Ryan Pini (PNG)	24.62 GR	Daniel O'Keeffe (GUM)	25.90	David Thevenot (NCL)	26.09
100m Butterfly	Ryan Pini (PNG)	55.18 GR	Olivier Saminadin (NCL)	57.34	Daniel O'Keeffe (GUM)	57.94
200m Butterfly	Olivier Saminadin (NCL)	2:09.36	Laurent Douarche (NCL)	2:12.00	Antoine Dahlia (NCL)	2:13.45
200m I.M.	Ryan Pini (PNG)	2:09.38	Olivier Saminadin (NCL)	2:10.08	Daniel O'Keeffe (GUM)	2:13.67
400m I.M	Olivier Saminadin (NCL)	4:44.23	Dean Palacios (MNP)	4:50.31	Antoine Dahlia (NCL)	4:57.99
400m Free Relay	New Caledonia; David Thevenot; Olivier Saminadin; Laurent Douarche; Antoine Dahlia	3:34.28 GR	Papua New Guinea; Leo Biggs; Matthew Sheehan; Ben Wells; Ryan Pini	3:36.26	(French Polynesia) Tahiti; Yann Lausan; Tamatoa Ellacott; Rainui Teriipaia; Tunui Cowan	3:43.11
800m Free Relay	New Caledonia; David Thevenot; Laurent Douarche; Antoine Dahlia; Olivier Saminadin	8:00.81	Papua New Guinea; Leo Biggs; Ben Wells; Matthew Sheehan; Ryan Pini	8:11.91	(French Polynesia) Tahiti; Tunui Cowan; Tamatoa Ellacott; Yann Lausan; Rainui Teriipaia	8:21.66
400m Medley Relay	New Caledonia; Sebastien Tailhan; Adrien Thomas; Olivier Saminadin; David Thevenot	3:57.89 GR	Papua New Guinea; Ryan Pini; Matthew Sheehan; Ben Wells; Leo Biggs	4:00.79	(French Polynesia) Tahiti; Tunui Cowan; Rainui Teriipaia; Tamatoa Ellacott; Yann Lausan	4:07.50
3K Open Water	Olivier Saminadin (NCL)	37:41.09	Antoine Dahlia (NCL)	38:10.37	Tunui Cowan (TAH)	38:19.37

=== Women ===
Event	Gold		Silver		Bronze	
50m Freestyle	Caroline Pickering (FIJ)	27.03	Anna-Liza Mopio-Jane (PNG)	27.11	Florence Alaux (NCL)	27.98
100m Freestyle	Caroline Pickering (FIJ)	58.95	Anna-Liza Mopio-Jane (PNG)	59.21	Diane Bui Duyet (NCL)	59.58
200m Freestyle	Anna-Liza Mopio-Jane (PNG)	2:11.03	Florence Alaux (NCL)	2:11.88	Lacken Malateste (TAH)	2:14.74
400m Freestyle	Charlotte Robin (NCL)	4:42.93	Vanessa Claubau (NCL)	4:43.99	Aurelia Dubois-Duvivier (NCL)	4:45.07
800m Freestyle	Vanessa Claubau (NCL)	9:38.09	Charlotte Robin (NCL)	9:44.58	Aurelia Dubois-Duvivier (NCL)	9:53.60
50m Backstroke	Diane Bui Duyet (NCL)	30.28 GR	Caroline Pickering (FIJ)	31.18	Marie Simon (NCL)	32.38
100m Backstroke	Diane Bui Duyet (NCL)	1:05.28 GR	Caroline Pickering (FIJ)	1:07.05	Delphine Bui Duyet (NCL)	1:10.83
200m Backstroke	Diane Bui Duyet (NCL)	2:26.58 GR	Delphine Bui Duyet (NCL)	2:30.26	Margo Boyd (NCL)	2:34.25
50m Breaststroke	Manina Tehei (NCL)	34.80 GR	Rachel Ah Koy (FIJ)	35.63	Vuki Kuinikoro (FIJ)	36.63
100m Breaststroke	Rachel Ah Koy (FIJ)	1:14.77 GR NR	Manina Tehei (NCL)	1:17.00	Melissa Carpin (NCL)	1:20.32
200m Breaststroke	Melissa Carpin (NCL)	2:46.86	Rachel Ah Koy (FIJ)	2:47.73	Manina Tehei (NCL)	2:49.84
50m Butterfly	Diane Bui Duyet (NCL)	28.42 GR	Caroline Pickering (FIJ)	30.19	Florence Alaux (NCL)	30.45
100m Butterfly	Diane Bui Duyet (NCL)	1:03.75 GR	Florence Alaux (NCL)	1:07.08	Anna-Liza Mopio-Jane (PNG)	1:08.16
200m Butterfly	Diane Bui Duyet (NCL)	2:27.38	Lacken Malateste (TAH)	2:35.06	Marie-Michelle Horngren (NCL)	2:39.58
200m I.M.	Diane Bui Duyet (NCL)	2:27.46	Rachel Ah Koy (FIJ)	2:29.79	Caroline Pickering (FIJ)	2:29.92
400m I.M	Lacken Malateste (TAH)	5:31.26	Charlotte Robin (NCL)	5:38.19	Raina Vongue (TAH)	5:40.69
400m Free Relay	New Caledonia; Florence Alaux; Diane Bui Duyet; Marie Simon; Manina Tehei	4:04.68 GR	Fiji; Caroline Pickering; Jodie Barratt; Rachel Ah Koy; Raewyn Simpson	4:10.09; NR	(French Polynesia) Tahiti; Nancy Lau; Vaea Sichan; Raina Vongue; Lacken Malateste	4:20.56
800m Free Relay	New Caledonia; Diane Bui Duyet; Florence Alaux; Charlotte Robin; Aurelia Dubois-Duvivier	9:03.13 GR	Fiji; Rachel Ah Koy; Jodie Barratt; Raewyn Simpson; Caroline Pickering	9:15.46; NR	(French Polynesia) Tahiti; Nancy Lau; Vaea Sichan; Raina Vongue; Lacken Malateste	9:35.58
400m Medley Relay	New Caledonia; Diane Bui Duyet; Melissa Carpin; Florence Alaux; Marie Simon	9:03.13 GR	Fiji; Caroline Pickering; Rachel Ah Koy; Jodie Barratt; Raewyn Simpson	9:15.46; NR	(French Polynesia) Tahiti; Lacken Malateste; Vaea Sichan; Raina Vongue; Nancy Lau	9:35.58
3K Open Water	Charlotte Robin (NCL)	38:26.71	Aurelia Dubois-Duvivier (NCL)	39:14.75	Esther Meallet (NCL)	41:59.84

== Participating countries ==
101 swimmers from 9 countries took part in the swimming competitions at the 2003 South Pacific Games (team size in parentheses):

- Guam (7)
- Fiji (17)
- Federated States of Micronesia (6)
- NCL (30)
- Northern Mariana Islands (9)
- Palau (4)
- Papua New Guinea (10)
- Samoa (6)
- Tahiti (12)
