= Ryan Pini =

Papua New Guinean swimmer

Ryan Pini MBE OLY
Personal information
- Full name: Ryan John Pini
- Nickname: PNG's Golden Fish
- Nationality: Papua New Guinea
- Born: 10 December 1981 (age 44) Port Moresby, Papua New Guinea
- Height: 1.96 m (6 ft 5 in)
- Weight: 98 kg (216 lb)

Sport
- Sport: Swimming
- Strokes: Butterfly
- Club: Yeronga Park Swim Club (AUS)
Medal record
Commonwealth Games
Gold medal – first place	Melbourne 2006	100m Butterfly
Silver medal – second place	Delhi 2010	100m Butterfly
South Pacific Games
Gold medal – first place	Agana 1999	100m Backstroke
Gold medal – first place	Suva 2003	100m Freestyle
Gold medal – first place	Suva 2003	50m Backstroke
Gold medal – first place	Suva 2003	100m Backstroke
Gold medal – first place	Suva 2003	200m Backstroke
Gold medal – first place	Suva 2003	50m Butterfly
Gold medal – first place	Suva 2003	100m Butterfly
Gold medal – first place	Suva 2003	200m I.M.
Gold medal – first place	Apia 2007	100m Freestyle
Gold medal – first place	Apia 2007	200m Freestyle
Gold medal – first place	Apia 2007	50m Backstroke
Gold medal – first place	Apia 2007	100m Backstroke
Gold medal – first place	Apia 2007	200m Backstroke
Gold medal – first place	Apia 2007	50m Butterfly
Gold medal – first place	Apia 2007	100m Butterfly
Gold medal – first place	Apia 2007	200m medley
Gold medal – first place	Nouméa 2011	200m Freestyle
Gold medal – first place	Nouméa 2011	50m Backstroke
Gold medal – first place	Nouméa 2011	100m Backstroke
Gold medal – first place	Nouméa 2011	50m Butterfly
Gold medal – first place	Nouméa 2011	100m Butterfly
Gold medal – first place	Port Moresby 2015	50m Freestyle
Gold medal – first place	Port Moresby 2015	100m Freestyle
Gold medal – first place	Port Moresby 2015	50m Backstroke
Gold medal – first place	Port Moresby 2015	100m Backstroke
Gold medal – first place	Port Moresby 2015	50m Butterfly
Gold medal – first place	Port Moresby 2015	100m Butterfly
Gold medal – first place	Port Moresby 2015	Mixed 4x50m Freestyle relay
Silver medal – second place	Agana 1999	100m Butterfly
Silver medal – second place	Suva 2003	50m Freestyle
Silver medal – second place	Suva 2003	400m Free Relay
Silver medal – second place	Suva 2003	800m Free Relay
Silver medal – second place	Suva 2003	400m Medley Relay
Silver medal – second place	Apia 2007	50m Freestyle
Silver medal – second place	Apia 2007	400m Freestyle
Silver medal – second place	Nouméa 2011	100m Freestyle
Silver medal – second place	Nouméa 2011	50m Freestyle
Silver medal – second place	Port Moresby 2015	4x100m Medley Relay
Silver medal – second place	Port Moresby 2015	Mixed 4x50m Medley Relay
Bronze medal – third place	Agana 1999	200m Backstroke
Bronze medal – third place	Suva 2003	200m Freestyle
Bronze medal – third place	Nouméa 2011	4x100m Medley
Bronze medal – third place	Port Moresby 2015	4x100m Freestyle relay
Bronze medal – third place	Port Moresby 2015	4x200m Freestyle relay

Ryan John Pini MBE OLY (born 10 December 1981 in Port Moresby, Papua New Guinea) is a 4-time Olympic swimmer from Papua New Guinea. He swam for PNG at the 2004, 2008, 2012, and 2016 Olympics; also serving as the PNG flagbearer in 2008 and 2016. He is the first PNG swimmer ever to reach an Olympic final.

Pini competes for the Boroko Swim Club.

== International career ==
=== 2002 Commonwealth Games ===
At his first ever Commonwealth Games, Pini made the semifinal in all 4 events contested (50m/100m Butterfly, 50m Freestyle and 50m Backstroke)

=== 2004 Summer Olympics ===
Pini competed in the 100m Butterfly at the 2004 Summer Olympics, finishing 18th.

=== 2006 Commonwealth Games ===
- 100m Butterfly

At the 2006 Commonwealth Games, Pini became just the second individual from Papua New Guinea to win an individual gold medal at Commonwealth Games, when he won the Men's 100m Butterfly. In doing so, Pini also won Papua New Guinea's first ever swimming medal at a Commonwealth Games. His winning time of 52.64 was enough to edge out Michael Klim of Australia and Moss Burmester of New Zealand.

Pini also competed in the final of the Men's 50m Butterfly, finishing fifth, and made the semifinal of the Men's 100m Freestyle.

=== 2007 World Aquatics Championships ===
Pini competed in the 2007 World Aquatics Championships in Melbourne.

He reached the 100m Butterfly and 50m Butterfly semifinals.

He competed in the heats of the 100m Freestyle.

=== 2008 Summer Olympics ===
Pini was the flag bearer for Papua New Guinea at the Opening Ceremony of the 2008 Summer Olympics in Beijing.

Pini ranked first in the third heat of the Men's 100m Freestyle, but did not make a qualifying time for the semifinals. He also competed in heats for the 200m Freestyle.

Pini competed in the Swimming at the 2008 Summer Olympics – Men's 100m Butterfly, where he was Papua New Guinea's most widely anticipated chance at attaining a first Olympic medal. He competed in the finals, and finished 8th overall, in a tough line up which included American big fish Michael Phelps, who took gold. Pini was the first Papua New Guinean ever to swim an Olympic final.

=== 2010 Commonwealth Games ===
- 100m Butterfly

Pini won Silver in 100m Butterfly Finals in a time of 52.50.

Pini also competed in the final of the Men's 50m Butterfly, finishing 5th in a time of 23.88.

Pini qualified for the 100m Freestyle Semifinal but had to pull out due to illness and to concentrate on the 50m Butterfly Final.

=== 2012 Summer Olympics ===
Pini competed in the 100m Butterfly at the 2012 Summer Olympics, finishing 26th.

=== 2016 Summer Olympics ===
Pini competed in the 100 m Butterfly event at the 2016 Summer Olympics in Rio de Janeiro. He finished in 30th place in the heats with a time of 53.24 seconds. He did not advance to the semifinals.

== Training ==
Pini trains under super coach Rick Van Der Zant and alongside ex Australian swimming representative Andrew Mewing. His other training partners include Jackson Van Der Zant, Sam James, Adam Hosking, and Josh Smith.

== Early life ==
Pini was born and raised in Port Moresby, Papua New Guinea and is the third youngest of four children (2 older brothers and 1 younger sister). His parents Kevin and Sarenah Pini own a family business, Theodist, based in PNG.

Pini began swimming at the age of six and attended lessons at Boroko Amateur Swimming Club. By the age of six, he held a national record for his age group (8 and under).

Graduating from Port Moresby International High School in 1999, Pini then moved to Brisbane to further his studies and to eventually pursue his swimming career.

Shoulder injuries have hindered Pini, with his fourth shoulder operation done in January 2011.

== Personal life ==
Pini married Brisbane born Carly Vincenzi in October 2011 at Stradbroke Island.

In his spare time, Pini enjoys wake boarding, kite surfing, diving and motor bike riding in PNG as well as snow boarding in Canada.

== Honours and awards ==
After his victory in the 100m Butterfly at the 2006 Commonwealth Games, Pini was ranked number one in the world for the event and held this ranking for 4 months.

Pini has also received the following awards:

- Member of the Order of the British Empire – 2005 (for services to swimming)
- Papua New Guinea SP Sportsman of the Year Award – 2003, 2004, 2005, 2011, 2015
- Papua New Guinea SP Lifetime Achievement Award – 2008
- The ONOC Male Oceania Athlete of the Year Award – 2015
- South Pacific Games Male Swimmer of the Meet – 2003 (won 7 events, 4 in Games Records)

== Career best times ==
Long course (50-metre pool)

Event	Time	Date Notes
50m Freestyle		
100m Freestyle		
200m Freestyle		
50m Butterfly		
100m Butterfly		
50m Backstroke		
100m Backstroke		

Short course (25-metre pool)

Event	Time	Date Notes
50m Freestyle		
100m Freestyle		
200m Freestyle		
50m Butterfly		
100m Butterfly		
50m Backstroke		
100m Backstroke		

== Out of the pool ==
- Sponsorships: Bank South Pacific (2011 to current), Airlines PNG (2007 to 2009)
- Ambassadors: Bank South Pacific (2011 to current), Airlines PNG (2007 to 2009)

Olympic Games
Preceded by Dika Toua; Toea Wisil	Flagbearer for Papua New Guinea; Beijing 2008; Rio de Janeiro 2016	Succeeded by Toea Wisil; Incumbent
