= Diane Bui Duyet =

French New Caledonian swimmer

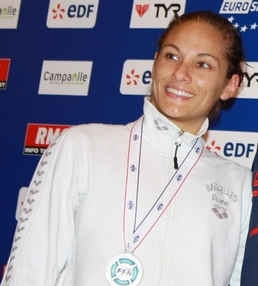

Personal information
- Nationality: France (New Caledonia)
- Born: December 22, 1979 (age 46) Nouméa, New Caledonia
- Height: 1.66 m (5 ft 5 in)

Sport
- Sport: Swimming
- Strokes: Butterfly
Medal record
Representing France
European Championships (SC)
Silver medal – second place	Rijeka 2008	100 m butterfly
Silver medal – second place	Istanbul 2009	100 m butterfly
Bronze medal – third place	Rijeka 2008	50 m butterfly
Mediterranean Games
Silver medal – second place	Pescara 2009	100 m butterfly
Representing New Caledonia
Oceania Swimming Championships
Silver medal – second place	Christchurch 2000	100 m butterfly
Bronze medal – third place	Christchurch 2000	50 m butterfly
Bronze medal – third place	Christchurch 2000	4×100 m medley
Pacific Games
Gold medal – first place	2011 Nouméa	50 m butterfly
Gold medal – first place	2011 Nouméa	100 m butterfly
Gold medal – first place	2011 Nouméa	4×100 m freestyle
Gold medal – first place	2011 Nouméa	4×100 m medley
South Pacific Games
Gold medal – first place	Suva 2003	50 m backstroke
Gold medal – first place	Suva 2003	100 m backstroke
Gold medal – first place	Suva 2003	200 m backstroke
Gold medal – first place	Suva 2003	50 m butterfly
Gold medal – first place	Suva 2003	100 m butterfly
Gold medal – first place	Suva 2003	200 m butterfly
Gold medal – first place	Suva 2003	200 m medley
Gold medal – first place	Suva 2003	4×100 m freestyle
Gold medal – first place	Suva 2003	4×200 m freestyle
Gold medal – first place	Suva 2003	4×100 m medley
Gold medal – first place	Apia 2007	50 m backstroke
Gold medal – first place	Apia 2007	50 m butterfly
Gold medal – first place	Apia 2007	100 m butterfly
Gold medal – first place	Apia 2007	4×100 m freestyle
Gold medal – first place	Apia 2007	4×200 m freestyle
Gold medal – first place	Apia 2007	4×100 m medley
Bronze medal – third place	Suva 2003	100 m freestyle

Diane Bui Duyet, sometimes spelled "Bui-Duyet", (born 22 December 1979 in Nouméa, New Caledonia) is a French New Caledonian swimmer. Due to the New Caledonia's status as an overseas territory of France, Bui Duyet competes for New Caledonia in regional (Pacific) competitions and for France in continental and above competitions (similar to Malia Metella's situation with French Guiana). At the 2007 and 2011 Pacific Games, Bui Duyet swam on several relay teams together with Lara Grangeon, who also represents both France and New Caledonia.

Bui Duyet was the world record holder in the women's short course (25 meter pool) 100 meter butterfly with a time of 55.05 seconds. She set the record in the semi-finals of the 2009 European Short Course Swimming Championships in Istanbul, Turkey. She went on to get a silver medal in the finals with a time of 55.93 seconds.

In April 2009, she set the French record in the long-course 50m butterfly (26.10), following up on her December 2008 setting of the European record in the short-course (25m) 100 fly (56.50). She also held the French record in the short-course 50 fly (25.56).

== South Pacific Games (SPGs) ==
At the 2003 South Pacific Games (SPG), Bui Duyet was named the female Swimmer of the Meet, after she won 10 events, 5 in Games Records.

2007 saw her swim at her fourth South Pacific Games. Bui Duyet had a similar performance to her one from SPG'03 at SPG'07: she won all 6 events she swam and Games Records were set in 5 of them.

She was named as one of two ambassadors for the 2011 Pacific Games which New Caledonia hosted.

Records
Preceded by (Australia) Felicity Galvez	Women's 100 metre butterfly world record holder (short course); 12 December 2009 – 7 December 2014	Succeeded by (Sweden) Sarah Sjöström
