= Lara Grangeon =

French swimmer (born 1991)

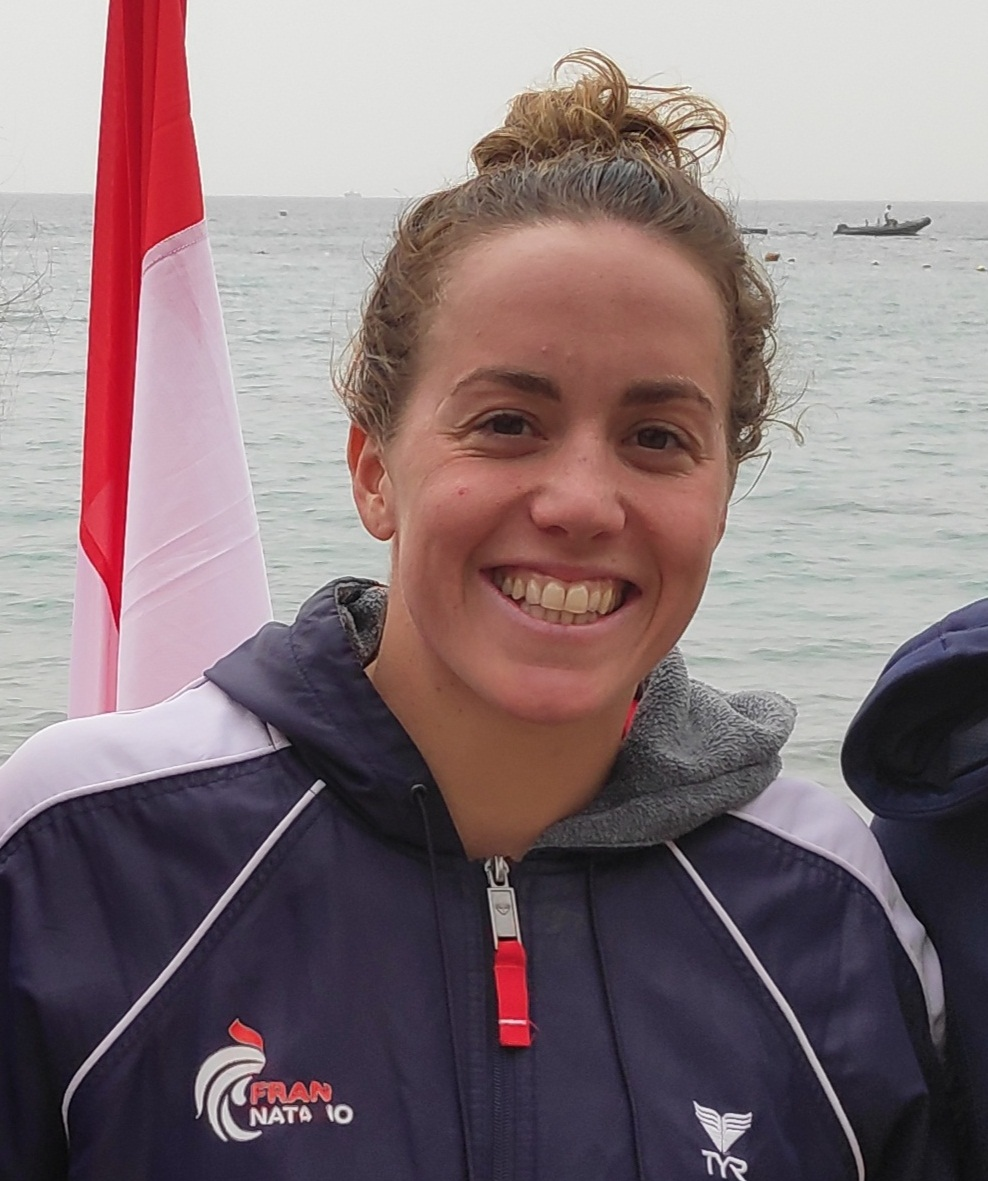
- Lara Grangeon, Eilat Israel, 31 March 2019

Personal information
- Full name: Lara Grangeon de Villèle
- National team: France; New Caledonia
- Born: 21 September 1991 (age 35) Nouméa, New Caledonia
- Height: 1.72 m (5 ft 8 in)
- Weight: 60 kg (132 lb)

Sport
- Sport: Swimming
- Strokes: Butterfly, individual medley
- Club: Cercle des Nageurs Caledoniens
Medal record
Women's swimming
Representing France
World Championships
| Bronze medal – third place | 2019 Gwangju | 25 km open water |
European Championships (LC)
| Silver medal – second place | 2020 Budapest | 25 km open water |
| Bronze medal – third place | 2018 Glasgow | 25 km open water |
| Bronze medal – third place | 2018 Glasgow | Team open water |
European Championships (SC)
| Silver medal – second place | 2015 Netanya | 200 m butterfly |
| Silver medal – second place | 2017 Copenhagen | 400 m medley |
| Bronze medal – third place | 2010 Eindhoven | 200 m medley |
| Bronze medal – third place | 2010 Eindhoven | 400 m medley |
| Bronze medal – third place | 2015 Netanya | 400 m medley |
| Bronze medal – third place | 2017 Copenhagen | 200 m butterfly |
Mediterranean Games
| Silver medal – second place | 2009 Pescara | 4×200 m freestyle |
| Bronze medal – third place | 2009 Pescara | 400 m medley |
Representing New Caledonia
Pacific Games
| Gold medal – first place | 2007 Apia | 200 m freestyle |
| Gold medal – first place | 2007 Apia | 400 m freestyle |
| Gold medal – first place | 2007 Apia | 800 m freestyle |
| Gold medal – first place | 2007 Apia | 200 m butterfly |
| Gold medal – first place | 2007 Apia | 200 m medley |
| Gold medal – first place | 2007 Apia | 400 m medley |
| Gold medal – first place | 2007 Apia | 4×100 m freestyle |
| Gold medal – first place | 2007 Apia | 4×200 m freestyle |
| Gold medal – first place | 2007 Apia | 5 km open water |
| Gold medal – first place | 2011 Nouméa | 100 m freestyle |
| Gold medal – first place | 2011 Nouméa | 200 m freestyle |
| Gold medal – first place | 2011 Nouméa | 400 m freestyle |
| Gold medal – first place | 2011 Nouméa | 800 m freestyle |
| Gold medal – first place | 2011 Nouméa | 50 m backstroke |
| Gold medal – first place | 2011 Nouméa | 100 m backstroke |
| Gold medal – first place | 2011 Nouméa | 200 m backstroke |
| Gold medal – first place | 2011 Nouméa | 100 m breaststroke |
| Gold medal – first place | 2011 Nouméa | 200 m breaststroke |
| Gold medal – first place | 2011 Nouméa | 200 m butterfly |
| Gold medal – first place | 2011 Nouméa | 200 m medley |
| Gold medal – first place | 2011 Nouméa | 400 m medley |
| Gold medal – first place | 2011 Nouméa | 4×100 m freestyle |
| Gold medal – first place | 2011 Nouméa | 4×200 m freestyle |
| Gold medal – first place | 2011 Nouméa | 4×100 m medley |
| Gold medal – first place | 2011 Nouméa | 5 km open water |
| Gold medal – first place | 2015 Port Moresby | 200 m freestyle |
| Gold medal – first place | 2015 Port Moresby | 400 m freestyle |
| Gold medal – first place | 2015 Port Moresby | 800 m freestyle |
| Gold medal – first place | 2015 Port Moresby | 200 m breaststroke |
| Gold medal – first place | 2015 Port Moresby | 100 m butterfly |
| Gold medal – first place | 2015 Port Moresby | 200 m butterfly |
| Gold medal – first place | 2015 Port Moresby | 200 m medley |
| Gold medal – first place | 2015 Port Moresby | 400 m medley |
| Gold medal – first place | 2015 Port Moresby | 4×100 m freestyle |
| Gold medal – first place | 2015 Port Moresby | 4×200 m freestyle |
| Gold medal – first place | 2015 Port Moresby | 4×100 m medley |
| Silver medal – second place | 2007 Apia | 200 m backstroke |
| Silver medal – second place | 2011 Nouméa | 50 m breaststroke |
| Silver medal – second place | 2011 Nouméa | 50 m butterfly |
| Silver medal – second place | 2011 Nouméa | 100 m butterfly |
| Bronze medal – third place | 2007 Apia | 200 m breaststroke |
| Bronze medal – third place | 2011 Nouméa | 50 m freestyle |

Lara Grangeon de Villèle (born 21 September 1991) is a French swimmer from the territory of New Caledonia who competes in the individual medley and butterfly events. At the 2012 Summer Olympics she finished 18th overall in the heats in the 400 metre individual medley and failed to reach the final.

Due to the New Caledonia's status as an overseas territory of France, Grangeon competes for New Caledonia in regional (Pacific) competitions and for France in continental and global competitions. At the 2011 Pacific Games in Nouméa, New Caledonia, Grangeon entered all twenty women's events (including one open water event) and won a medal in all of them, including sixteen golds. At the 2007 and 2011 Games, Grangeon swam on several relay teams together with Diane Bui Duyet, who also represents both France and New Caledonia.

At the 2015 European Short Course Championships in Netanya, Israel, Grangeon broke the French record in the 400 meter individual medley with a time of 4:29.14. She won the bronze medal. Earlier in 2015 at the French Championships in Limoges, she had already broken the long course French record in this event. In 2016, she again broke the long-course record, with a time of 4:36.61 at the French Championships and Olympic trials in Montpellier. At the 2016 Olympics, she competed in the 200 m butterfly and the 400 m individual medley.

She has qualified to represent France at the 2020 Summer Olympics, and competed the 10 km open water marathon.
