= Caroline Puamau =

Fijian swimmer (born 1980)

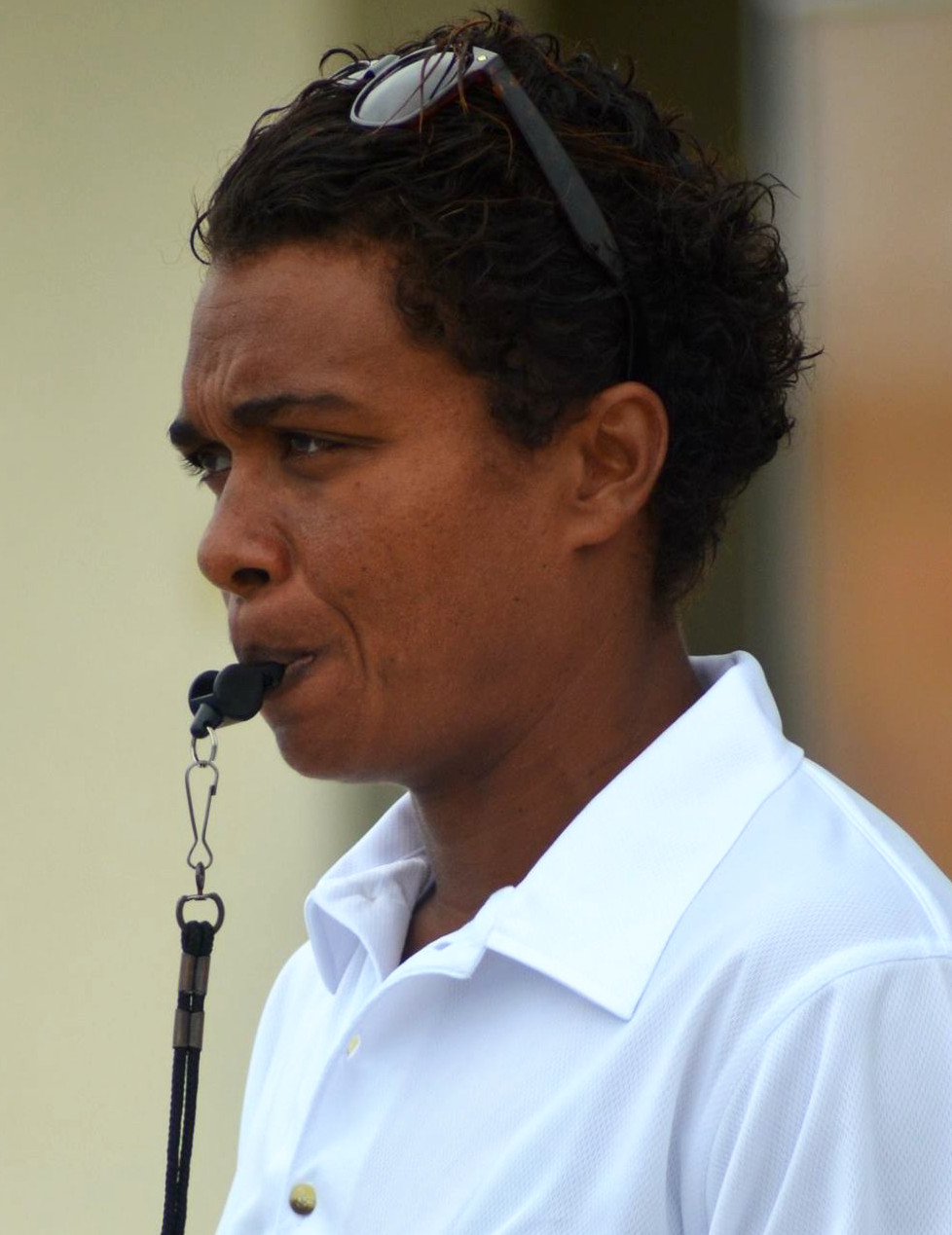

Personal information
- Full name: Caroline Pickering Puamau
- Nationality: Fiji
- Born: 1 May 1980 (age 46)

Sport
- Sport: Swimming
Medal record
(South) Pacific Games
Gold medal – first place	Suva 2003	50 m freestyle
Gold medal – first place	Suva 2003	100 m freestyle
Gold medal – first place	Apia 2007	50 m freestyle
Gold medal – first place	Apia 2007	100 m freestyle
Silver medal – second place	Suva 2003	50 m backstroke
Silver medal – second place	Suva 2003	100 m backstroke
Silver medal – second place	Suva 2003	50 m butterfly
Silver medal – second place	Suva 2003	400 m freestyle
Silver medal – second place	Suva 2003	800 m freestyle
Silver medal – second place	Suva 2003	400 m medley
Silver medal – second place	Port Moresby 2015	50 m freestyle
Silver medal – second place	Port Moresby 2015	50 m backstroke
Silver medal – second place	Port Moresby 2015	50 m butterfly
Silver medal – second place	Port Moresby 2015	4x100 m free relay
Silver medal – second place	Port Moresby 2015	4x200 m free relay
Silver medal – second place	Port Moresby 2015	4x50 m mixed free relay
Bronze medal – third place	Suva 2003	200 m individual medley
Bronze medal – third place	Port Moresby 2015	100 m freestyle

Caroline Pickering Puamau (born 1 May 1980) is a 2-time Olympic and national record-holding swimmer from Fiji. She swam at the 1996 and 2000 Olympics; as well as at the 2002 Commonwealth Games in Manchester.

She also competed in the 2003 South Pacific Games in Suva, winning two gold medals, three silver and one bronze, and in the 2007 South Pacific Games in Apia, where she won two gold medals, three silver and two bronze. She lit the cauldron during the opening ceremony at the 2003 Games.

Puamau declined to take part in the qualifiers for the 2008 Summer Olympics in Beijing, stating: "Right now I'm into coaching."
