= 2008 Oceania Swimming Championships =

The 2008 Oceania Swimming Championships were held in New Zealand and featured competition in swimming, open water swimming and synchronized swimming. It was the 7th Oceania Swimming Championships and second time that New Zealand hosted the event after playing host to the 2000 Championships.

The open water competitions were held from 3 February to 5 February near Rotorua in Lake Ōkataina and Lake Rotomā whilst the swimming and synchronized swimming competitions were carried out from 5 June to 8 June in Christchurch at the QEII Leisure Centre.

Twelve of the 13 federated members of the Oceania Swimming Association competed with the Northern Mariana Islands the only member not to send any swimmers. Two associate members also attending, bringing the total to 14: the French overseas department New Caledonia and the USA State Hawaii.

== Medal tally ==
The ranking sorts by the number of gold medals earned by a member federation (or associate member) of the Oceania Swimming Association. The number of silver medals is taken into consideration next and then the number of bronze medals. If, after the above, countries are still tied, equal ranking is given and they are listed alphabetically. The host country, New Zealand, is highlighted in lavender. The greatest number of medals won in each medal category, gold, silver, bronze, and total, is in boldface.

* Host nation (New Zealand)

Rank	Nation	Gold	Silver	Bronze	Total
1	New Zealand (NZL)*	21	17	8	46
2	Australia (AUS)	17	20	18	55
3	Papua New Guinea (PNG)	1	0	2	3
4	Hawaii (HAW)	0	0	5	5
5	New Caledonia (NCL)	0	0	4	4
6	French Polynesia (PYF)	0	0	1	1
7	American Samoa (ASA)	0	0	0	0
7	Cook Islands (COK)	0	0	0	0
7	Federated States of Micronesia (FSM)	0	0	0	0
7	Fiji (FIJ)	0	0	0	0
7	Guam (GUM)	0	0	0	0
7	Marshall Islands (MHL)	0	0	0	0
7	Northern Mariana Islands (NMI)	0	0	0	0
7	Palau (PLW)	0	0	0	0
7	Samoa (SAM)	0	0	0	0
Totals (15 entries)		**39**	**37**	**38**	**114**

== Swimming ==
A total of 38 swimming events were contested in a 50-metre pool. To give the smaller island nations a chance against the stronger swimming nations of Australia and New Zealand the championships rules stated that in the individual events only the top two qualifiers from each country progress through to the final with the third fastest swimmer only from those countries with two swimmers qualifying for the ‘A’ final permitted to swim in the ‘B’ final. In the relay events it was one medal per country. So, for example, if New Zealand 'A' finishes first, Australia 'A' finishes second, New Zealand 'B' finishes third and New Caledonia finishes fourth, New Caledonia would be awarded the bronze medal.

=== Key ===
- CR - Championship record
- NR - National record

=== Men's events ===
Event:	Gold:	Time	Silver:	Time	Bronze:	Time
Freestyle
Men's 50 m details	William Benson; New Zealand; Mark Herring; New Zealand	22.92 CR			Matthew Brooks; Australia	23.27
Men's 100 m details	Mark Herring; New Zealand	50.17	Cameron Gibson; New Zealand	50.43	Reece Turner; Australia	50.61
Men's 200 m details	Robert Hurley; Australia	1:48.84 CR	Andrew McMillan; New Zealand	1:51.14	Reece Turner; Australia	1:51.44
Men's 400 m details	Robert Hurley; Australia	3:53.56 CR	Theodore Pasialis; Australia	3:54.77	Bryn Murphy; New Zealand	4:00.81
Men's 1500 m details	Theodore Pasialis; Australia	15:27.31 CR	Kane Radford; New Zealand	15:43.87	Bryn Murphy; New Zealand	15:48.17
Backstroke
Men's 50 m details	Robert Hurley; Australia	25.64 CR	Daniel Bell; New Zealand	26.13	Bradley Byrne; Australia	26.56
Men's 100 m details	Robert Hurley; Australia	55.04 CR	Bobby Jovanovich; Australia	56.54	Gareth Kean; New Zealand	56.82
Men's 200 m details	Robert Hurley; Australia	2:01.23 CR	Cameron Stanley; New Zealand	2:02.08	John Zulch; New Zealand	2:04.35
Breaststroke
Men's 50 m details	Glenn Snyders; New Zealand	28.31 CR	James Stacey; Australia	29.03	Stephane Debaere; Tahiti	29.61
Men's 100 m details	Glenn Snyders; New Zealand	1:02.31	James Stacey; Australia	1:03.16	Dean Kent; New Zealand	1:03.92
Men's 200 m details	Glenn Snyders; New Zealand	2:16.24 CR	James Stacey; Australia	2:16.36	Kekoa Taparra; Hawaii	2:28.60
Butterfly
Men's 50 m details	Corney Swanepoel; New Zealand	23.98 CR	Chris Wright; Australia	24.32	Ryan Pini; Papua New Guinea	24.48
Men's 100 m details	Ryan Pini; Papua New Guinea	52.33 CR	Corney Swanepoel; New Zealand	52.54	Chris Wright; Australia	53.40
Men's 200 m details	Moss Burmester; New Zealand	1:58.00 CR	Chris Wright; Australia	1:59.50	Ryan Napoleon; Australia	2:02.11
Individual Medley
Men's 200 m details	Dean Kent; New Zealand	2:02.21 CR	Stephen Parkes; Australia	2:05.71	John Gatfield; New Zealand	2:07.04
Men's 400 m details	Stephen Parkes; Australia	4:30.49	Brett Newall; New Zealand	4:36.32	Bryn Murphy; New Zealand	4:41.64
Freestyle Relay
Men's 4×100 m details	Mark Herring; Orinoco Faamausili-Banse; William Benson; Cameron Gibson; New Zealand	3:19.91 CR	Reece Turner; Chris Wright; Matthew Brooks; Robert Hurley; Australia	3:22.84	? ? ? ? New Caledonia	3:35.12
Men's 4×200 m details	Ryan Napoleon; Reece Turner; Theodore Pasialis; Robert Hurley; Australia	7:25.63 CR	? ? ? ? New Zealand	7:33.29	? ? ? ? New Caledonia	8:11.72
Medley Relay
Men's 4×100 m details	Daniel Bell; Glenn Snyders; Corney Swanepoel; Cameron Gibson; New Zealand	3:38.62 CR	Robert Hurley; James Stacey; Chris Wright; Reece Turner; Australia	3:38.90	? ? ? ? New Caledonia	4:02.88

=== Women's events ===
Event:	Gold:	Time	Silver:	Time	Bronze:	Time
Freestyle
Women's 50 m details	Rebecca Ohlwein; Australia	25.84 CR	Kacey Pilgrim; Australia	26.05	Anna-Liza Mopio-Jane; Papua New Guinea	26.84
Women's 100 m details	Hayley Palmer; New Zealand	55.55 CR	Merindah Dingjan; Australia	56.27	Rebecca Ohlwein; Australia	56.54
Women's 200 m details	Helen Norfolk; New Zealand	2:00.31 CR	Lauren Boyle; New Zealand	2:00.73	Merindah Dingjan; Australia	2:02.80
Women's 400 m details	Lauren Boyle; New Zealand	4:14.29	Morgan-Lee Barnes; Australia	4:16.45	Jacinta Powell; Australia	4:16.73
Women's 800 m details	Lauren Boyle; New Zealand	8:44.06	Jacinta Powell; Australia	8:45.72	Morgan-Lee Barnes; Australia	8:51.21
Backstroke
Women's 50 m details	Elizabeth Coster; New Zealand	28.16 CR	Emily Thomas; New Zealand	28.46	Bridgette-Rose Taylor; Australia	28.50
Women's 100 m details	Elizabeth Coster; New Zealand	59.44 CR	Melissa Ingram; New Zealand	59.87	Bridgette-Rose Taylor; Australia	1:00.40
Women's 200 m details	Melissa Ingram; New Zealand	2:11.03 CR	Siobhan Keane; Australia	2:14.55	Bridgette-Rose Taylor; Australia	2:17.32
Breaststroke
Women's 50 m details	Jessica Legge; Australia	32.22 CR	Annabelle Carey; New Zealand	33.14	Kacey Pilgrim; Australia	33.76
Women's 100 m details	Jessica Legge; Australia	1:11.30	Annabelle Carey; New Zealand	1:11.53	Olivia Halicek; Australia	1:15.27
Women's 200 m details	Jessica Legge; Australia	2:34.66	Annabelle Carey; New Zealand	2:46.48	Elizabeth Matthews; Hawaii	2:47.88
Butterfly
Women's 50 m details	Amy Smith; Australia	27.46	Jessica Ash; Australia	27.92	Emily Thomas; New Zealand	28.52
Women's 100 m details	Amy Smith; Australia	59.96 CR	Elizabeth Coster; New Zealand	1:00.07 NR	Jessica Ash; Australia	1:01.29
Women's 200 m details	Amy Smith; Australia	2:09.63 CR	Jessica Ash; Australia	2:15.15	Marissa Yamamoto; Hawaii	2:32.37
Individual Medley
Women's 200 m details	Helen Norfolk; New Zealand	2:14.74 CR	Jessica Legge; Australia	2:18.37	Blair Evans; Australia	2:20.43
Women's 400 m details	Helen Norfolk; New Zealand	4:47.32 CR	Blair Evans; Australia	4:54.03	Jessica Legge; Australia	4:58.93
Freestyle Relay
Women's 4×100 m details	Olivia Halicek; Rebecca Ohlwein; Kacey Pilgrim; Merindah Dingjan; Australia	3:47.32	? ? ? ? New Zealand	4:00.19	? ? ? ? New Caledonia	4:08.03
Women's 4×200 m details	Helen Norfolk; Lauren Boyle; Hayley Palmer; Tash Hind; New Zealand	8:10.78 CR	Merindah Dingjan; Blair Evans; Jacinta Powell; Morgan-Lee Barnes; Australia	8:13.31	? ? ? ? Hawaii	9:06.10
Medley Relay
Women's 4×100 m details	Bridgette-Rose Taylor; Jessica Legge; Amy Smith; Olivia Halicek; Australia	4:09.14 CR	? ? ? ? New Zealand	4:11.68	? ? ? ? Hawaii	4:36.98

== Open Water Swimming ==
=== Men's events ===
Event:	Gold:	Time	Silver:	Time	Bronze:	Time
Men's 5 km details	Trent Grimsey; Australia	58:34.21	Kane Radford; New Zealand	59:41.30	Blake Collis; Australia	59:47.39
Men's 10 km details	Trent Grimsey; Australia	1:59:34.8	Kane Radford; New Zealand	1:59:53.2	Blake Collis; Australia	2:00:06.9

=== Women's events ===
Event:	Gold:	Time	Silver:	Time	Bronze:	Time
Women's 5 km details	Stacey Hansford; Australia	1:01:30.90	Amy Thompson; Australia	1:01:31.99	Joyce Wiegersma; New Zealand	1:06:43:55
Women's 10 km details	Amy Thompson; Australia	2:04:51.0	Stacey Hansford; Australia	2:04:51.0	Joyce Wiegersma; New Zealand	2:08:22.4

== Records broken ==
During the 2008 Oceania Swimming Championships, 42 Championship Records (or Meet Records) were set. Multiple Continental and National Records were also set.

=== Championship records ===
- Men's 50 m freestyle - Mark Herring New Zealand (22.96) (heats)
- Men's 50 m freestyle - Mark Herring New Zealand (22.92) (final)
- Men's 50 m freestyle - William Benson New Zealand (22.92) (final)
- Men's 50 m freestyle - Orinoco Faamausili-Banse New Zealand (22.86) (B final)
- Men's 100 m freestyle - Reese Turner Australia (50.61) (heats)
- Men's 100 m freestyle - Cameron Gibson New Zealand (50.36) (heats)
- Men's 100 m freestyle - Mark Herring New Zealand (49.83) (heats)
- Men's 200 m freestyle - Robert Hurley Australia (1:49.62) (heats)
- Men's 200 m freestyle - Robert Hurley Australia (1:48.84) (final)
- Men's 400 m freestyle - Robert Hurley Australia (3:53.56) (final)
- Men's 1500 m freestyle - Theodore Pasialis Australia (15:27.31) (timed final)
- Men's 50 m backstroke - Daniel Bell New Zealand (26.45) (heats)
- Men's 50 m backstroke - Robert Hurley Australia (25.64) (final)
- Men's 100 m backstroke - Robert Hurley Australia (55.04) (final)
- Men's 100 m backstroke - Robert Hurley Australia (54.91) (relay)
- Men's 200 m backstroke - Robert Hurley Australia (2:01.23) (final)
- Men's 50 m breaststroke - Glenn Snyders New Zealand (28.31) (final)
- Men's 200 m breaststroke - Glenn Snyders New Zealand (2:16.24) (final)
- Men's 50 m butterfly - Corney Swanepoel New Zealand (23.98) (final)
- Men's 100 m butterfly - Ryan Pini Papua New Guinea (52.33) (final)
- Men's 200 m butterfly - Moss Burmester New Zealand (1:58.00) (final)
- Men's 200 m individual medley - Dean Kent New Zealand (2:02.21) (final)
- Men's 4×100 m freestyle relay - Mark Herring, Orinoco Faamausili-Banse, William Benson, Cameron Gibson New Zealand (3:19.91) (timed final)
- Men's 4×200 m freestyle relay - Ryan Napoleon, Reece Turner, Theodore Pasialis, Robert Hurley Australia (7:25.63) (timed final)
- Men's 4×100 m medley relay - Daniel Bell, Glenn Snyders, Corney Swanepoel, Cameron Gibson New Zealand (3:38.62) (timed final)
- Women's 50 m freestyle - Rebecca Ohlwein Australia (26.01) (heats)
- Women's 50 m freestyle - Rebecca Ohlwein Australia (25.84) (final)
- Women's 100 m freestyle - Hayley Palmer New Zealand (55.55) (heats)
- Women's 100 m freestyle - Hayley Palmer New Zealand (55.55) (final)
- Women's 200 m freestyle - Helen Norfolk New Zealand (2:00.31) (final)
- Women's 50 m backstroke - Elizabeth Coster New Zealand (29.08) (heats)
- Women's 50 m backstroke - Elizabeth Coster New Zealand (28.89) (final)
- Women's 100 m backstroke - Elizabeth Coster New Zealand (1:02.19) (heats)
- Women's 100 m backstroke - Elizabeth Coster New Zealand (1:01.10) (final)
- Women's 200 m backstroke - Melissa Ingram New Zealand (2:11.03) (timed final)
- Women's 50 m breaststroke - Jessica Legge Australia (32.22) (timed final)
- Women's 100 m butterfly - Amy Smith Australia (59.96) (final)
- Women's 200 m butterfly - Amy Smith Australia (2:09.63) (final)
- Women's 200 m individual medley - Helen Norfolk New Zealand (2:14.74) (final)
- Women's 400 m individual medley - Helen Norfolk New Zealand (4:47.32) (timed final)
- Women's 4×200 m freestyle relay - Helen Norfolk, Lauren Boyle, Hayley Palmer, Tash Hind New Zealand (8:10.78) (timed final)
- Women's 4×100 m medley relay - Bridgette-Rose Taylor, Jessica Legge, Amy Smith, Olivia Halicek New Zealand (4:09.14) (timed final)

== See also ==
- Oceania Swimming Championship records
