= List of Oceania Championships records in swimming =

Below is a list of current Oceania Swimming Championships records as ratified by the Oceania Swimming Association.

Of the 38 events, Australia currently holds records in 21 of them, New Zealand 16 and Papua New Guinea 1.

Going into the 2010 Championships, one record set at the inaugural Championships still stood: Rebecca Brown's 2:28.24 in 200 m breaststroke. On the final night of the 2010 Championships, Australia's Rebecca Kemp broke Brown's 17-year-old record, lowering the mark to 2:26.63.

== Men's events ==
Event	Time		Name	Nationality	Date	Meet	Location	Ref
50 m freestyle	22.48	h	Daniel Hunter	New Zealand	24 June 2016	2016 Championships	Suva, Fiji	
100 m freestyle	49.49		Daniel Hunter	New Zealand	22 June 2016	2016 Championships	Suva, Fiji	
200 m freestyle	1:48.84		Robert Hurley	Australia	5 Jun 2008	2008 Championships	Christchurch, New Zealand	
400 m freestyle	3:53.56		Robert Hurley	Australia	7 Jun 2008	2008 Championships	Christchurch, New Zealand	
800 m freestyle	8:20.94		Nael Roux	Tahiti	11 May 2026	2026 Championships	Suva, Fiji	
1500 m freestyle	15:27.31		Theodore Pasialis	Australia	5 Jun 2008	2008 Championships	Christchurch, New Zealand	
50 m backstroke	25.64		Robert Hurley	Australia	6 Jun 2008	2008 Championships	Christchurch, New Zealand	
100 m backstroke	54.91	r	Robert Hurley	Australia	8 Jun 2008	2008 Championships	Christchurch, New Zealand	
200 m backstroke	2:01.23		Robert Hurley	Australia	7 Jun 2008	2008 Championships	Christchurch, New Zealand	
50 m breaststroke	28.22	h	Samuel Yalimaiwai	Fiji	10 May 2026	2026 Championships	Suva, Fiji	
100 m breaststroke	1:01.81		Jacob Story	Cook Islands	9 May 2026	2026 Championships	Suva, Fiji	
200 m breaststroke	2:15.00		Jacob Story	Cook Islands	11 May 2026	2026 Championships	Suva, Fiji	
50 m butterfly	23.98		Corney Swanepoel	New Zealand	5 Jun 2008	2008 Championships	Christchurch, New Zealand	
100 m butterfly	52.33		Ryan Pini	Papua New Guinea	7 Jun 2008	2008 Championships	Christchurch, New Zealand	
200 m butterfly	1:58.00		Moss Burmester	New Zealand	5 Jun 2008	2008 Championships	Christchurch, New Zealand	
200 m individual medley	2:01.35		Kenneth To	Australia	1 June 2012	2012 Championships	Nouméa, New Caledonia	
400 m individual medley	4:21.54	h	Nathan Capp	New Zealand	21 May 2014	2014 Championships	Auckland, New Zealand	
4×100 m freestyle relay	3:19.91		Mark Herring (50.31); Orinoco Faamausili-Banse (49.76); William Benson (49.68); Cameron Gibson (50.16)	New Zealand	7 Jun 2008	2008 Championships	Christchurch, New Zealand	
4×200 m freestyle relay	7:25.63		Ryan Napoleon (1:52.10); Reece Turner (1:50.56); Theodore Pasialis (1:52.20); Robert Hurley (1:50.77)	Australia	6 Jun 2008	2008 Championships	Christchurch, New Zealand	
4×100 m medley relay	3:38.62		Daniel Bell (56.04); Glenn Snyders (1:01.01); Corney Swanepoel (51.68); Cameron Gibson (49.89)	New Zealand	8 Jun 2008	2008 Championships	Christchurch, New Zealand	

Legend: # – Record awaiting ratification by OSA;
Records not set in finals: h – heat; r – relay 1st leg; rh – relay heat 1st leg; b – B final; so – swim-off

== Women's events ==
Event	Time	Name	Nationality	Date	Meet	Location	Ref
50 m freestyle	25.41	Ami Matsuo	Australia	23 May 2014	2014 Championships	Auckland, New Zealand	
100 m freestyle	55.18	Ami Matsuo	Australia	21 May 2014	2014 Championships	Auckland, New Zealand	
200 m freestyle	2:00.19	Ami Matsuo	Australia	20 May 2014	2014 Championships	Auckland, New Zealand	
400 m freestyle	4:10.94	Tamsin Cook	Australia	22 May 2014	2014 Championships	Auckland, New Zealand	
800 m freestyle	8:41.17	Sacha Downing	Australia	23 May 2014	2014 Championships	Auckland, New Zealand	
1500 m freestyle	17:04.21	Amelie Smith	Australia	21 April 2024	2024 Championships	Gold Coast, Australia	
50m backstroke	28.77	Gabrielle Fa'amausili	New Zealand	21 May 2014	2014 Championships	Auckland, New Zealand	
100m backstroke	1:01.10	Elizabeth Coster	New Zealand	5 Jun 2008	2008 Championships	Christchurch, New Zealand	
200m backstroke	2:11.03	Melissa Ingram	New Zealand	7 Jun 2008	2008 Championships	Christchurch, New Zealand	
50m breaststroke	31.66	Lorna Tonks	Australia	31 May 2012	2012 Championships	Nouméa, New Caledonia	
100m breaststroke	1:08.24	Lorna Tonks	Australia	30 May 2012	2012 Championships	Nouméa, New Caledonia	
200m breaststroke	2:26.63	Rebecca Kemp	Australia	26 June 2010	2010 Championships	Apia, Samoa	
50m butterfly	26.51	Brianna Throssell	Australia	20 May 2014	2014 Championships	Auckland, New Zealand	
100m butterfly	59.43	Brianna Throssell	Australia	22 May 2014	2014 Championships	Auckland, New Zealand	
200m butterfly	2:09.63	Amy Smith	Australia	5 Jun 2008	2008 Championships	Christchurch, New Zealand	
200m individual medley	2:14.74	Helen Norfolk	New Zealand	8 Jun 2008	2008 Championships	Christchurch, New Zealand	
400m individual medley	4:47.32	Helen Norfolk	New Zealand	6 June 2008	2008 Championships	Christchurch, New Zealand	
4×100m freestyle relay	3:41.75		Australia	22 May 2014	2014 Championships	Auckland, New Zealand	
4×200m freestyle relay	8:05.12		Australia	21 May 2014	2014 Championships	Auckland, New Zealand	
4×100m medley relay	4:08.92	Jenni O'Neil (?); Rebecca Kemp (?); Madeline Groves (?); Amelia Evatt-Davey (?)	Australia	26 June 2010	2010 Championships	Apia, Samoa	

Legend: # – Record awaiting ratification by OSA;
Records not set in finals: h – heat; so – swim-off

== Mixed relay ==
Event	Time		Name	Club	Date	Meet	Location	Ref
4×50 m freestyle relay	1:36.83		Grace Khelan (26.60); Hansel McCaig (22.81); David Young (22.10); Anahira McCutcheon (25.32)	Fiji	8 May 2026	2026 Championships	Suva, Fiji	
4×100 m freestyle relay	3:32.06			Australia	23 May 2014	2014 Championships	Auckland, New Zealand	
4×50 m medley relay	1:47.13	OC		New Zealand	21 May 2014	2014 Championships	Auckland, New Zealand	
4×100 m medley relay	3:54.39		Gabrielle Fa'amausili (1:02.25); Jacob Garrod (1:02.84); Helena Gasson (59.86); Daniel Hunter (49.44)	New Zealand	21 June 2016	2016 Championships	Suva, Fiji	

Legend: # – Record awaiting ratification by OSA; WR – World record; OC – Oceanian record;
Records not set in finals: h – heat; so – swim-off
