= 2012 Oceania Swimming Championships =

International swimming competition

The 9th Oceania Swimming Championships were May 28-June 3, 2012 in Nouméa, New Caledonia. The Championships featured competition in Swimming, Open Water Swimming and Synchronized Swimming. Swimming was held at the CARD Guy Verlaguet pool in Dumbéa, Synchro was held at a pool in Ouen-Toro park, and the Open Water races were swum in the waters off Baie des Citrons (5K) and Anse-Vata (10K).

The 2012 edition marks the third time that Nouméa has hosted the event, after hosting in 1993 and 2002.

== Participating nations ==
14 nations and 2 affiliated members of the Oceania Swimming Association participated in the Championships: (Note: Number listed is Swimming team sizes, unless otherwise referenced.)

- American Samoa (1)
- Australia (20)
- Cook Islands (2)
- Fiji (12)
- Hawaii (8)
- Guam (7)
- Marshall Islands (2)
- Federated States of Micronesia (2)
- New Caledonia (24)
- New Zealand (12)
- Northern Mariana Islands (1)
- Palau (2)
- Papua New Guinea (6)
- Samoa (4)
- Tahiti (1)
- Tonga (3)

== Competition schedule ==
Date	Monday; 28 May	Tuesday; 29 May	Wednesday; 30 May	Thursday; 31 May	Friday; 1 June	Saturday; 2 June
S w i m m i n g		50 fly 200 free 100 back 200 fly 1500 free (men)	50 back 100 free 100 breast 400 IM; 4×200 free relay	50 breast 400 free 100 fly 200 back 4×100 free relay	800 free (women); 200 IM; 50 free 200 breast 4×100 medley relay	
Open; Water	5K					10K
Synchro			Solo technique Duet technique Figures (juniors)	Solo free	Duet free	

== Results ==
=== Swimming ===
A total of 40 swimming events were contested in a long course (50m) pool. Similar to other international competitions, each nation was allowed to have only 2 swimmers advance through to a final in any individual event (additional swimmers could advance into the B final, or empty lanes, put were considered exhibition). In the relay events it was one medal per country. So, for example, if New Zealand 'A' finishes first, Australia 'A' finishes second, New Zealand 'B' finishes third and New Caledonia finishes fourth, New Caledonia would be awarded the bronze medal.

Key

- CR - Championship record
- NR - National record

==== Men's events ====
Event	Gold		Silver		Bronze	
50m freestyle	Kyle Richardson; Australia	22.83; CR	Cameron Simpson; New Zealand	23.18	Ryan Pini; Papua New Guinea	23.56
100m freestyle	Kenneth To; Australia	50.08	Ryan Pini; Papua New Guinea	51.28	Daniel Lester; Australia	51.53
200m freestyle	Kenneth To; Australia	1:50.32	Thomas Dahlia (France) New Caledonia	1:54.76	Ewan Jackson; New Zealand	1:55.70
400m freestyle	Declan Potts; Australia	3:55.23	Trent Grimsey; Australia	4:01.68	Isaac Foote; New Zealand	4:01.69
1500m freestyle	Jarrod Poort; Australia	15:30.68	Trent Grimsey; Australia	15:32.39	Isaac Foote; New Zealand	16:01.21
50m backstroke	Ben Edmonds; Australia	26.54	Kurt Crosland; New Zealand	26.72	Ryan Pini; Papua New Guinea	26.95
100m backstroke	Kurt Crosland; New Zealand	56.52	Ben Edmonds; Australia	57.15	Ryan Pini; Papua New Guinea	58.43
200m backstroke	Ben Edmonds; Australia	2:03.12	Kurt Crosland; New Zealand	2:03.40	Benjamin Gillies; New Zealand	2:04.90
50m breaststroke	Amini Fonua; Tonga	28.80	Nikolas Pregelj; Australia	29.29	Nicholas Schafer; Australia	29.74
100m breaststroke	Thomas Dahlia (France) New Caledonia	1:03.27	Nicholas Schafer; Australia	1:03.29	Nikolas Pregelj; Australia	1:04.02
200m breaststroke	Nicholas Schafer; Australia	2:16.67	Thomas Dahlia (France) New Caledonia	2:16.70	Nikolas Pregelj; Australia	2:18.19
50m butterfly	Ryan Pini; Papua New Guinea	24.41	Daniel Lester; Australia	24.45	Amini Fonua; Tonga	24.93
100m butterfly	Daniel Lester; Australia	53.45	Kenneth To; Australia	53.74	Ryan Pini; Papua New Guinea	53.87
200m butterfly	Declan Potts; Australia	1:59.06	Daniel Lester; Australia	2:02.32	Alan Botrel (France) New Caledonia	2:14.29
200m I.M.	Kenneth To; Australia	2:01.35 CR	Daniel Lester; Australia	2:05.25	Carsten Corazza; New Zealand	2:06.27
400m I.M.	Carsten Corazza; New Zealand	4:26.02	Kenneth To; Australia	4:30.35	Matthew Glassford; New Zealand	4:36.55
4 × 100 m free relay	Australia; Kyle Richardson (49.83); Kenneth To (49.56)); Daniel Lester (53.20); Declan Potts (52.12)	3:24.71	New Zealand; Ewan Jackson (53.33); Kurt Crosland (54.51); Carsten Corazza (51.94); Cameron Simpson (52.14)	3:31.92	New Caledonia; Benoit Riviere (54.46); Julien Monot (?); Hugo Lemerre-Desprez (?); Thomas Dahlia (?)	3:35.87
4 × 200 m free relay	Australia; Declan Potts (1:52.05); Kyle Richardson (1:52.43); Kenneth To (1:52.59); Rhys Mainstone (1:57.69)	7:34.76	New Zealand; Ewan Jackson (1:54.57); Carsten Corazza (1:53.34); Isaac Foote (1:57.90); Troy Balvert (1:59.56)	7:45.37	New Caledonia; Thomas Dahlia (1:56.99); Benoit Riviere (2:02.00); Emmanuel Limozin (2:00.77); Léo Cherriffa (2:00.71)	8:00.47
4 × 100 m medley relay	Australia; Ben Edmonds, Nicholas Schafer, Daniel Lester, Kyle Richardson	3:44.88	New Zealand; Kurt Crosland, Matthew Glassford, Carsten Corazza, Cameron Simpson	3:49.60	New Caledonia; Arthur Funfschilling, Thomas Dahlia, Alan Botrel, Benoit Riviere	4:03.13

==== Women's events ====
Event	Gold		Silver		Bronze	
50m freestyle	Ami Matsuo; Australia	26.00	Nicole Mee; Australia	26.82	Armelle Hidrio (France) New Caledonia	27.02
100m freestyle	Ami Matsuo; Australia	56.17	Amy Levings; Australia	57.62	Emma Terebo (France) New Caledonia	58.50
200m freestyle	Ami Matsuo; Australia	2:02.67	Maëva Parayre (France) New Caledonia	2:10.57	Matelita Buadromo; Fiji	2:10.82
400m freestyle	Amy Levings; Australia	4:16.50	Emily Seymour; Australia	4:32.12	Lena Hayakawa; Hawaii	4:40.13
800m freestyle	Jordan White; Australia	8:48.99	Leah Cutting; Australia	9:00.23	Lena Hayakawa; Hawaii	9:40.75
50m backstroke	Grace Loh; Australia	29.65	Jordan White; Australia	30.39	Emma Terebo (France) New Caledonia	30.80
100m backstroke	Mikkayla Sheridan; Australia	1:03.45	Grace Loh; Australia	1:03.63	Emma Terebo (France) New Caledonia	1:05.70
200m backstroke	Mikkayla Sheridan; Australia	2:14.06	Jordan White; Australia	2:15.30	Emma Terebo (France) New Caledonia	2:23.85
50m breaststroke	Lorna Tonks; Australia	31.66 CR	Jessican Hansen; Australia	33.13	Pilar Shimizu; Guam	34.45
100m breaststroke	Lorna Tonks; Australia	1:08.24 CR	Jessican Hansen; Australia	1:10.32	Pilar Shimizu; Guam	1:16.19
200m breaststroke	Jessican Hansen; Australia	2:32.57	Lorna Tonks; Australia	2:36.86	Lena Hayakawa; Hawaii	2:46.92
50m butterfly	Nicole Mee; Australia	27.67	Lorna Tonks; Australia	28.23	Armelle Hidrio (France) New Caledonia	28.67
100m butterfly	Nicole Mee; Australia	1:01.41	Lorna Tonks; Australia	1:01.61	Yasmine Ware; Hawaii	1:06.35
200m butterfly	Jordan White; Australia	2:13.83	Nicole Mee; Australia	2:13.85	Lena Hayakawa; Hawaii	2:31.96
200m I.M.	Amy Levings; Australia	2:18.91	Mikkayla Sheridan; Australia	2:18.97	Aja Grande; Hawaii	2:26.54
400m I.M.	Amy Levings; Australia	4:51.37	Leah Cutting; Australia	4:56.93	Yasmine Ware; Hawaii	5:23.77
4 × 100 m free relay	Australia; Ami Matsuo (56.59); Jordan White (58.62); Mikkayla Sheridan (56.88); Amy Levings (57.31)	3:49.40	New Caledonia; Maëva Parayre (1:00.77); Armelle Hidrio (59.35); Delphine Bui Duyet (1:01.34); Emma Terbro (58.71)	4:00.17	Hawaii; Yasmine Ware (1:01.02); Aja Grande (1:00.44); Bryee Nihipali (1:04.70); Lena Hayakawa (1:01.70)	4:07.86
4 × 200 m freestyle relay	Australia; Amy Levings (2:05.70); Mikkayla Sheridan (2:04.02); Jordan White (2:07.10); Ami Matsuo (2:06.06)	8:22.88	New Caledonia; Emma Terbro (2:10.87); Armelle Hidrio (2:17.99); Delphine Bui Duyet (2:12.44); Maëva Parayre (2:13.55)	8:54.85	Hawaii; Aja Grande (2:16.93); Lena Hayakawa (2:14.99); Bryee Nihipali (2:28.46); Yasmine Ware (2:18.76)	9:19.14
4 × 100 m medley relay	Australia; Mikkayla Sheridan, Lorna Tonks, Nicole Mee, Ami Matsuo	4:15.09	Hawaii; Bryee Nihipali, Lena Hayakawa, Yasmine Ware, Aja Grande	4:33.75	New Caledonia; Emma Terebo, Lauriane Santa, Maëva Parayre, Armelle Hidrio	4:35.79

==== Mixed event ====
Event	Gold		Silver		Bronze	
4×100 m freestyle relay	Australia; Declan Potts (53.22); Amy Levings (58.22); Grace Loh (1:00.60); Ben Edmonds (53.64)	3:45.68	New Caledonia; Alix Barrois (1:03.92); Léo Cherriffa (57.98); Déborah Cronsteadt (1:04.75); Hugo Lemerre-Desprez (55.55)	4:02.20	New Caledonia; Julie Rouam-Sim (1:03.83); Arthur Funfschilling (56.35); Adele Simon (1:05.13); Marcus Meozzi (56.98)	4:02.29
4×100 m medley relay	Australia; Grace Loh (1:04.86); Nikolas Pregelj (1:03.68); Daniel Lester (55.55); Ami Matsuo (57.70)	4:01.79	New Caledonia; Nicolas Oswald (1:05.15); Maroma Bong (1:17.55); Adele Simon (1:09.43); Hugo Lemerre-Desprez (54.49)	4:26.62	New Caledonia; Emmanuel Limozin (1:04.55); Lauriane Santa (1:18.35); Théo Jambet (1:00.62); Julie Rouam-Sim (1:03.57)	4:27.09

=== Open Water Swimming ===
==== Men ====
Event	Gold		Silver		Bronze	
5K	Rhys Mainstone; Australia	57:05.60	Trent Grimsey; Australia	57:10.94	Isaac Foote; New Zealand	1:01:38.12
10K	Trent Grimsey; Australia	1:58:13.00	Rhys Mainstone; Australia	2:00:41.00	Troy Balvert; New Zealand	2:02:30.00

==== Women ====
Event	Gold		Silver		Bronze	
5K	Leah Cutting; Australia	1:03:25.21	Emily Seymour; Australia	1:04:13.95	Charlotte Robin (France) New Caledonia	1:09:02.09
10K	Melissa Gorman; Australia	2:01:46.00	Emily Seymour; Australia	2:10:56.00	Charlotte Robin (France) New Caledonia	2:25:30.00

=== Medal tally ===
Rank	Nation	Gold	Silver	Bronze	Total
1	Australia	35	25	4	64
2	New Zealand	2	6	5	13
3	New Caledonia	1	7	14	22
4	Papua New Guinea	1	1	4	6
5	Tonga	1	0	1	2
6	Hawaii	0	1	9	10
7	Guam	0	0	2	2
8	Fiji	0	0	1	1
Totals (8 entries)		40	40	40	120

Note: Swimming-only currently listed (Australia with 64 total).

== See also ==
- List of Oceania Championships records in swimming
