= 2004 Oceania Swimming Championships =

International aquatics competition

The 2004 Oceania Swimming Championships were held May 15–19, 2004 at the National Aquatics Center in Suva, Fiji. This was the fifth edition of the Championships, and featured competitions in: swimming, open water swimming and synchronized swimming (synchro). The synchro competition marked the first time the sport had been swum in Fiji.

All swimming competition listed below were swum in a 50m (long-course) pool.

== Participating countries ==
The 2004 Oceania Swimming Championships featured 134 swimmers from 11 countries, and the USA State of Hawaii:

- American Samoa (4)
- Australia (35)
- Federated States of Micronesia (2)
- Fiji (10)
- Guam (4)
- Hawaii (4)
- New Caledonia (24)
- New Zealand (41)
- Northern Mariana Islands (2)
- Palau (1)
- Papua New Guinea (3)
- Tahiti (4)

== Event schedule ==
Date	May 15	May 16	May 17	May 18	May 19
S w i m *	200 free (M); 50 breast (W); 200 fly (W); 50 back (M); 400 IM (W); 400 IM (M); 400 free relay (M); 800 free relay (W)	100 fly (M); 100 free (W); 100 breast (M); 100 back (W); 50 free (M); 200 breast (W); 400 free (M); 50 fly (W); 200 back (M); 800 free relay (M); 800 free (W)	50 back (W); 50 breast (M); 200 fly (M); 400 free (W); 400 free relay (W)	100 back (M); 100 breast (W); 100 fly (W); 100 free (M); 50 free (W); 200 breast (M); 200 back (W); 200 IM (M); 200 IM (W); 50 fly (M); 200 free (W); 400 medley relay (M); 400 medley relay (W); 1500 free (M)	
Open; Water			5-kilometer (5K)		10-kilometer (10K)
Synchro		Junior Figures; Senior Technical Solo		Junior Duet; Senior Free Solo; Senior Technical Duet	Junior Solo; Senior Free Duet; Free Routine Combination

- (*) Semifinals were held in the events 50 and 100 in length. 50 semifinals were held the same evening as their final; 100 semifinals were held the evening before the final.

== Results ==
=== Swimming ===
==== Men ====
Event	Gold		Silver		Bronze	
50m Freestyle	Carl Probert; Fiji	23.44	Gilles Dumesnil; New Caledonia	23.70	Andrew Lauterstein; Australia	23.79
100m Freestyle	Leith Brodie; Australia	51.59	Andrew Lauterstein; Australia	51.63	Carl Probert; Fiji	52.03
200m Freestyle	Josh Krogh; Australia	1:51.81 CR	Andrew Thompson; Australia	1:52.19	Ephraim Hannant; Australia	1:52.64
400m Freestyle	Josh Krogh; Australia	3:55.68 CR	Brendon Hughes; Australia	3:56.92	Andrew Thompson; Australia	3:58.95
1500m Freestyle	Josh Krogh; Australia	15:37.66	Andrew Thompson; Australia	15:39.71	Ephraim Hannant; Australia	15:44.14
50m Backstroke	Ryan Pini; Papua New Guinea	26.83 CR	Scott Talbot-Cameron; New Zealand	27.06	Michael Jackson; Australia	27.31
100m Backstroke	Andrew Lauterstein; Australia	56.86	Andrew Burns; Australia	57.51	Ryan Pini; Papua New Guinea	57.81
200m Backstroke	Andrew Burns; Australia	2:01.77 CR	Michael Jackson; Australia	2:05.46	Leith Brodie; Australia	2:06.11
50m Breaststroke	Mark Riley; Australia	28.82 CR	Rainui Teriipaia (French Polynesia) Tahiti	29.34	James Beasley; Australia	29.50
100m Breaststroke	Mark Riley; Australia	1:03.34	James Beasley; Australia	1:03.85	Rainui Teriipaia (French Polynesia) Tahiti	1:05.08
200m Breaststroke	Mark Riley; Australia	2:17.80	James Beasley; Australia	2:18.66	Richard Adamson; New Zealand	2:22.95
50m Butterfly	Corney Swanepoel; New Zealand	24.25	Ryan Pini; Papua New Guinea	24.84	Andrew Lauterstein; Australia	25.17
100m Butterfly	Corney Swanepoel; New Zealand	53.30 CR	Ryan Pini; Papua New Guinea	54.06	Andrew Lauterstein; Australia	54.89
200m Butterfly	Josh Krogh; Australia	1:59.49 CR	Andrew Richards; Australia	2:00.20	Brendon Hughes; Australia	2:02.47
200m I.M.	Dean Kent; New Zealand	2:04.79	Mitchell Bacon; Australia	2:05.14	Leith Brodie; Australia	2:07.08
400m I.M	Mitchell Bacon; Australia	4:26.41	Dean Kent; New Zealand	4:27.55	Michael Jackson; Australia	4:29.94
400m Free Relay	Australia	3:25.97	New Zealand	3:30.12	New Caledonia	3:43.82
800m Free Relay	Australia	7:31.34 CR	New Zealand	7:47.10	New Caledonia	8:26.81
400m Medley Relay	Australia	3:44.71 CR	New Zealand	3:48.87	Fiji	4:09.56

==== Women ====
Event	Gold		Silver		Bronze	
50m Freestyle	Danni Miatke; Australia	26.37	Alison Fitch; New Zealand	26.80	Sally Foster; Australia	26.90
100m Freestyle	Alison Fitch; New Zealand	57.54	Danni Miatke; Australia	57.62	Alicia Coutts; Australia	57.80
200m Freestyle	Lara Davenport; Australia	2:02.78	Briody Murphy; Australia	2:02.91	Haylee Reddaway; Australia	2:03.29
400m Freestyle	Briody Murphy; Australia	4:12.91 CR	Stephanie Williams; Australia	4:17.77	Helen Norfolk; New Zealand	4:22.62
800m Freestyle	Briody Murphy; Australia	8:42.22 CR	Stephanie Williams; Australia	8:44.19	Haylee Reddaway; Australia	8:50.59
50m Backstroke	Elizabeth Coster; New Zealand	30.14 CR	Karina Leane; Australia	30.18	Danni Miatke; Australia	30.50
100m Backstroke	Karina Leane; Australia	1:03.90	Stephanie Williams; Australia	1:04.33	Stephanie Rice; Australia	1:04.56
200m Backstroke	Stephanie Williams; Australia	2:14.58 CR	Karina Leane; Australia	2:16.22	Shannon Clayton; New Zealand	2:18.89
50m Breaststroke	Jade Edmistone; Australia	32.43 CR	Sally Foster; Australia	32.46	Chelsea Nagata; Hawaii	35.62
100m Breaststroke	Jade Edmistone; Australia	1:09.96 CR	Sally Foster; Australia	1:10.37	Kelly Bentley; New Zealand	1:16.47
200m Breaststroke	Sally Foster; Australia	2:32.70	Jade Edmistone; Australia	2:34.67	Helen Norfolk; New Zealand	2:39.95
50m Butterfly	Danni Miatke; Australia	27.33 CR	Elizabeth Coster; New Zealand	28.01	Georgina Toomey; New Zealand	28.06
100m Butterfly	Elizabeth Coster; New Zealand	1:00.95	Stephanie Rice; Australia	1:01.09	Danni Miatke; Australia	1:01.49
200m Butterfly	Alicia Coutts; Australia	2:17.96	Lara Davenport; Australia	2:18.99	Nathalie Bernard; New Zealand	2:21.16
200m I.M.	Alicia Coutts; Australia	2:16.92 CR	Helen Norfolk; New Zealand	2:17.57	Stephanie Rice; Australia	2:19.51
400m I.M	Helen Norfolk; New Zealand	4:52.78	Stephanie Rice; Australia	4:56.09	Kelly Bentley; New Zealand	5:03.99
400m Free Relay	New Zealand	3:50.86	Australia	3:51.09	New Caledonia	4:13.44
800m Free Relay	Australia	8:18.37 CR	New Zealand	8:27.41	New Caledonia	9:21.64
400m Medley Relay	Australia	4:14.35 CR	New Zealand	4:18.87	New Caledonia	4:49.88

=== Open Water medalist ===
Event	Gold		Silver		Bronze	
Men's 5K	Hayden Jackson; Australia	59:05	Jarrad Nederpelt; Australia	1:00:46.49	Daniel Ryan; New Zealand	1:02:22.36
Men's 10K	Jarrad Nederpelt; Australia	2:03:59.45	Hayden Jackson; Australia	2:07:40.20	Benoit Riviere; New Caledonia	2:16:22.05
Women's 5K	Shannon Clayton; New Zealand	1:04:49.35	Nichole Hunter; Australia	1:04:49.48	Vanessa Clabau; New Caledonia	1:09:21.38
Women's 10K	Nichole Hunter; Australia	2:15:28.39	Vanessa Clabau; New Caledonia	2:23:31.02	not awarded	

=== Synchro medalists ===
Event	Gold		Silver		Bronze
Junior—Solo	Bobi-Rose Leatherby; New Zealand		Verity Leach; New Zealand		Sarah Morris; Australia
Junior—Duet	Kelly Andrews; Tamika Domrow; Australia	65.940	Samantha Reid; Candice Wood; Australia	64.352	not awarded
Open—Solo	Lisa Daniels; New Zealand	77.834	Laure Algayres; New Caledonia	71.250	not awarded
Open—Duet	Lisa Daniels; Nina Daniels; New Zealand		not awarded		not awarded
Free Routine; Combination	New Zealand		Australia		New Caledonia

== Overall medal table ==
Rank	Nation	Gold	Silver	Bronze	Total
1	Australia (AUS)	33	30	20	83
2	New Zealand (NZL)	12	11	9	32
3	Papua New Guinea (PNG)	1	2	1	4
4	Fiji (FIJ)	1	0	2	3
5	New Caledonia (NCL)	0	3	8	11
6	French Polynesia (TAH)	0	0	2	2
7	Hawaii (HAW)	0	0	1	1
Totals (7 entries)		47	46	43	136
