= 2000 Oceania Swimming Championships =

The 2000 Oceania Swimming Championships were held 21–24 June 2000 at the Queen Elizabeth II pool in Christchurch, New Zealand. This was the third edition of the Championships, and swimming all competition listed below was conducted in a 50m (long-course) pool.

== Event schedule ==
Date	21 June	22 June	23 June	24 June
E v e n t s	50 fly (W+M); 100 breast (W+M); 100 free (W+M); 400 I.M. (W+M); 400 Free Relay (M+W)	50 breast (W+M); 400 free (W+M); 100 fly (W+M); 200 back (W+M); 800 Free Relay (W)	50 back (W+M); 200 free (W+M); 200 breast (W+M); 200 I.M. (W+M); 800 Free Relay (M)	50 free (W+M); 200 fly (W+M); 100 back (W+M); 800 free (W); 1500 free (M); 400 Medley Relay (W+M)

== Results ==
=== Men ===
Event	Gold		Silver		Bronze	
50m Freestyle	Jonathan Van Hazel; Australia	23.63	Jared Clarke; Australia	23.85	Kaine Love; Australia	24.03
100m Freestyle	Jonathan Van Hazel; Australia	51.88	Kaine Love; Australia	52.08	Jared Clarke; Australia	52.10
200m Freestyle	Danyon Loader; New Zealand	1:53.45; CR	Kaine Love; Australia	1:53.85	Nic Williams; Australia	1:55.91
400m Freestyle	Jonathan Duncan; New Zealand	4:00.49; CR	Danyon Loader; New Zealand	4:00.94	Andrew Affleck; Australia	4:03.99
1500m Freestyle	Jonathan Duncan; New Zealand	15:57.26	John Flanagan; Hawaii	16:00.11	Andrew Affleck; Australia	16:01.02
50m Backstroke	Shane Fielding; Australia	27.41	Edward Roche; Australia	27.63	Scott Talbot-Cameron; New Zealand	27.71
100m Backstroke	Cameron Gibson; New Zealand	58.06	Edward Roche; Australia	58.11	Scott Talbot-Cameron; New Zealand	58.15
200m Backstroke	Andrew Burns; Australia	2:05.64	Adam Lucas; Australia	2:06.12	Scott Talbot-Cameron; New Zealand	2:06.28
50m Breaststroke	Steven Ferguson; New Zealand	30.16	Ben Eales; Australia	30.17	Brian Christensen; Australia	30.32
100m Breaststroke	Ben Tuckerman; Australia	1:04.88	Steven Ferguson; New Zealand	1:05.27	Simon Leighfield; Australia	1:05.37
200m Breaststroke	Ben Tuckerman; Australia	2:21.33	Simon Leighfield; Australia; Steven Ferguson; New Zealand	2:21.36	none	
50m Butterfly	Nicholas Sheeran; New Zealand	25.17	Jason Cohen; Australia	25.64	Shane Fielding; Australia	25.68
100m Butterfly	Shane Fielding; Australia	55.17; CR	Nicholas Sheeran; New Zealand	55.33	Jason Cohen; Australia	55.88
200m Butterfly	Matthew Hall; Australia	2:01.38; CR	Nicholas Sheeran; New Zealand	2:02.83	Dean Kent; New Zealand	2:03.17
200m I.M.	Dean Kent; New Zealand	2:04.57; CR	Shane Fielding; Australia	2:07.04	Michael Coyne; Australia	2:07.42
400m I.M	Dean Kent; New Zealand	4:28.80	Olivier Saminadin; New Caledonia	4:32.85	Matthew Dodds; New Zealand	4:33.32
400m Free Relay	Australia A Jonathan Van Hazel; Kaine Love; Nathan Taylor; Jared Clarke	3:27.89	Australia B Scott Sabotic; Nic Williams; Ben Eales; Shane Fielding	3:30.09	New Zealand A Scott Cameron; Dean Kent; Cameron Gibson; Danyon Loader	3:32.85
800m Free Relay	Australia A Nathan Taylor; Nic Williams; Shane Fielding; Kaine Love	7:37.30; CR	New Zealand A Scott Cameron; Jonathan Duncan; Dean Kent; Danyon Loader	7:41.11	New Caledonia; Antoine Dahlia; David Thevenot; Cedric Petre; Olivier Saminadin	8:11.53
400m Medley Relay	Australia A Edward Roche; Ben Tuckerman; Shane Fielding; Jonathan Van Hazel	3:48.82	New Zealand A Cameron Gibson; Steven Ferguson; Nicholas Sheeran; Danyon Loader	3:49.07	New Caledonia; Antoine Dahlia; Olivier Saminadin; Cedric Petre; David Thevenot	4:04.70

=== Women ===
Event	Gold		Silver		Bronze	
50m Freestyle	Michelle Engelsman; Australia	26.56	Toni Jeffs; New Zealand	26.61	Melinda Geraghty; Australia	26.95
100m Freestyle	Monique Robins; New Zealand	57.59	Joy Symons; Australia	57.81	Deanna Schonwald; New Zealand	58.45
200m Freestyle	Deanna Schonwald; New Zealand	2:03.58; CR	Heidi Crawford; Australia	2:04.85	Amanda Pascoe; Australia	2:04.89
400m Freestyle	Amanda Pascoe; Australia	4:20.46; CR	Deanna Schonwald; New Zealand	4:21.72	Brooke Townsend; Australia	4:21.78
800m Freestyle	Tammie Smith; Australia	8:55.16; CR	Brooke Townsend; Australia	8:55.58	Amanda Pascoe; Australia	8:56.83
50m Backstroke	Monique Robins; New Zealand	30.33; CR	Caroline Pickering unattached	30.49	Jessica Abbott; Australia	30.56
100m Backstroke	Kelly Tucker; Australia	1:04.08; CR	Monique Robins; New Zealand	1:04.46	Taryn Callaghan; Australia	1:05.37
200m Backstroke	Kelly Tucker; Australia	2:15.69; CR	Helen Norfolk; New Zealand	2:16.01	Taryn Callaghan; Australia	2:18.98
50m Breaststroke	Sarah Kasoulis; Australia	34.08	Katie Clewett; Australia	34.31	Kate Young; Australia	34.56
100m Breaststroke	Kate Young; Australia	1:12.76	Sarah Kasoulis; Australia	1:12.96	Katie Clewett; Australia	1:13.94
200m Breaststroke	Kate Young; Australia	2:33.48	Sarah Kasoulis; Australia	2:39.43	Jolie Workman; New Zealand	2:41.32
50m Butterfly	Shelley McGuirk; Australia	27.89	Carmen Cosgrove; Australia	28.41	Diane Bui Duyet; New Caledonia	28.48
100m Butterfly	Shelley McGuirk; Australia	1:02.48	Diane Bui Duyet; New Caledonia	1:03.10	Rachel Coffee; Australia	1:03.11
200m Butterfly	Heidi Crawford; Australia	2:15.67	Yvette Rodier; Australia	2:16.59	Megan Allan; New Zealand	2:16.94
200m I.M.	Helen Norfolk; New Zealand	2:19.20; CR	Yvette Rodier; Australia	2:20.61	Georgie Bartlett; Australia	2:21.33
400m I.M	Yvette Rodier; Australia	4:49.68	Helen Norfolk; New Zealand	4:54.49	Elizabeth Van Welie; New Zealand	4:55.04
400m Free Relay	Australia A Melinda Geraghty; Michelle Engelsman; Jessica Abbott; Joy Symons	3:53.45	Australia B Heidi Crawford; Brooke Townsend; Amanda Pascoe; Carmen Cosgrove	3:55.46	New Zealand A Deanna Schonwald; Helen Norfolk; Nathalie Bernard; Jolie Workman	3:57.52
800m Free Relay	Australia A Heidi Crawford; Amanda Pascoe; Tammie Smith; Joy Symons	8:24.69; CR	New Zealand; Deanna Schonwald; Helen Norfolk; Nathalie Bernard; Elizabeth Van Welie	8:31.75	New Caledonia; Florence Alaux; Charlotte Robin; Aurelia Dubois-Duvivier; Laurence Grangeon	9:09.10
400m Medley Relay	Australia A Kelly Tucker; Kate Young; Shelley McGuirk; Joy Symons	4:16.63; CR	New Zealand A Monique Robins; Jolie Workman; Rachel Jenkins; Deanna Schonwald	4:20.80	New Caledonia; Diane Bui Duyet; Laurence Grangeon; Florence Alaux; Aurelia Dubois-Duvivier	4:43.49

== Participating countries ==
- Australia
- Guam
- Hawaii
- New Caledonia
- New Zealand
- Northern Mariana Islands
- Palau
- Papua New Guinea
- Tahiti
- unattached swimmers from Fiji
