= Faamausili =

Faamausili or Fa'amausili is a Samoan surname. Notable people with the surname include:

- Gabrielle Fa'amausili (born 1999), New Zealand swimmer
- Orinoco Faamausili-Banse (born 1990), New Zealand swimmer
- Poasa Faamausili (born 1996), New Zealand rugby league player
