= Pilar Shimizu =

Guamanian swimmer

Personal information
- Born: May 27, 1996 (age 30) Tamuning, Guam
- Height: 1.68 m (5 ft 6 in)
- Weight: 61 kg (134 lb)

Sport
- Sport: Swimming
- Club: Tarakito Swim Club, Guam
- Coached by: Pepe Laflamme
Medal record
Women's swimming
Representing Guam
Pacific Games
Silver medal – second place	2015 Port Moresby	50 m breaststroke
Silver medal – second place	2015 Port Moresby	100 m breaststroke
Oceania Championships
Bronze medal – third place	2010 Apia	100 m breaststroke
Bronze medal – third place	2012 Nouméa	50 m breaststroke
Bronze medal – third place	2012 Nouméa	100 m breaststroke

Pilar Shimizu (born May 27, 1996 in Tamuning, Guam) is a Guamanian breaststroke swimmer. While qualifying for the 2012 Summer Olympics she broke the 20-year-old national record set by Tammie Kaae, another Olympian from Guam. At these Olympics she became the youngest Olympian ever from Guam at age 16. She finished 42nd in the 100 meter breaststroke event and did not advance to the semifinals. Shimizu also competed in the 2016 Summer Olympics. Internationally, Shimizu has earned three bronze medals at the Oceania Games and two silver medals at the Pacific Games.

== Early life and education ==
Pilar Shimizu was born in the Guamanian city of Tamuning, Guam on May 27, 1996. She attended Saint Thomas Aquinas Catholic High School. Shimizu learned to swim at age four and started training at age seven.

Shimizu is studying public health at Johns Hopkins University, with a goal of working in public health administration.

== Collegiate career ==
Shimizu swam for Johns Hopkins University for two seasons, from 2013 to 2015. During her freshman season, she was part of the 200 yard medley relay team that won the Bluegrass Mountain Conference Championship and the NCAA championship. The team received First Team All-America honors as well, and holds the school record, with a time of 1:41.94.

In her second season, the 200 yard medley team took home bronze at the Bluegrass Mountain Conference Championship, and competed for the NCAA Championship.

== Olympic career ==
Shimizu participated in the 2012 Summer Olympics in London at the age of 16. She was the youngest Guamanian Olympian in history at the time of competition. Shimizu established the national record for the 100 meter breaststroke (set 20 years prior by Tammie Kaee) during the Games, with a time of 1:15.76. Shimizu placed 42nd in the event.

After swimming for Johns Hopkins for two years, Shimizu decided to train with a private club that would better prepare her for the Olympics. Shimizu competed in the 100 meter breaststroke during the 2016 Summer Olympics in Rio, with the goal of setting a personal and national record. She held the Guamanian national record for the event at the time of competition. She finished her event with a time of 1:16.65, which was not sufficient to advance. She set a personal best for the year, but did not surpass the national record. Shimizu said that although this was her second Olympics, she was just as nervous as the first time.

Following the 2016 Olympiad, Shimizu returned to Guam and was a project coordinator at the Guam Coalition Against Sexual Assault and Family Violence. Her project was to increase infrastructure for sexual assault victims in colleges in the Pacific. Shimizu decided to put her swimming career on hiatus while she finishes her degree. She volunteers at a summer camp as a swimming instructor.

== International career ==
Shimizu's first international appearance was at the 2009 East Asian Games. Her first international success came in 2010, when she won the first medal for Guam at the Oceania Swimming Championships, a bronze in the 100 meter at the age of 14. Two years later, she won two more bronze medals, in the 50 meter and 100 meter events.

In the 2015 Pacific Games, Shimizu earned the 50 meter silver medal with a time of 33.35. She also earned a silver medal in the 100 meter breaststroke, with a time of 1:16.05. Adeline Williams won the 100 meter breaststroke with a Pacific Games record time of 1:11.05.
