= Colin Herring =

New Zealand swimmer (born 1953)

Personal information
- Nationality: New Zealand
- Born: 1 March 1953 (age 73) Auckland, New Zealand
- Height: 1.88 m (6 ft 2 in)

Sport
- Sport: Swimming
- Strokes: Freestyle

Colin Herring (born 1 March 1953) is a New Zealand swimmer. He competed in two events at the 1972 Summer Olympics and is New Zealand Olympian number 280.

Herring attended the University of Alabama and was part of the 800 freestyle relay that earned Alabama's first All- America honors at the NCAA Championship alongside Leo French, Jim LaMontagne and Jeff Wade.

At the 1972 Summer Olympics, Herring placed 22nd (equal) in the 100 metre freestyle in a time of 54.41 and 26th in the 200 metre freestyle in a time of 2:00.29.

His son Mark swam for New Zealand at the 2008 Summer Olympics.
