= 2014 Oceania Swimming Championships =

The 10th Oceania Swimming Championships were held 20–23 May 2014, at the Westwave Aquatic Centre in Auckland, New Zealand. It was the tenth edition of the biennial championships, and featured competition in swimming, open water swimming and synchronized swimming. The open water events were held 11–12 January 2014, in Lake Taupō.

== Participating countries ==
Countries with confirmed teams for the 2014 Oceania Swimming Championships were:

- Australia
- Cook Islands
- Fiji
- Guam
- Hawaii
- Marshall Islands
- New Caledonia
- New Zealand
- Northern Mariana Islands
- Palau
- Papua New Guinea
- Samoa
- Tahiti
- Tonga

== Event schedule ==
| Date | Tuesday; 20 May | Wednesday; 21 May | Thursday; 22 May | Friday; 23 May |
| Swimming | 50 fly 200 free 100 back 200 fly 1500 free (men); 4x50 free mixed relay 4 × 100 medley mixed relay | 400 IM; 50 back 100 free 100 breast 4x50 medley mixed relay 4×200 free relay | 50 breast 400 free 100 fly 200 back 4×100 free relay | 4x100 free mixed relay 800 free (women); 200 IM; 50 free 200 breast 4 × 100 medley relay |
| Synchro | Noon-3 pm | | Noon-3 pm | Noon-4 pm |

== Results ==
=== Swimming ===
==== Men ====
| Event | Gold | | Silver | | Bronze | |
|---|---|---|---|---|---|---|
Men's freestyle
| 50 m | Cameron Simpson; New Zealand | 22.79; CR | Nielsen Varoy; New Zealand | 23.39 | Blake Jones; Australia | 23.41 |
| 100 m | Kyle Chalmers; Australia | 50.71 | Steven Kent; New Zealand | 50.84 | Blake Jones; Australia | 51.18 |
| 200 m | Matthew Stanley; New Zealand | 1:49.76 | Steven Kent; New Zealand | 1:49.84 | Damian Fyfe; Australia | 1:53.32 |
| 400 m | Matthew Stanley; New Zealand | 3:53.95 | Ewan Jackson; New Zealand | 3:55.13 | Damian Fyfe; Australia | 3:58.86 |
| 1500 m | Nathan Capp; New Zealand | 15:38.72 | Mathew Myers; New Zealand | 15:58.87 | Joshua Parrish; Australia | 16:06.86 |
Men's backstroke
| 50 m | Nicholas Groenewald; Australia | 26.60 | Nicholas Brown; Australia | 27.14 | Makoa Alvarez; Hawaii | 27.22 |
| 100 m | Nicholas Groenewald; Australia | 56.68 | Makoa Alvarez; Hawaii | 59.14 | William Clark; Fiji | 1:00.93 |
| 200 m | Nicholas Groenewald; Australia | 2:03.56 | Bradlee Ashby; New Zealand | 2:07.30 | Kensuke Kimura; Northern Mariana Islands | 2:18.04 |
Men's breaststroke
| 50 m | Ben Walsh; New Zealand | 29.22 | Grayson Bell; Australia | 29.57 | Jake Baggaley; Australia | 29.91 |
| 100 m | Ben Walsh; New Zealand | 1:02.81 | Julian Layton; New Zealand | 1:03.05 | Jake Baggaley; Australia | 1:05.18 |
| 200 m | Julian Layton; New Zealand | 2:15.44 | Alex Peach; New Zealand | 2:18.22 | Jake Baggaley; Australia | 2:21.23 |
Men's butterfly
| 50 m | Kyle Chalmers; Australia | 24.35 | Nielsen Varoy; New Zealand | 24.65 | Dominic Richardson; Australia | 24.95 |
| 100 m | Nicholas Brown; Australia | 54.07 | Shaun Burnett; New Zealand | 55.44 | Dominic Richardson; Australia | 55.52 |
| 200 m | Shaun Burnett; New Zealand | 1:59.23 | Nicholas Brown; Australia | 2:00.31 | Isaac Foote; New Zealand | 2:02.37 |
Men's individual medley
| 200 m | Bradlee Ashby; New Zealand | 2:04.07 | Jake Baggaley; Australia | 2:05.01 | Nicholas Groenewald; Australia | 2:06.71 |
| 400 m | Nathan Capp; New Zealand | 4:26.24 | Mathew Myers; New Zealand | 4:28.26 | Bradlee Ashby; New Zealand | 4:28.67 |
Men's relays
| 4 × 100 m freestyle | New Zealand | 3:23.62 | Australia | 3:26.66 | Hawaii | 3:33.69 |
| 4 × 200 m freestyle | Australia | 7:34.84 | New Zealand | 7:47.56 | New Caledonia | 7:54.00 |
| 4 × 100 m medley | Australia | 3:43.91 | New Zealand | 3:44.16 | Hawaii | 3:56.68 |

==== Women ====
| Event | Gold | | Silver | | Bronze | |
|---|---|---|---|---|---|---|
Women's freestyle
| 50 m | Ami Matsuo; Australia | 25.41; CR | Brianna Throssell; Australia | 25.44 | Gabrielle Fa'amausili; New Zealand | 25.86 |
| 100 m | Ami Matsuo; Australia | 55.18; CR | Chelsea Gillett; Australia | 55.86 | Samantha Lucie-Smith; New Zealand | 55.88 |
| 200 m | Ami Matsuo; Australia | 2:00.19; CR | Samantha Lucie-Smith; Australia | 2:00.70 | Shayna Jack; Australia | 2:01.45 |
| 400 m | Tamsin Cook; Australia | 4:10.94; CR | Sacha Downing; Australia | 4:11.59 | Samantha Lucie-Smith; New Zealand | 4:17.91 |
| 800 m | Sacha Downing; Australia | 8:41.17; CR | Moesha Johnson; Australia | 8:52.60 | Tiarana Mitchell; Fiji | 10:39.88 |
Women's backstroke
| 50 m | Gabrielle Fa'amausili; New Zealand | 28.77; CR | Bobbi Gichard; New Zealand | 29.16 | Lucy McJannett; Australia | 29.43 |
| 100 m | Laura Quilter; New Zealand | 1:02.13 | Caroline Baddock; New Zealand | 1:02.26 | Amy Forrester; Australia | 1:04.05 |
| 200 m | Amy Forrester; Australia | 2:14.17 | Caroline Baddock; New Zealand | 2:16.06 | Bobbi Gichard; New Zealand | 2:17.45 |
Women's breaststroke
| 50 m | Beckie Dooley; New Zealand | 33.63 | Cara Jernigan; Hawaii | 33.96 | Jane Ip; New Zealand | 34.19 |
| 100 m | Beckie Dooley; New Zealand | 1:12.49 | Jane Ip; New Zealand | 1:13.41 | Madison Balish; Hawaii | 1:14.23 |
| 200 m | Abbie Johnston; New Zealand | 2:38.78 | Beckie Dooley; New Zealand | 2:38.94 | Cara Jernigan; Hawaii | 2:39.63 |
Women's butterfly
| 50 m | Brianna Throssell; Australia | 26.51; CR | Laura Quilter; New Zealand | 27.02 | Sophia Batchelor; New Zealand | 27.84 |
| 100 m | Brianna Throssell; Australia | 59.43; CR | Samantha Lee; New Zealand | 59.74 | Laura Quilter; New Zealand | 1:00.88 |
| 200 m | Samantha Lee; New Zealand | 2:13.39 | Tamsin Cook; Australia | 2:14.95 | Helena Gasson; New Zealand | 2:16.06 |
Women's individual medley
| 200 m | Tash Hind; New Zealand | 2:17.24 | Helena Gasson; New Zealand | 2:19.73 | Lucy McJannett; Australia | 2:20.26 |
| 400 m | Tash Hind; New Zealand | 4:51.46 | Helena Gasson; New Zealand | 4:56.37 | Lena Hayakawa; Hawaii | 5:16.64 |
Women's relays
| 4 × 100 m freestyle | Australia | 3:41.75; CR | New Zealand | 3:44.90 | Fiji | 4:03.28 |
| 4 × 200 m freestyle | Australia | 8:05.12; CR | New Zealand | 8:09.71 | Hawaii | 9:05.70 |
| 4 × 100 m medley | New Zealand | 4:09.51 | Australia | 4:16.19 | Hawaii | 4:33.42 |

==== Mixed events ====
| Event | Gold | | Silver | | Bronze | |
|---|---|---|---|---|---|---|
| 4×50 m freestyle relay | Australia | 1:37.40; CR | New Zealand | 1:37.53 | Fiji | 1:43.37 |
| 4×50 m medley relay | New Zealand | 1:47.13; CR | Australia | 1:48.57 | New Zealand | 1:50.19 |
| 4×100 m freestyle relay | Australia | 3:32.06; CR | New Zealand | 3:32.07 | New Caledonia | 3:46.84 |
| 4×100 m medley relay | New Zealand | 3:55.46; CR | Australia | 3:55.68 | Hawaii | 4:12.12 |

== Overall medal table ==
| Rank | Nation | Gold | Silver | Bronze | Total |
|---|---|---|---|---|---|
| 1 | New Zealand (NZL) | 21 | 26 | 10 | 57 |
| 2 | Australia (AUS) | 20 | 13 | 15 | 48 |
| 3 | Hawaii (HAW) | 0 | 2 | 9 | 11 |
| 4 | Fiji (FJI) | 0 | 0 | 4 | 4 |
| 5 | New Caledonia (NCL) | 0 | 0 | 2 | 2 |
| 6 | Northern Mariana Islands (NMI) | 0 | 0 | 1 | 1 |
| Totals (6 entries) | | 41 | 41 | 41 | 123 |
