= Scott Talbot =

Swimmer and swimming coach

Personal information
- Full name: Scott Thomas Talbot
- Nationality: Australia
- Born: 13 July 1981 (age 45) Canberra, Australia
- Relatives: Don Talbot (father); Jan Cameron (mother)

Sport
- Sport: Swimming
- Strokes: Backstroke
Medal record
Oceania Swimming Championships
Bronze medal – third place	Christchurch 2000	200 m Backstroke

Scott Thomas Talbot, also Talbot-Cameron (born 13 July 1981) is an Australian-born swimmer and swimming coach who represented New Zealand in swimming from 1997 to 2006 and has worked as a coach in several countries.

== Early life ==
Talbot is the son of Don Talbot and Jan Cameron (née Murphy), both national head coaches; his mother was also an Australian Tokyo Olympics silver medalist in 1964. Born in Canberra, Australia, he followed his parents to Canada, then back to Australia, then moved with his mother to New Zealand at the age of ten. He attended Rosmini College in Auckland and Auburn University in the US state of Alabama, and graduated from Massey University in Albany, New Zealand with a BA in Psychology.

== Swimming career ==
He swam for New Zealand, for which he was a national record holder, at the 2000 and 2004 Olympics.

Talbot also swam at the:

- 2006 Commonwealth Games
- 2005 World Championships,
- 2004 Summer Olympics,
- 2004 Oceania Swimming Championships,
- 2003 World Student Games
- 2002 Pan Pacs,
- 2000 Summer Olympics,
- 2000 Oceania Swimming Championships,
- 1999 Pan Pacs
- 1999 Short Course Worlds, and
- 1997 Oceania Swimming Championships.

At the 2003 Student Games, he was the swimming team captain and broke the National Record in the 100m backstroke in finishing 5th.

== Coaching career ==
Talbot began coaching swimming professionally at North Shore Swim Club in 2003, from junior through to senior levels, and was a New Zealand national coach in the High Performance Centre based in the Millennium Institute in Auckland. In 2013 he became senior coach for the swimming team at the University of Sydney. He attended the 2012 London Olympics as a national coach for New Zealand.

In 2013, he moved back to Australia to work as the Head Middle Distance Coach at the University of Sydney, and in 2016 he was appointed as the High Performance Coach at the Nunawading Swimming Club in Melbourne.

In September 2020, he became director and head coach of Repton School and swimming club, before taking up a position at Swimming Canada as head performance coach at the High Performance Centre Vancouver in 2022.

== Personal life ==
Talbot is married to Lucy and has 2 daughters.
