= Robert Hurley (swimmer) =

Australian swimmer

Personal information
- Full name: Robert Hurley
- Nickname: Bobby
- Nationality: Australia
- Born: 26 September 1988 (age 37) Melbourne, Victoria, Australia
- Height: 1.94 m (6 ft 4 in)
- Weight: 86 kg (190 lb)

Sport
- Sport: Swimming
- Strokes: Freestyle, Backstroke
- Club: Warringah Aquatic Swimming Club
- Coach: Tim Lane
Medal record
Event	1st	2nd	3rd
World Championships (LC)	0	0	1
World Championships (SC)	2	2	1
Oceania Swimming C'ships	6	2	0
Total	8	4	2
World Championships (LC)
Bronze medal – third place	2009 Rome	4×200 m freestyle
World Championships (SC)
Gold medal – first place	2008 Manchester	4×200 m freestyle
Gold medal – first place	2012 Istanbul	50 m backstroke
Silver medal – second place	2012 Istanbul	4×200 m freestyle
Silver medal – second place	2016 Windsor	4×100 m medley
Bronze medal – third place	2012 Istanbul	4×100 m medley

Robert "Bobby" Hurley (born 26 September 1988) is an Australian swimmer and former World Record holder in the short-course (25 metre pool) 50 metres Backstroke and 2012 World Champion in the same event. In 2009 he won a bronze medal as a team member on the 4 × 200 m Freestyle relay at the FINA World Championships in Rome. He has five FINA World Championship medals to his name, two gold, one silver and two bronze.

Hurley is a sprint backstroke and middle and distance freestyle specialist and was an Australian Institute of Sport scholarship holder 2007–2009. In 2017, Hurley transitioned into the coaching ranks where he led South African Olympic Champions Chad le Clos and Cameron van der Burgh to Gold and Bronze medals respectively, at the 2017 FINA World Swimming Championships in Budapest.

== Career ==
=== Background ===
Hurley was born in Mornington, VIC and is the youngest of three children. His family moved to Wollongong, NSW where he attended high school at The Illawarra Grammar School.

=== Early career ===
At the 2007 Junior Pan Pacific Championships in Maui, Hurley won 2 Gold in the 4 × 100 m Freestyle Relay, 4 × 200 m Freestyle Relay and 1 Silver in the 200m Freestyle. He also placed 4th in the 100m Freestyle, 6th in the 50m Freestyle, and won the B Final of the 400m Freestyle.

==== 2008 Olympic Trials ====
At the 2008 Olympic Trials in Sydney, Hurley had a few near misses at making his first Olympic Team. Hurley placed 3rd in the 400m Freestyle behind Grant Hackett and Craig Stevens, 4th in the 200m Backstroke, 5th in the 100m Backstroke, and 4th in the non-selection 50m Backstroke.

==== FINA World Championships (25m), Manchester ====
At the 2008 FINA World Championships (25m) in Manchester, England, Hurley competed in six events and picked up a gold medal in the 4 × 200 m Freestyle Relay as a heat swimmer. He also placed 8th in the 100m Backstroke final, and was the youngest swimmer in the field.

2008 World Championships (25m)
Event	Time	Place
4 × 200 m Freestyle Relay (heat swimmer)	6:55.65	Gold
4 × 100 m Medley Relay (heat swimmer)	3:27.51	4th
100m Backstroke	51.19	8th
50m Backstroke	24.09	14th
200m Backstroke	1:54.31	12th
400m Freestyle	3:48.19	13th

At the 2008 Oceania Championships in Christchurch, New Zealand, Hurley had a breakout meet. Here he won 8 medals, 6 Gold (200m, 400m Freestyle, 50m, 100m, 200m Backstroke, 4 × 200 m Freestyle Relay) and 2 Silver (4 × 100 m Freestyle Relay, 4 × 100 m Medley Relay), also placed 4th in the 100m Freestyle and broke 8 Championship Records.

At the 2008 Australian Short Course Championships in Melbourne, Hurley showcased his dominance winning 6 medals, including 5 gold, and extended his range all the way to the 1500m Freestyle. He is the only person to win medals across every distance at an Australian Championships.

At the 2008 FINA World Cup (25m), Hurley shot to fame after breaking the short course World Record in the 50m Backstroke in his hometown of Sydney, Australia, in a time of 23.24. Hurley also broke the Australian Record in the 100m Backstroke at the Singapore stop of the World Cup in a time of 50.28, narrowly missing Ryan Lochte's World Record of 49.99. Hurley went on to compete at the Moscow, Stockholm and Berlin stops of the World Cup, winning 17 medals in total (5 Gold) and placed 4th in the overall standings with 85 points.

=== 2009-2012 ===
At the 2009 Australian Championships in Sydney, Hurley won his first long course Australian title on the first day in the 400m Freestyle. His winning time of 3:46.64 moved him into fourth on the Australian All-Time Rankings only behind Olympic Greats Ian Thorpe, Grant Hackett and Kieren Perkins. He also finished with silver in the 1500m Freestyle, bronze in the 100m and 200m Backstrokes and 4th in the 200m Freestyle, to secure selection on the Australian Swimming Team.

==== FINA World Championships, Rome ====
At the 2009 FINA World Championships in Rome, Italy, Hurley competed in 5 events and won a bronze medal in the 4 × 200 m Freestyle Relay Final with teammates Kenrick Monk, Tommaso D'Orsogna and Patrick Murphy. Hurley swam the second leg in 1:46.47. The Australian quartet broke the Commonwealth and Australian Records in a time of 7:01.65, a record that still stands. The race was won in World Record time by Team USA led by Michael Phelps and Ryan Lochte, closely followed by Russia. Hurley also very narrowly missed individual finals in the 400m (11th) and 800m Freestyle events (10th).

2009 World Championships
Event	Time	Place
4 × 200 m Freestyle Relay	7:05.56	Bronze
800m Freestyle	7:50.65	10th
400m Freestyle	3:46.01	11th
1500m Freestyle	15:14.75	14th
100m Backstroke	55.18	32nd

At the 2009 Australian Short Course Championships in Hobart, Hurley continued his short course dominance winning 5 medals, gold in the 50m, 100m Backstroke and 800m Freestyle, and bronze in the 200m and 400m Freestyle.

At the 2009 FINA World Cup (25m) Hurley won 4 medals across three stops. At the Stockholm stop of the World Cup, Hurley broke the Australian Record in the 100m Backstroke in a time of 50.19. At the Berlin stop, Hurley placed 3rd in the 400m Freestyle in a time of 3:38.35 which was the 3rd fastest time ever by an Australian. The race was won in World Record time by Germany's Paul Biedermann in 3:32.77. At the Singapore stop, Hurley defeated Olympic Champion Oussama Mellouli in the 1500m Freestyle in a time of 14:32.47, the third fastest time ever by an Australian.

At the 2010 Australian Championships in Sydney, Hurley defended his 400m Freestyle title and added two more national championships in the 800m and 1500m Freestyle events. He came close to being just the sixth Australian to break the 15 minute barrier in the 1500m Freestyle, winning the event by 14 seconds in a time of 15:00.96. He also won the 400m and 1500m Freestyle events at the 2010 Australian Short Course Championships in Brisbane, taking his tally of National Titles to 14.

At the 2010 Pan Pacific Championships in Irvine, California, Hurley finished 4th in the 800m Freestyle, 7th in the 400m Freestyle, and 10th in the 1500m Freestyle. At the 2010 Commonwealth Games in Delhi, India, Hurley suffered food poisoning in the athletes village, and missed finals of the 400m Freestyle.

Hurley won two gold medals at the 2011 Australian Short Course Championships in Adelaide, and two gold at the 2011 FINA World Cup.

==== 2012 Olympic Trials ====
At the 2012 Olympic Trials in Adelaide, Hurley finished 3rd in the 400m Freestyle for the second consecutive Olympic Trials, one spot short of Olympic selection. In the 200m Freestyle, where top 6 are selected for the 4 × 200 m Freestyle Relay, Hurley finished a close 7th. Hurley also finished 6th in the 1500m Freestyle.

At the 2012 Australian Short Course Championships in Perth, Hurley returned to his sprint Backstroke events after a two-year layoff, winning the 50m and 100m Backstroke events, and placing second in the 200m Freestyle, securing his spot on the National Team to compete at the 2012 FINA World Championships (25m) in Istanbul later that year.

At the 2012 FINA World Cup, Hurley competed on the whole tour for the first time in his career. He won 23 medals (5 Gold) and broke the Australian Record in the 100m Backstroke (50.18) for the third time in his career. Hurley finished 6th on the overall point score with 57 points.

==== FINA World Championships (25m), Istanbul ====
At the 2012 FINA World Championships (25m) in Istanbul, Turkey, Hurley had another breakout performance winning Gold in the 50m Backstroke. He broke his own Australian Record in the semi-final (23.14), then re-breaking it to win the final in 23.04 and defeat Olympic Champion Matt Grevers from the United States, and defending champion Stanislav Donets of Russia. This record stood for 3 years before recently being broken by Mitch Larkin. Hurley also won Silver in the 4 × 200 m Freestyle Relay in Australian Record time, and Bronze in the 4 × 100 m Medley Relay, as well as finishing 5th in the 100m Backstroke.

2012 World Championships (25m)		
Event	Time	Place
50m Backstroke	23.04 AR	Gold
4 × 200 m Freestyle Relay	6:52.29 AR	Silver
4 × 100 m Medley Relay	3:24.77	Bronze
100m Backstroke	50.63	5th

=== 2013-2016 ===
At the 2013 Australian Short Course Championships in Sydney, Hurley won 3 gold medals in the 50m, 100m Backstroke and 200m Freestyle, and bronze in the 100m Freestyle. These 3 gold medals took Hurley's tally to 21 National Titles.

At the 2013 FINA World Cup, Hurley had his best tour to date, winning 34 medals (15 Gold) across 8 competitions, and placed 3rd on the overall point score with 285 points. Along with Christian Sprenger, Cate Campbell and Alicia Coutts, Hurley broke the World Record in the 4x50m Mixed Medley Relay three times, swimming the Backstroke leg each time. He also broke his own Australian Record twice in the 100m Backstroke, swimming 50.01 seconds at the Berlin stop, before being the first Australian to break to 50 second barrier, swimming 49.92 at the Tokyo stop of the World Cup. Hurley has now broken the Australian Record in the event five times. This was also a Commonwealth Record.

At the 2014 Australian Championships in Brisbane, Hurley picked up a silver medal in the 50m Backstroke, and also placed 5th in the 100m Backstroke and 8th in the 200m Backstroke. Hurley had to overcome chronic elbow pain and numerous cortisone injections just to be able to compete.

In May 2014, Hurley underwent revolutionary stem cell therapy in both elbows in a bid to overcome osteoarthritis, followed by a 4-month break from the sport. Hurley then announced a move to Club Wolverine out of the University of Michigan, to continue his training towards the 2016 Olympics.

==== 2016 Olympic Trials ====
At the 2016 Australian Olympic Trials in Adelaide, Hurley placed 6th in the 100m Backstroke final and 2nd in the non-olympic 50m Backstroke final. Hurley was not selected on the Australian Olympic Team.

At the 2016 FINA World Cup, Hurley collected 6 Gold, 15 Silver and 10 Bronze medals across the first 6 meets, before contracting brachial neuritis in the right shoulder and having to withdraw from the rest of the tour.

At the 2016 Australian Short Course Championships in Adelaide, Hurley swam with the brachial neuritis nerve injury and famously took 3rd in the 50m Backstroke without arms, using just kick. He regathered to race the 100m Backstroke and defeat reigning world champion Mitchell Larkin to take Gold.

==== FINA World Championships (25m), Windsor ====
At the 2016 FINA World Championships (25m) in Windsor, Canada, Hurley placed 5th in the 50m Backstroke and 4x50m Medley Relay, 11th in the 100m Backstroke, and collected a Silver medal as a heat swimmer of the 4 × 100 m Medley Relay.

2016 World Championships (25m)		
50m Backstroke	23.20	5th
100m Backstroke	50.87	11th
4x50m Medley Relay	1:33.29	5th
4 × 100 m Medley Relay (heat swimmer)	3:23.56	Silver

=== 2017: Coaching ===
Hurley moved to Cape Town, South Africa, to start professional coaching as Performance Manager of the Chad le Clos Swimming Academy. Hurley was exclusively coaching Cameron van der Burgh and Danie Marais, and co-coaching Chad le Clos with mentor Andrea Di Nino and the Energy Standard International Swimming Club. Le Clos picked up Gold at the 2017 FINA World Swimming Championships in the 200m Butterfly, and van der Burgh Bronze in the 50m Breaststroke in a personal best time, and both swimmers swam personal best times at the following FINA World Cup. Marais finished with a personal best 22nd in the 5 km open water event.

== Career-best times ==
=== Long Course ===
Event	Time	Meet	Location	Australian All-time Ranking
50m Backstroke	25.07	2016 Australian Olympic Trials	(Australia) Adelaide	7th
100m Backstroke	54.02	2013 Australian Championships	(Australia) Adelaide	7th
200m Backstroke	1:59.33	2015 Australian Championships	(Australia) Sydney	
200m freestyle	1:48.17	2009 Australian Championships	(Australia) Sydney	
400m Freestyle	3:46.01	2009 FINA World Championships	(Italy) Rome	8th
800m Freestyle	7:50.65	2009 FINA World Championships	(Italy) Rome	8th
1500m Freestyle	15:00.96	2010 Australian Championships	(Australia) Sydney	8th

=== Short Course ===
Event	Time	Meet	Location	Australian All-time Ranking
50m Backstroke	23:04	2012 FINA World Championships	(Turkey) Istanbul	2nd
100m Backstroke	49.92	2013 FINA World Cup	(Japan) Tokyo	2nd
200m Backstroke	1:51.70	2016 FINA World Cup	(Qatar) Doha	5th
200m Freestyle	1:43.12	2013 FINA World Cup	(Japan) Tokyo	8th
400m Freestyle	3:38.35	2009 FINA World Cup	(Germany) Berlin	5th
800m Freestyle	7:46.52	2009 FINA World Cup	Singapore	7th
1500m Freestyle	14:32.47	2009 FINA World Cup	Singapore	4th

== See also ==
- World record progression 50 metres backstroke

Records
Preceded by Thomas Rupprath	Men's 50 metre backstroke world record holder (short course); 26 October 2008 – 12 November 2008	Succeeded by Peter Marshall
