= Adrien Perez (swimmer) =

Swiss swimmer (born 1988)

Personal information
- Nationality: Switzerland
- Born: 12 January 1988 (age 38)
- Height: 1.87 m (6 ft 2 in)
- Weight: 87 kg (192 lb)

Sport
- Sport: Swimming
- Event: Freestyle
- Club: Red-Fish Neuchâtel (SUI)

Adrien Perez (born 12 January 1988) is a Swiss swimmer, who specialized in freestyle events. He represented Switzerland at the 2008 Summer Olympics in Beijing, and competed as part of the men's national swimming team for the men's 4 × 100 m freestyle relay. Perez joined the team, along with compatriots Flori Lang, Dominik Meichtry, and Karel Novy, and swam in the final leg of the competition, with an individual split time of 49.90 seconds. He and his swimming team placed seventh in the second heat, and thirteenth overall, for a total time of 3:16.80.
