= 2010 Oceania Swimming Championships =

The 8th Oceania Swimming Championships were held 21–26 June 2010, at the Tuanaimato Aquatic Centre in Apia, Samoa. It was the eighth edition of the biennial championships, and featured competition in swimming, open water swimming and synchronized swimming. The open water events were swum in the waters off Faleasiu.

== Participating countries ==
Countries with confirmed teams for the 2010 Oceania Swimming Championships were:

- American Samoa
- Australia (23)
- Cook Islands
- Fiji (11)
- Guam
- Hawaii
- Marshall Islands
- New Caledonia
- New Zealand (20)
- Palau
- Papua New Guinea (9)
- Samoa (7)
- Tonga

== Event schedule ==
| Date | Monday; 21 June | Tuesday; 22 June | Wednesday; 23 June | Thursday; 24 June | Friday; 25 June | Saturday; 26 June |
| S w i m m i n g | | 50 fly 200 free 100 back 200 fly 1500 free (men) | 50 back 100 free 100 breast 400 IM; 4×200 free relay | | 50 breast 400 free 100 fly 200 back 4×100 free relay | 800 free (women); 200 IM; 50 free 200 breast 4×100 medley relay |
| Open; Water | 5K | | | 10K | | |
| Synchro | | Noon-5 pm | Noon-5 pm | | Noon-5 pm | Noon-5 pm |

== Results ==
=== Men ===
| Event | Gold | | Silver | | Bronze | |
|---|---|---|---|---|---|---|
| 50 m freestyle | James Roberts; Australia | 22.95 | Hamish Rose; Australia | 23.09 | Ryan Pini; Papua New Guinea | 23.49 |
| 100 m freestyle | Luke Kerswell; Australia | 50.64 | James Roberts; Australia | 50.75 | Andrew McMillan; New Zealand | 51.16 |
| 200 m freestyle | Andrew McMillan; New Zealand | 1:50.74 | Matthew Terry; Australia | 1:51.79 | Jarrod Killey; Australia | 1:52.88 |
| 400 m freestyle | Matthew Terry; Australia | 3:53.59 | Jarrod Killey; Australia | 3:59.67 | Dylan Dunlop-Barrett; New Zealand | 3:59.99 |
| 1500 m freestyle | Dylan Dunlop-Barrett; New Zealand | 15:43.02 | Terry Matthew; Australia | 15:45.04 | Ryan Phillip; Australia | 16:22.84 |
| 50 m backstroke | Braiden Camm; Australia | 26.47 | Bobby Jovanovich; Australia | 27.11 | Daren Choi; Hawaii | 27.31 |
| 100 m backstroke | Braiden Camm; Australia | 56.37 | Bobby Jovanovich; Australia | 58.09 | Daren Choi; Hawaii | 58.15 |
| 200 m backstroke | Braiden Camm; Australia | 2:01.88 | Mitch Larkin; Australia | 2:03.03 | Daren Choi; Hawaii | 2:11.58 |
| 50 m breaststroke | Amini Fonua; Tonga | 28.57 | Nick Ferrif; New Zealand | 28.64 | Luke Westgaard; New Zealand | 29.69 |
| 100 m breaststroke | Nick Ferrif; New Zealand | 1:02.79 | Jeremy Meyer; Australia | 1:03.37 | Amini Fonua; Tonga | 1:03.49 |
| 200 m breaststroke | Jeremy Meyer; Australia | 2:15.27; CR | Thomas Dahlia; New Caledonia | 2:17.16 | Luke Westgaard; New Zealand | 2:21.01 |
| 50 m butterfly | Ryan Pini; Papua New Guinea | 24.64 | James Roberts; Australia | 24.98 | Amini Fonua; Tonga | 25.02 |
| 100 m butterfly | Ryan Pini; Papua New Guinea | 53.98 | Grant Irvine; Australia | 54.19 | Andrew McMillan; New Zealand | 54.47 |
| 200 m butterfly | Andrew McMillan; New Zealand | 2:00.02 | Shaun Burnett; New Zealand | 2:01.14 | Grant Irvine; Australia | 2:01.76 |
| 200 m individual medley | Mitch Larkin; Australia | 2:04.14 | Steven Kent; New Zealand | 2:05.95 | Jarrod Killey; Australia | 2:07.72 |
| 400 m individual medley | Mitch Larkin; Australia | 4:22.17; CR | Steven Kent; New Zealand | 4:37.22 | Kacy Johnson; Hawaii | 4:37.88 |
| 4 × 100 m freestyle relay | Australia; Hamish Rose, James Roberts, Jarrod Killey, Luke Kerswell | 3:23.79 | New Zealand; Andrew McMillan, Steven Kent, Matthew Stanley, Shaun Burnett | 3:30.32 | New Caledonia; Thomas Dahlia, Rudy Bernard, Bryan Spitz, Thomas Chacun | 3:33.22 |
| 4 × 200 m freestyle relay | Australia | 7:28.61 | New Zealand | 7:32.97 | New Caledonia | 7:53.07 |
| 4 × 100 m medley relay | Australia; Braiden Camm, Jeremy Meyer, Grant Irvine, Luke Kerswell | 3:43.97 | New Zealand; Dylan Dunlop-Barrett, Nick Ferrif, Shaun Burnett, Andrew McMillan | 3:49.55 | New Caledonia; Bryan Spitz, Thomas Dahlia, Thomas Chacun, Rudy Bernard | 3:55.23 |
| 5k open water | Jarrod Killey; Australia | 58.13 | Codie Grimsey; Australia | 58.15 | Philip Ryan; New Zealand | 58.18 |
| 10k open water | Codie Grimsey; Australia | 2:05:19.71 | Philip Ryan; New Zealand | 2:07:05.74 | Kacy Johnson; Hawaii | 2:14:34.25 |

Legend: CR – Championship record

=== Women ===
| Event | Gold | | Silver | | Bronze | |
|---|---|---|---|---|---|---|
| 50 m freestyle | Amy Allen; Australia | 26.25 | Hannah Saunders; New Zealand | 26.36 | Amelia Evatt-Davey; Australia | 26.53 |
| 100 m freestyle | Amelia Evatt‑Davey; Australia | 56.16 | Jade Neilsen; Australia | 57.03 | Hannah Saunders; New Zealand | 57.29 |
| 200 m freestyle | Amelia Evatt-Davey; Australia | 2:01.21 | Amy Allen; Australia | 2:02.65 | Samantha Lucie-Smith; New Zealand | 2:03.26 |
| 400 m freestyle | Jade Neilsen; Australia | 4:17.44 | Tiffany Papaemanouil; Australia | 4:17.61 | Samantha Lucie-Smith; New Zealand | 4:20.60 |
| 800 m freestyle | Amy Allen; Australia | 8:46.53 | Belinda Bennett; Australia | 8:48.75 | Samantha Lucie-Smith; New Zealand | 8:57.62 |
| 50 m backstroke | Whitney Ireland; Australia | 29.70 | Laura Quilter; New Zealand | 29.84 | Jenni O'Neil; Australia | 29.99 |
| 100 m backstroke | Jenni O'Neil; Australia | 1:02.47 | Jessie Blundell; New Zealand | 1:02.67 | Sophia Batchelor; New Zealand | 1:02.79 |
| 200 m backstroke | Sophia Batchelor; New Zealand | 2:11.94 | Jenni O'Neil; Australia | 2:12.15 | Jessie Blundell; New Zealand | 2:15.64 |
| 50 m breaststroke | Rebecca Kemp; Australia | 32.30 | Tiffany Papaemanouil; Australia | 33.82 | Simsara Rouan; New Caledonia | 36.26 |
| 100 m breaststroke | Rebecca Kemp; Australia | 1:08.86; CR | Grace Francis; New Zealand | 1:12.07 | Pilar Shimizu; Guam | 1:18.82 |
| 200 m breaststroke | Rebecca Kemp; Australia | 2:26.63; CR | Grace Francis; New Zealand | 2:34.40 | Marona Bong; New Caledonia | 2:52.99 |
| 50 m butterfly | Samantha Lee; New Zealand | 27.69 | Madeline Groves; Australia | 27.86 | Amy Smith; Australia | 28.09 |
| 100 m butterfly | Madeline Groves; Australia | 1:00.11 | Amy Smith; Australia | 1:00.88 | Samantha Lee; New Zealand | 1:01.32 |
| 200 m butterfly | Madeline Groves; Australia | 2:12.49 | Amy Smith; Australia | 2:12.98 | Charlotte Webby; New Zealand | 2:15.47 |
| 200 m individual medley | Grace Francis; New Zealand | 2:15.89 | Jenni O'Neil; Australia | 2:17.27 | Tiffany Papaemanouil; Australia | 2:20.36 |
| 400 m individual medley | Tiffany Papaemanouil; Australia | 4:56.19 | Samantha Lucie-Smith; New Zealand | 5:02.24 | Summer Harrison; Hawaii | 5:12.73 |
| 4 × 100 m freestyle relay | Australia; Amelia Evatt-Davey, Amy Allen, Jade Neilsen, Jenni O'Neil | 3:47.48 | New Zealand; Hannah Saunders, Lisa Pankhurst, Samantha Lucie-Smith, Sophia Batchelor | 3:51.10 | Hawaii; Summer Harrison, Jasmine Mau, Samantha Moody, Rachel Fujitta | 4:07.46 |
| 4 × 200 m freestyle relay | Australia | 8:18.58 | New Zealand | 8:36.06 | Hawaii | 8:53.29 |
| 4 × 100 m medley relay | Australia; Jenni O'Neil, Rebecca Kemp, Madeline Groves, Amelia Evatt-Davey | 4:08.92; CR | New Zealand; Renee Stothard, Grace Francis, Charlotte Webby, Hannah Saunders | 4:18.54 | Hawaii; Anu Nihipali, Summer Harrison, Samantha Moody, Jasmine Mau | 4:40.72 |
| 5k open water | Belinda Bennett; Australia | 1:00.22 | Brooke Wilson; Australia | 1:03.15 | Jasmine Mau; Hawaii | 1:08.20 |
| 10k open water | Belinda Bennett; Australia | 2:17:18.24 | Brooke Wilson; Australia | 2:17:19.27 | Laurene Gosse; New Caledonia | 2:35:30.89 |

Legend: CR – Championship record

== Overall medal table ==
Medal standings for the Swimming and Open Water competitions are:

* Host nation (Samoa)

| Rank | Nation | Gold | Silver | Bronze | Total |
|---|---|---|---|---|---|
| 1 | Australia (AUS) | 32 | 24 | 8 | 64 |
| 2 | New Zealand (NZL) | 7 | 17 | 13 | 37 |
| 3 | Papua New Guinea (PNG) | 2 | 0 | 1 | 3 |
| 4 | Tonga (TGA) | 1 | 0 | 2 | 3 |
| 5 | New Caledonia (NCL) | 0 | 1 | 7 | 8 |
| 6 | Hawaii (HAW) | 0 | 0 | 10 | 10 |
| 7 | Guam (GUM) | 0 | 0 | 1 | 1 |
| 8 | Cook Islands (COK) | 0 | 0 | 0 | 0 |
| 8 | Fiji (FIJ) | 0 | 0 | 0 | 0 |
| 8 | Marshall Islands (MHL) | 0 | 0 | 0 | 0 |
| 8 | Palau (PLW) | 0 | 0 | 0 | 0 |
| 8 | Samoa (SAM)* | 0 | 0 | 0 | 0 |
| Totals (12 entries) | | 42 | 42 | 42 | 126 |
