= Swimming at the 2008 Summer Olympics – Men's 4 × 100 metre freestyle relay =

Men's 4 × 100 metre freestyle relay at the Games of the XXIX Olympiad
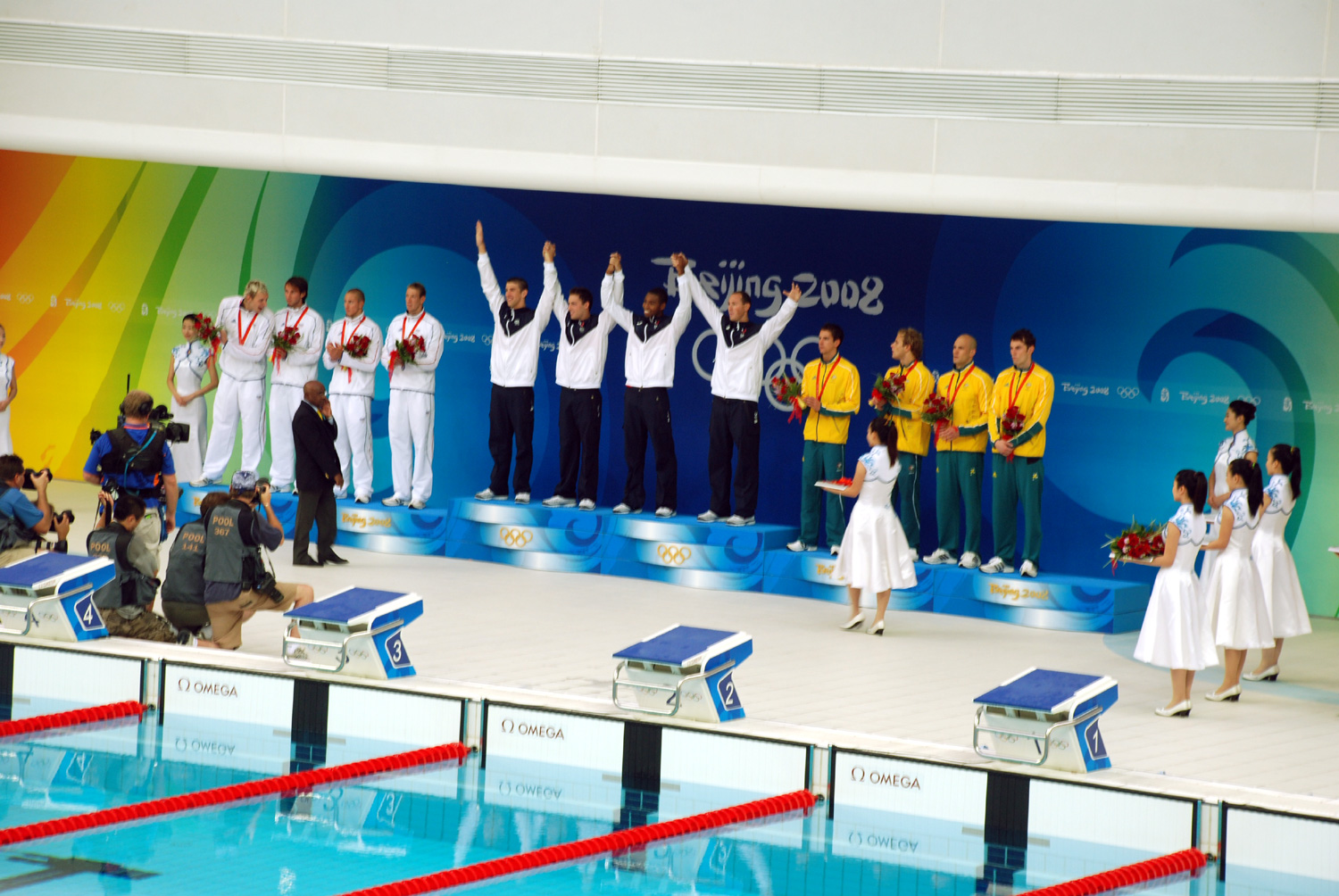
- The medal ceremony of the event.
- Venue: Beijing National Aquatics Center
- Dates: August 10, 2008 (heats); August 11, 2008 (final)
- Competitors: 72 from 16 nations
- Teams: 16
- Winning time: 3:08.24 WR

Medalists
1st place, gold medalist(s)		Michael Phelps, Garrett Weber-Gale, Cullen Jones, Jason Lezak, Nathan Adrian*, Matt Grevers*, Ben Wildman-Tobriner*	United States
2nd place, silver medalist(s)		Amaury Leveaux, Fabien Gilot, Frédérick Bousquet, Alain Bernard, Grégory Mallet*, Boris Steimetz*	France
3rd place, bronze medalist(s)		Eamon Sullivan, Andrew Lauterstein, Ashley Callus, Matt Targett, Leith Brodie*, Patrick Murphy*; *Indicates the swimmer only competed in the preliminary heats.	Australia

The men's 4 × 100 metre freestyle relay event at the 2008 Olympic Games took place on 10–11 August at the Beijing National Aquatics Center in Beijing, China.

Before the race, the French team was reportedly confident of its ultimate victory, with world record holder Alain Bernard saying: "The Americans? We're going to smash them. That’s what we came here for."

Trailing the French team by nearly 6/10th of a second entering the final leg, the U.S. team came from behind to set a new world record and most importantly, to capture the elusive freestyle relay title after 12 years. Diving into the pool at the final exchange, Jason Lezak chased down world record-holder Frenchman Alain Bernard on the 50-metre final length and touched the wall first with a scintillating anchor time of 46.06, the fastest split in the event's history until 2024, to deliver the foursome of Michael Phelps (47.51, an American record), Garrett Weber-Gale (47.02), and Cullen Jones (47.65) the gold-medal in a world-record time of 3:08.24. Lezak's comeback is often considered to be the greatest the sport has ever seen.

After the 1st three legs, France's Amaury Leveaux (47.91), Fabien Gilot (47.05), and Frédérick Bousquet (46.63) had delivered Bernard a lead of more than a half-second (.59). However, despite producing the 3rd-fastest split of the event, Bernard's time of 46.73 was still 0.67 seconds slower than Lezak's split, leaving the French team with the silver medal in a European record of 3:08.32. Meanwhile, Eamon Sullivan smashed the world record split of 47.24 to hand the Aussies an early lead, but his teammates Andrew Lauterstein (47.87), Ashley Callus (47.55), and Matt Targett (47.25) could not maintain the pace in the succeeding laps to end the race with a bronze-medal time of 3:09.91.

Italy's Alessandro Calvi (48.49), Christian Galenda (47.49), Marco Belotti (48.23), and Filippo Magnini (47.27) finished fourth in 3:11.65, while the Swedish foursome of Petter Stymne (49.17), five-time Olympian Lars Frölander (48.02), Stefan Nystrand (47.25), and Jonas Persson (47.48) cracked a 3:12-barrier to earn a fifth spot in 3:11.92. Outside the club, Canada's Brent Hayden (47.56, a national record), Joel Greenshields (47.77), Colin Russell (48.49), and three-time Olympian Rick Say (48.44) posted a sixth-place time of 3:12.26, while defending Olympic champions and South African quartet of Lyndon Ferns (48.15), Darian Townsend (48.11), Roland Schoeman (48.32), and Ryk Neethling (48.08) produced a seventh-place effort and an African record of 3:12.66 to lower their standard by more than half a second. Great Britain's Simon Burnett (48.34), Adam Brown (47.75), Benjamin Hockin (48.50), and Ross Davenport (48.28) rounded out the field in eighth place at 3:12.87. Due to the presence of technology suits in the pool, all eight teams completed a historic relay finish under a 3:13-barrier.

Earlier in the prelims, the U.S. men's team of Nathan Adrian (48.82), Cullen Jones (47.61), Ben Wildman-Tobriner (48.03), and Matt Grevers (47.77) took down the world record of 3:12.23 to cut off their own standard by 23-hundredths of a second.

== Records ==
Prior to this competition, the existing world and Olympic records were as follows.

World record	United States (USA); Michael Phelps (48.83); Neil Walker (47.89); Cullen Jones (47.96); Jason Lezak (47.78)	3:12.46	Victoria, Canada	19 August 2006	
Olympic record	South Africa; Roland Schoeman (48.17); Lyndon Ferns (48.13); Darian Townsend (48.96); Ryk Neethling (47.91)	3:13.17	Athens, Greece	15 August 2004	-

The following new world and Olympic records were set during this competition.

Date	Event	Name	Nationality	Time	Record
August 10	Heat 1	Nathan Adrian (48.82); Cullen Jones (47.61); Ben Wildman-Tobriner (48.03); Matt Grevers (47.77)	United States	3:12.23	WR
August 11	Final	Michael Phelps (47.51) AM; Garrett Weber-Gale (47.02); Cullen Jones (47.65); Jason Lezak (46.06)	United States	3:08.24	WR

== Results ==
=== Heats ===
Rank	Heat	Lane	Nationality	Names	Time	Notes
1	1	4	United States	Nathan Adrian (48.82); Cullen Jones (47.61); Ben Wildman-Tobriner (48.03); Matt Grevers (47.77)	3:12.23	Q, WR
2	2	4	France	Amaury Leveaux (47.76) OR; Grégory Mallet (48.14); Boris Steimetz (49.83); Frédérick Bousquet (46.63)	3:12.36	Q, ER
3	1	5	Australia	Andrew Lauterstein (48.68); Leith Brodie (48.42); Patrick Murphy (48.09); Matt Targett (47.22)	3:12.41	Q, OC
4	2	5	Italy	Alessandro Calvi (48.58); Christian Galenda (47.67); Michele Santucci (49.56); Filippo Magnini (46.84)	3:12.65	Q, NR
5	1	3	Sweden	Stefan Nystrand (48.31); Petter Stymne (48.41); Lars Frölander (48.35); Jonas Persson (47.66)	3:12.73	Q, NR
6	2	3	South Africa	Lyndon Ferns (48.20); Roland Schoeman (48.85); Ryk Neethling (48.51); Darian Townsend (47.50)	3:13.06	Q, AF
7	1	2	Canada	Brent Hayden (48.28); Joel Greenshields (48.06); Rick Say (49.11); Colin Russell (48.23)	3:13.68	Q, NR
8	2	1	Great Britain	Simon Burnett (48.20) NR; Adam Brown (48.43); Ben Hockin (48.55); Ross Davenport (48.51)	3:13.69	Q, NR
9	2	6	Russia	Yevgeny Lagunov (48.45); Andrey Grechin (48.08); Andrey Kapralov (49.07); Sergey Fesikov (48.47)	3:14.07	
10	1	6	Netherlands	Mitja Zastrow (49.40); Pieter van den Hoogenband (47.17); Bas van Velthoven (49.08); Robert Lijesen (49.25)	3:14.90	
11	1	7	New Zealand	Mark Herring (49.73); Cameron Gibson (48.07); Willy Benson (48.65); Orinoco Faamausili-Banse (48.96)	3:15.41	NR
12	2	7	China	Chen Zuo (49.16); Huang Shaohua (48.83); Lü Zhiwu (48.72); Cai Li (49.45)	3:16.16	AS
13	2	8	Switzerland	Dominik Meichtry (48.96); Karel Novy (48.60); Flori Lang (49.34); Adrien Perez (49.90)	3:16.80	
14	1	8	Japan	Takuro Fujii (49.15); Hisayoshi Sato (48.92); Masayuki Kishida (50.00); Yoshihiro Okumura (49.21)	3:17.28	NR
15	1	1	Germany	Steffen Deibler (49.61); Jens Schreiber (49.58); Benjamin Starke (49.65); Paul Biedermann (49.15)	3:17.99	
	2	2	Brazil	César Cielo (47.91) NR; Rodrigo Castro (49.23); Fernando Silva (49.53); Nicolas Oliveira	DSQ	

=== Final ===
Rank	Lane	Nationality	Names	Time	Time behind	Notes
1st place, gold medalist(s)	4	United States	Michael Phelps (47.51) AM; Garrett Weber-Gale (47.02); Cullen Jones (47.65); Jason Lezak (46.06)	3:08.24		WR
2nd place, silver medalist(s)	5	France	Amaury Leveaux (47.91); Fabien Gilot (47.05); Frédérick Bousquet (46.63); Alain Bernard (46.73)	3:08.32	0.08	ER
3rd place, bronze medalist(s)	3	Australia	Eamon Sullivan (47.24) WR; Andrew Lauterstein (47.87); Ashley Callus (47.55); Matt Targett (47.25)	3:09.91	1.67	OC
4	6	Italy	Alessandro Calvi (48.49); Christian Galenda (47.49); Marco Belotti (48.23); Filippo Magnini (47.27)	3:11.48	3.24	NR
5	2	Sweden	Petter Stymne (49.17); Lars Frölander (48.02); Stefan Nystrand (47.25); Jonas Persson (47.48)	3:11.92	3.68	NR
6	1	Canada	Brent Hayden (47.56) NR; Joel Greenshields (47.77); Colin Russell (48.49); Rick Say (48.44)	3:12.26	4.02	NR
7	7	South Africa	Lyndon Ferns (48.15); Darian Townsend (48.11); Roland Schoeman (48.32); Ryk Neethling (48.08)	3:12.66	4.42	AF
8	8	Great Britain	Simon Burnett (48.34); Adam Brown (47.75); Ben Hockin (48.50); Ross Davenport (48.28)	3:12.87	4.63	NR

== New records and feats ==
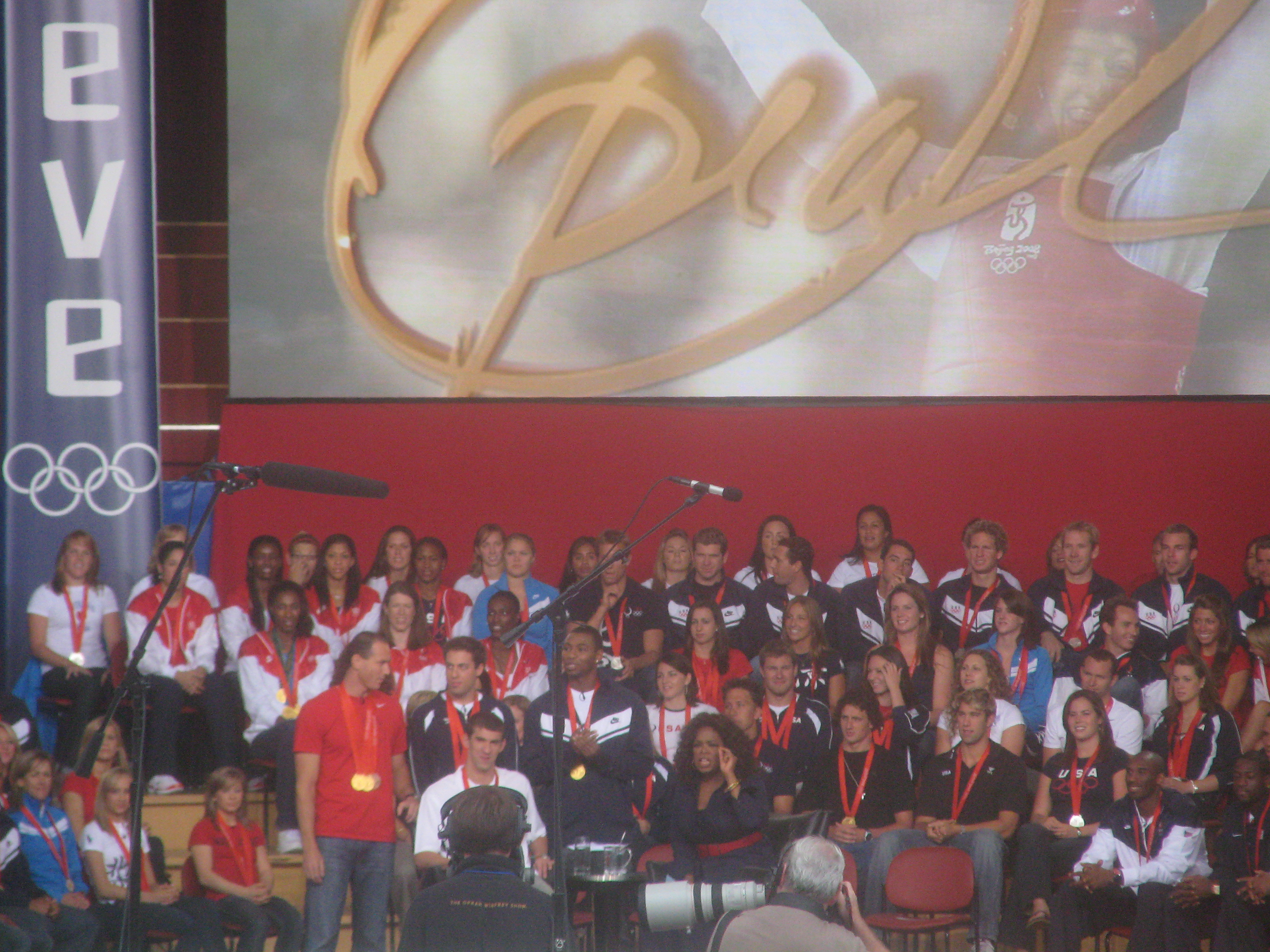
Standing (l to r):Jason Lezak, Garrett Weber-Gale, Cullen Jones behind Michael Phelps at September 3, 2008 taping of season-opening September 8, 2008 Oprah Winfrey Show.

In the heats, the United States team set a world record with a team missing some of America's major stars such as Michael Phelps. France and Australia also went faster than the old record even though they rested Alain Bernard and Eamon Sullivan respectively. During the heats, all five of the continental records were broken.

In the final, the United States, France, Australia, Italy, and Sweden teams all finished within the world-record time set by the American team in the heats, the Canada team finished within what was the World record prior to the 2008 Olympics, and all of the teams finished within what was the Olympic record prior to the 2008 Olympics. The world record time was reduced by over 2% during the course of the heats and the final. Italy and Sweden failed to medal despite besting the previous world record.

The faster times can also be seen in contrast to the 2004 Olympics in Athens, in which the South African squad took home the gold medal in world-record fashion. South Africa returned all four members of that 2004 relay team to these Olympics, and they even bettered their previous world-record time by 0.51 s, yet they finished a distant 7th place in Beijing.

Date	Round	NOC	Names	Record	Type
August 11, 2008	Final	United States	Michael Phelps 47.51 AM; Garrett Weber-Gale 47.02; Cullen Jones 47.65; Jason Lezak 46.06	3:08.24	World Record
August 11, 2008	Final	France	Amaury Leveaux 47.91; Fabien Gilot 47.05; Frédérick Bousquet 46.63; Alain Bernard 46.73	3:08.32	European Record
August 11, 2008	Final	Australia	Eamon Sullivan 47.24 WR; Andrew Lauterstein 47.87; Ashley Callus 47.55; Matt Targett 47.25	3:09.91	Oceanian Record; Commonwealth Record
August 11, 2008	Final	Italy	Alessandro Calvi 48.49; Christian Galenda 47.49; Marco Belotti 48.23; Filippo Magnini 47.27	3:11.48	Italian Record
August 11, 2008	Final	Sweden	Petter Stymne 49.17; Lars Frölander 48.02; Stefan Nystrand 47.25; Jonas Persson 47.48	3:11.92	Swedish Record
August 11, 2008	Final	Canada	Brent Hayden 47.56 NR; Joel Greenshields 47.77; Colin Russell 48.49; Rick Say 48.44	3:12.26	Canadian Record
August 11, 2008	Final	South Africa	Lyndon Ferns 48.15; Darian Townsend 48.11; Roland Schoeman 48.32; Ryk Neethling 48.08	3:12.66	African Record
August 11, 2008	Final	Great Britain	Simon Burnett 48.34; Adam Brown 47.75; Benjamin Hockin 48.50; Ross Davenport 48.28	3:12.87	British Record
August 10, 2008	Heat 1	United States	Nathan Adrian 48.82; Cullen Jones 47.61; Ben Wildman-Tobriner 48.03; Matt Grevers 47.77	3:12.23	World Record
August 10, 2008	Heat 1	Australia	Andrew Lauterstein 48.68; Leith Brodie 48.42; Patrick Murphy 48.09; Matt Targett 47.22	3:12.41	Oceanian Record
August 10, 2008	Heat 2	France	Amaury Leveaux 47.76 OR; Grégory Mallet 48.14; Boris Steimetz 49.83; Frédérick Bousquet 46.6	3:12.36	European Record
August 10, 2008	Heat 2	South Africa	Lyndon Ferns 48.20; Roland Schoeman 48.85; Ryk Neethling 48.51; Darian Townsend 47.50	3:13.06	African Record
August 10, 2008	Heat 2	China	Zuo Chen 49.16; Shaohua Huang 48.83; Lü Zhiwu 48.72; Li Cai 49.45	3:16.16	Asian Record
August 10, 2008	Heat 2	Great Britain	Simon Burnett 48.20 NR; Adam Brown 48.43; Benjamin Hockin 48.55; Ross Davenport 48.51	3:13.69	British Record

It is also possible for the swimmers in the first leg to break records for the 100 m freestyle. In the heats, Amaury Leveaux of France broke the Olympic record, while the world record fell to Australian Eamon Sullivan in the final. Split times for swimmers not swimming the first leg are ineligible because the incoming swimmer can lean over in front of the blocks and be diving as the preceding swimmer is coming in, whereas the leadoff swimmer is timed from a stationary start. Thus, the world record was Sullivan's, even though five swimmers in the finals alone had faster times, including Jason Lezak, whose 46.06 seconds is the fastest individual leg in a 100 m freestyle or medley relay in history. Two days later, Alain Bernard reclaimed the record for France, recording a 47.20 time in the first semifinal of the 100m freestyle, only to have Sullivan break the record again, winning the second semifinal in 47.05 seconds.

The final included a dramatic finish with American Jason Lezak swimming the final 50 meters 0.9 seconds faster than Frenchman Alain Bernard to win the race. He also swam the fastest relay split in history. Dan Hicks and Rowdy Gaines had the call on NBC:

The United States trying to hang on to second; they should get the silver medal; Australia is in Bronze territory right now, but Lezak is closing a little bit on Bernard. Can the veteran chase him down and pull off a shocker here? Well, there's no doubt that he's tightening up! Bernard is losing some ground, here comes Lezak... UNBELIEVABLE AT THE END, HE'S DONE IT! THE U.S. HAS DONE IT! HE DID IT! HE DID IT TOGETHER! A new world record! Phelps's hopes [are] alive!

-Dan Hicks and Rowdy Gaines calling the final lap of the 4x100m relay.

That might be the most incredible relay split I've ever seen in my entire life. 46 flat, not only was that the fastest in history, it BLEW AWAY the fastest in history!

-Rowdy Gaines on Jason Lezak's record split of 46.06 seconds.

Date	Round	Name	NOC	Record	Type
August 11, 2008	Final	Eamon Sullivan	Australia	47.24	World Record (100 m freestyle)
August 11, 2008	Final	Michael Phelps	United States	47.51	Americas Record (100 m freestyle)
August 11, 2008	Final	Brent Hayden	Canada	47.56	National Record (100 m freestyle)
August 10, 2008	Heat 2	Amaury Leveaux	France	47.76	Olympic Record (100 m freestyle)
August 10, 2008	Heat 2	César Cielo	Brazil	47.91	National Record (100 m freestyle)
August 10, 2008	Heat 2	Simon Burnett	Great Britain	48.20	National Record (100 m freestyle)
