= 2002 Oceania Swimming Championships =

International sporting competition

The 2002 Oceania Swimming Championships were held 11–14 June in Nouméa, New Caledonia.

All swimming competition listed below were swum in a 50m (long-course) pool.

== Participating countries ==
The 2002 Oceania Swimming Championships featured 117 swimmers from:

- Australia
- Fiji
- Guam
- Hawaii
- New Caledonia
- New Zealand
- Northern Mariana Islands
- Papua New Guinea
- Samoa
- Tahiti

== Event schedule ==
Date	Day 1	Day 2	Day 3	Day 4
E v e n t s	200 free (M); 50 breast (W); 200 fly (W); 50 back (M); 400 IM (W); 400 IM (M); 400 free relay (M); 800 free relay (W)	100 fly (M); 100 free (W); 100 breast (M); 100 back (W); 50 free (M); 200 breast (W); 400 free (M); 50 fly (W); 200 back (M); 800 free relay (M); 800 free (W)	50 back (W); 50 breast (M); 200 fly (M); 400 free (W); 400 free relay (W)	100 back (M); 100 breast (W); 100 fly (W); 100 free (M); 50 free (W); 200 breast (M); 200 back (W); 200 IM (M); 200 IM (M); 50 fly (M); 200 free (W); 400 medley relay (M); 400 medley relay (W); 1500 free (M)

- Semifinals were held in the 50s and 100s. In the 50s the semifinals were held the same evening as the final; in the 100s the semifinals were held the night before the finals.

== Results ==
=== Swimming ===
==== Men ====
Event	Gold		Silver		Bronze	
50m Freestyle	Andrew Dyson; Australia	23.20	Raymond McDonald; Australia	23.39	Gilles Dumesnil; New Caledonia	23.59
100m Freestyle	Andrew Dyson; Australia	51.15 CR	Raymond McDonald; Australia	51.19	Ben Denner; Australia	51.49
200m Freestyle	Nicholas Sprenger; Australia	1:52.18 CR	Ben Denner; Australia	1:52.23	Andrew Dyson; Australia	1:54.80
400m Freestyle	Josh Krogh; Australia	3:56.95 CR	Nicholas Sprenger; Australia	3:58.88	Travis Nederpelt; Australia	3:59.36
1500m Freestyle	Travis Nederpelt; Australia	15:42.07	Daniel Lysaught; Australia	15:53.55	Matthew Dodds; New Zealand	16:21.74
50m Backstroke	Daniel Blackborrow; Australia	26.84 CR	Ashley Anderson; Australia	26.93	Ryan Pini; Papua New Guinea	27.18
100m Backstroke	Ashley Anderson; Australia	57.04 CR	Matthew Spicer; Australia	57.10	Daniel Spicer; Australia	58.70
200m Backstroke	Adam Lucas; Australia	2:03.47 CR	Matthew Spicer; Australia	2:05.55	Ashley Anderson; Australia	2:06.13
50m Breaststroke	Robert McDonald; Australia	29.39 CR	Luke Trickett; Australia	29.66	Kieran Daly; New Zealand	30.44
100m Breaststroke	Robert McDonald; Australia	1:03.28 CR	Luke Trickett; Australia	1:03.58	Kieran Daly; New Zealand	1:06.30
200m Breaststroke	Luke Trickett; Australia	2:16.38 CR	Robert McDonald; Australia	2:18.75	Kieran Daly; New Zealand	2:27.02
50m Butterfly	Ryan Pini; Papua New Guinea	25.07	Tim Dodd; Australia	25.11	Hong Zhe Sun; Hawaii	25.90
100m Butterfly	Tim Dodd; Australia	55.07	Josh Krogh; Australia	55.67	Ryan Pini; Papua New Guinea	55.70
200m Butterfly	Josh Krogh; Australia	2:02.12	Travis Nederpelt; Australia	2:04.29	Andrew McMillan; New Zealand	2:04.37
200m I.M.	Mitchell Bacon; Australia	2:03.99 CR	Adam Lucas; Australia	2:06.00	Olivier Saminadin; New Caledonia	2:06.16
400m I.M	Adam Lucas; Australia	4:24.57 CR	Mitchell Bacon; Australia	4:25.20	Olivier Saminadin; New Caledonia	4:26.52
400m Free Relay	Australia; Ashley Anderson; Tim Dodd; Adam Lucas; Travis Nederpelt	3:25.57 CR	New Caledonia; Gilles Dumesnil; Laurent Dourche; Cedrick Petre; Olivier Saminadin	3:33.34	New Zealand; Andrew McMillan; Robert Voss; Chris Hotchin; Mark Herring	3:36.03
800m Free Relay	Australia; Ben Denner; Andrew Dyson; Josh Krogh; Nicholas Sprenger	7:37.32	New Zealand; Andrew McMillan; Tom McDonald; Matthew Dodds; Robert Voss	7:53.66	New Caledonia; Olivier Saminadin; Antoine Dahlia; Jean Marie Pouilly; Laurent Dourche	8:00.45
400m Medley Relay	Australia; Matthew Spicer; Luke Trickett; Josh Krogh; Andrew Dyson	3:45.44 CR	New Zealand; Mark Herring; Andrew McMillan; Kieran Daly; Chris Hotchin	4:00.19	New Caledonia; Olivier Saminadin; Olivier Sourmail; Laurent Dourche; Gilles Dumesnil	4:02.38

==== Women ====
Event	Gold		Silver		Bronze	
50m Freestyle	Caroline Pickering; Fiji	26.27	Lisbeth Lenton; Australia	26.51	Teagan Wilkie; Australia	26.67
100m Freestyle	Alison Fitch; New Zealand	56.84	Melissa Mitchell; Australia	56.95	Lisbeth Lenton; Australia	57.09
200m Freestyle	Melissa Mitchell; Australia	2:03.20 CR	Sarah Jackson; New Zealand	2:03.62	Alison Fitch; New Zealand	2:03.63
400m Freestyle	Belinda Wilson; Australia	4:16.87 CR	Jessicah Schipper; Australia	4:19.78	Briody Murphy; Australia	4:21.06
800m Freestyle	Belinda Wilson; Australia	8:48.52 CR	Briody Murphy; Australia	9:01.67	Rebecca Linton; New Zealand	9:01.77
50m Backstroke	Karina Leane; Australia	30.21	Nicole Seah; Australia	30.78	Lisbeth Lenton; Australia	30.89
100m Backstroke	Karina Leane; Australia	1:03.64 CR	Sophie Edington; Australia	1:03.86	Nicole Seah; Australia	1:04.88
200m Backstroke	Tamara Leane; Australia	2:18.45	Karina Leane; Australia	2:19.05	Kim Ono; Hawaii	2:22.54
50m Breaststroke	Kate Young; Australia	33.81	Rebekah Rychvalsky; Australia	34.05	Lara Carroll; Australia	34.18
100m Breaststroke	Kate Young; Australia	1:12.21	Rebekah Rychvalsky; Australia	1:13.24	Lara Carroll; Australia	1:14.43
200m Breaststroke	Kate Young; Australia	2:34.55	Jane Copland; New Zealand	2:38.07	Rebekah Rychvalsky; Australia	2:38.19
50m Butterfly	Lisbeth Lenton; Australia	28.03	Katie Corkran; Australia	28.15	Megan Allan; New Zealand	28.64
100m Butterfly	Jessicah Schipper; Australia	1:00.80 CR	Katie Corkran; Australia	1:01.49	Lisbeth Lenton; Australia	1:03.69
200m Butterfly	Jessicah Schipper; Australia	2:14.11 CR	Charnelle Crossingham; Australia	2:14.90	Katie Corkran; Australia	2:17.85
200m I.M.	Lara Carroll; Australia	2:20.17	Karina Leane; Australia	2:20.20	Charnelle Crossingham; Australia	2:20.96
400m I.M	Charnelle Crossingham; Australia	4:54.14	Lara Carroll; Australia	4:58.90	Karen Tait; New Zealand	5:02.38
400m Free Relay	Australia; Teagan Wilkie; Sophie Edington; Melissa Mitchell; Lisbeth Lenton	3:49.23 CR	New Zealand; Alison Fitch; Karen Tait; Rebecca Linton; Sarah Jackson	3:56.37	New Caledonia; Florence Alaux; Marie-Drohnue Simon; Marqaux Boyd; Aurelia Dubois-Duvivier	4:12.35
800m Free Relay	New Zealand; Sarah Jackson; Rebecca Linton; Karen Tait; Alison Fitch	8:22.62 CR	Australia; Briody Murphy; Belinda Wilson; Tamara Leane; Melissa Mitchell	8:28.16	New Caledonia; Charlotte Robin; Aurelia Dubois-Duvivier; Marqaux Boyd; Florence Alaux	9:17.12
400m Medley Relay	Australia; Karina Leane; Kate Young; Jessicah Schipper; Melissa Mitchell	4:15.78 CR	New Zealand; Megan Allan; Nathalie Bernard; Jane Copland; Alison Fitch	4:30.21	New Caledonia; Marqaux Boyd; Aurelia Dubois-Duvivier; Florence Alaux; Marie-Drohnue Simon	4:49.17

== Overall medal table ==
Rank	Nation	Gold	Silver	Bronze	Total
1	Australia (AUS)	34	31	16	81
2	New Zealand (NZL)	2	6	10	18
3	Papua New Guinea (PNG)	1	0	2	3
4	Fiji (FIJ)	1	0	0	1
5	New Caledonia (NCL)	0	1	8	9
6	Hawaii (HAW)	0	0	2	2
Totals (6 entries)		38	38	38	114
