= Nathan Capp =

New Zealand competitive swimmer

Personal information
- Born: 29 September 1992 (age 34) Tauranga, New Zealand
- Height: 1.86 m (6 ft 1 in)

Sport
- Sport: Swimming
- Strokes: Freestyle / Individual Medley
- Club: Greerton Swimming Club
- Coach: Tai Daniella / Clive Power
Medal record
Men's swimming
Representing New Zealand
Oceania Championships
Gold medal – first place	2014 Auckland	1500 m freestyle
Gold medal – first place	2014 Auckland	400 m individual medley
Silver medal – second place	2014 Auckland	4 × 200 m freestyle

Nathan Capp (born 29 September 1992) is a former competitive swimmer for New Zealand.

Capp attended Otumoetai College and Massey University.

He is a cousin to former New Zealand competitive swimmer, Commonwealth Games and World Champion Moss Burmester.

== Swimming career ==
2013 World championships

Capp made his first senior international team for New Zealand in 2013 when he was selected for the 15th FINA World Championships held in Barcelona, Spain. He swum in the 400 metre individual medley finishing in a time of 4:23.27.

2014 Oceania championships

Capp returned to the New Zealand team the following year with a successful Oceania Championships held in Auckland, New Zealand. Capp claimed individual gold medals in the 1500 metre freestyle (15:38.72) and 400 metre individual medley (5:26.24). He also claimed relay silver in the 4 × 200 metre freestyle relay alongside Isaac Foote, Mathew Myers and Shaun Burnett.

2014 World championships

Later that same year, Capp competed at the 12th FINA World Swimming Championships (25m) held in Doha, Qatar. Capp recorded an 11th-place finish in the 400 metre individual medley in a time of 4:07.70, a 19th-place finish in the 1500 metre freestyle in a time of 14:50.82, and a 26th-place finish in the 400 metre freestyle in a time of 3:46.19.

2015 World championships

Capp competed at the 16th FINA World Championships held in Kazan, Russia. He finished 20th in the 800 metre freestyle in a time of 7:57.61 (a national record for New Zealand), 21st in the 1500 metre freestyle in a time of 15:17.77 and 28th in the 400 metre individual medley in a time of 4:23.00.

Capp is the national record holder for the 1500 metre freestyle in a 50-metre pool in a time of 15:15.50 set in 2015 at New Zealand Championships and the 1500 metre freestyle in a 25-metre pool in a time of 14:38.74 set in 2014 at New Zealand Championships. He was also the first New Zealander eight minutes in the 800 metre freestyle when he went 7:58.30 in 2015.
