= William Benson (swimmer) =

New Zealand swimmer

Personal information
- Nickname: BillBot
- Nationality: New Zealand
- Born: 11 December 1987 (age 38) Hastings, New Zealand
- Height: 1.83 m (6 ft 0 in)
- Weight: 97 kg (214 lb)

Sport
- Country: New Zealand
- Sport: Swimming
- Event(s): Freestyle, Butterfly
- Club: North Shore, Sundevils (NZL)

William Benson (born 11 December 1987 in Hastings) is a New Zealand swimmer, who specialised in freestyle and fly events. He represented New Zealand at the 2008 Summer Olympics in Beijing, and competed as part of the men's national swimming team for the men's 4 × 100 m freestyle relay. Benson joined the team, along with compatriots Cameron Gibson, Mark Herring, and Orinoco Faamausili-Banse, and swam in the third leg of the competition, with an individual split time of 48.65 seconds. He and his swimming team placed sixth in the first heat, and eleventh overall, for a total time of 3:15.41.
