= Matthew Brooks =

American politician

Member of the New Hampshire House of Representatives from the Rockingham 9th district
- Incumbent
- Assumed office December 2026

Personal details
- Party: Republican
- Education: University of New Hampshire

Matthew Brooks is an American politician. A member of the Republican Party, he is the member-elect for the Rockingham 9th district of the New Hampshire House of Representatives.

Brooks attended and graduated from Timberlane High School. After graduating, he attended the University of New Hampshire, earning his bachelor's degree in 2026.
