= 1993 Oceania Swimming Championships =

The 1993 Oceania Swimming Championships were held in Nouméa, New Caledonia, in February 1993. They were organised by Oceania Swimming Association.

== Results ==
=== Men's events ===
Event	Gold		Silver		Bronze	
50 m freestyle	Adam Vary; Australia	23.74	Cameron Anderson; Australia	23.92	Brendan Roser; Australia	24.56
100 m freestyle	Cameron Anderson; Australia	52.12	Adam Vary; Australia	52.61	Brendan Roser; Australia	53.43
200 m freestyle	Daniel Kowalski; Australia	1:55.90	Cameron Anderson; Australia	1:56.00	Martin Davies; Australia	1:59.02
400 m freestyle	Daniel Kowalski; Australia	4:04.95	Brendan Roser; Australia	4:05.73	Martin Davies; Australia	4:12.20
1500 m freestyle	Daniel Kowalski; Australia	15:29.32	Mark Sheppard; Australia	16:22.92		
50 m backstroke	Scott Miller; Australia	27.98	Steven Dewick; Australia	28.04	Simon Beqir; Australia	28.57
100 m backstroke	Scott Miller; Australia	57.95	Simon Beqir; Australia	59.29	Steven Dewick; Australia	59.37
200 m backstroke	Scott Miller; Australia	2:04.63	Simon Beqir; Australia	2:06.04	Steven Dewick; Australia	2:09.00
50 m breaststroke	Damien Bawden; Australia	30.29			Adam Olesen; Australia	31.36
100 m breaststroke	Damien Bawden; Australia	1:06.30	Adam Olesen; Australia	1:08.46		
200 m breaststroke	Damien Bawden; Australia	2:21.50	Adam Olesen; Australia	2:28.25		
50 m butterfly	Scott Miller; Australia	25.82	Adam Vary; Australia	26.27	Matthew Brown; Australia	26.84
100 m butterfly	Scott Miller; Australia	56.67	Matthew Brown; Australia	57.20		
200 m butterfly	Matthew Brown; Australia	2:05.44	Martin Davies; Australia	2:06.19	Hamish Cameron; Australia	2:06.37
200 m individual medley	Hamish Cameron; Australia	2:09.75			Simon Beqir; Australia	2:13.65
400 m individual medley	Hamish Cameron; Australia	4:33.93	Mark Sheppard; Australia	4:38.42		
4×100 m freestyle relay	Australia; Cameron Anderson; Brendan Roser; Martin Davies; Adam Vary	3:37.40				
4×200 m freestyle relay	Australia; Matthew Brown; Brendan Roser; Cameron Anderson; Scott Miller	7:51.13				
4×100 m medley relay	Australia; Scott Miller; Brendan Roser; Matthew Brown; Cameron Anderson					

Legend: CR – Championship record; NR – National record

=== Women's events ===
Event	Gold		Silver		Bronze	
50 m freestyle	Sarah Ryan; Australia	26.89			Susan Smith; Australia	27.05
100 m freestyle	Sarah Ryan; Australia	57.66	Susan Smith; Australia	58.00		
200 m freestyle	Penny O'Connell; Australia	2:05.38	Dionne Bainbridge; Australia	2:06.46	Chloe Flutter; Australia	2:07.28
400 m freestyle	Dionne Bainbridge; Australia	4:21.49	Chloe Flutter; Australia	4:21.62	Penny O'Connell; Australia	4:21.65
800 m freestyle	Chloe Flutter; Australia	8:55.19	Belinda Curtin; Australia	9:14.53		
50 m backstroke	Meredith Smith; Australia	30.72	Jillian Gowans; Australia	31.42		
100 m backstroke	Meredith Smith; Australia	1:04.59	Jillian Gowans; Australia	1:05.97		
200 m backstroke	Meredith Smith; Australia	2:18.98	Jillian Gowans; Australia	2:19.60		
50 m breaststroke	Rebecca Brown; Australia	32.96	Tammy Alder; Australia	34.66		
100 m breaststroke	Rebecca Brown; Australia	1:10.49	Tammy Alder; Australia	1:14.39		
200 m breaststroke	Rebecca Brown; Australia	2:28.24; NR	Tammy Alder; Australia	2:39.68		
50 m butterfly	Angela Kennedy; Australia	28.49	Sarah Ryan; Australia	29.45		
100 m butterfly	Angela Kennedy; Australia	1:03.40	Nichola Yates; Australia	1:04.45	Tammy Alder; Australia	1:04.91
200 m butterfly	Nichola Yates; Australia	2:18.65	Angela Kennedy; Australia	2:20.86	Tammy Alder; Australia	2:23.09
200 m individual medley	Tammy Alder; Australia	2:19.49	Angela Kennedy; Australia	2:22.66	Meredith Smith; Australia	2:24.91
400 m individual medley	Angela Kennedy; Australia	4:57.29	Meredith Smith; Australia	4:57.40		
4×100 m freestyle relay	Australia; Kim O'Sullivan; Penny O'Connell; Sarah Ryan; Susan Smith	3:59.12				
4×200 m freestyle relay	Australia; Dionne Bainbridge; Chloe Flutter; Penny O'Connell; Susan Smith	8:33.29				
4×100 m medley relay						

Legend: CR – Championship record; NR – National record

== See also ==
- 1993 in swimming
