= Orinoco Faamausili-Banse =

New Zealand swimmer

Personal information
- Full name: Orinoco Faamausili-Banse-Prince
- Nationality: New Zealand
- Born: 31 July 1990 (age 36) Auckland, New Zealand
- Height: 1.85 m (6 ft 1 in)
- Weight: 83 kg (183 lb)

Sport
- Sport: Swimming
- Event: Freestyle
- Club: Mt Eden (NZL)
- Coached by: Glenn Hamblyn
Medal record
Men's swimming
Representing New Zealand
World Youth Championships
Gold medal – first place	2008 Monterrey	50 m freestyle

Orinoco Faamausili-Banse-Prince (born 31 July 1990 in Auckland) is a New Zealand swimmer of Samoan heritage, who specialised in freestyle events. He represented New Zealand at the 2008 Summer Olympics in Beijing, and competed as part of the men's national swimming team for the men's 4 × 100 m freestyle relay. Faamausili-Banse joined the team, along with compatriots Cameron Gibson, Mark Herring, and Willy Benson, and swam in the final leg of the competition, with an individual split time of 48.96 seconds. He and his swimming team placed sixth in the first heat, and eleventh overall, for a total time of 3:15.41.

Faamausili-Banse also won a gold medal, and set a national record for the 50 m freestyle, with a time of 22.37 seconds, at the 2008 FINA Youth World Swimming Championships in Monterrey, Mexico.
