= Merindah Dingjan =

Australian swimmer

Personal information
- Born: 15 January 1991 (age 35) Arnhem, Netherlands
- Height: 1.83 m (6 ft 0 in)

Sport
- Sport: Swimming
- Club: Southside Welsy/AIS
Medal record
Representing Australia
World Championships
Bronze medal – third place	2011 Shanghai	4×100 m medley

Merinda Dingjan (born 15 January 1991) is an Australian swimmer who won a bronze medal in the 4 × 100 m medley at the 2011 World Aquatics Championships.

She was born in Arnhem, Netherlands, but later moved to Canberra.
