= Julian Layton =

Julian David Layton (1904–1989), born Julian David Loewenstein, was a banker and German Jew born in England to parents who had emigrated from Frankfurt in 1893 with the family firm of Loewenstein-Hoskins. The Loewenstein family had close family ties to the Rothschild family in Frankfurt and served as the Rothschild's stockbrokers. This relationship later became essential in the rescuing of thousands of Jewish refugees throughout the course of the Second World War.

== Biography ==
Layton was educated at University College School before being sent to complete his education at the Ecole de Commerce in Lausanne, Switzerland and he was fluent in English, French and German. Layton spent two years travelling between Frankfurt and Paris before becoming a stockbroker and member of the London Stock Exchange and later became partner in the family business R.Layton and Co. He changed the family name from Loewenstein to Layton in August 1921.

== Role in the war ==
On a business trip in Australia in 1936 he received a cable from Otto Schiff, nephew of the banker Jacob Schiff requesting that he negotiated with the Australian government to allow 500 Jewish refugees to enter. Eventually, the Australian government accepted provided each individual was interviewed and personally recommended by Layton himself, a process which took nine months to complete.

Layton was also instrumental in the running of the Kitchener Camp which was a military camp used to house Jewish refugees. Layton dealt directly with Adolf Eichmann in Vienna to secure the release of thousands of Jewish refugees and on the afternoon of the Kristallnacht Layton received a call from Eichmann himself warning him to avoid the Jewish sector of Vienna as his death would have caused enormous diplomatic tension. Layton was involved in numerous other rescue missions such as the 'Cedar Boys,' who were smuggled out of Nazi-occupied territory due to the co-operation between Layton and Dorothy de Rothschild. In total it is estimated that Layton helped to save around 4000 Jewish refugees who otherwise would have remained under Nazi control.

== Post-war ==
After the war, Layton successfully continued in his partnership at the family firm whilst living in Hampstead meanwhile, he worked for the Home Office. In 1941 he was sent by the British government to Australia to diplomatically resolve the HMT Dunera scandal and successfully won compensation for the maltreatment of refugees aboard the ship.
