= Lorna Tonks =

Australian swimmer

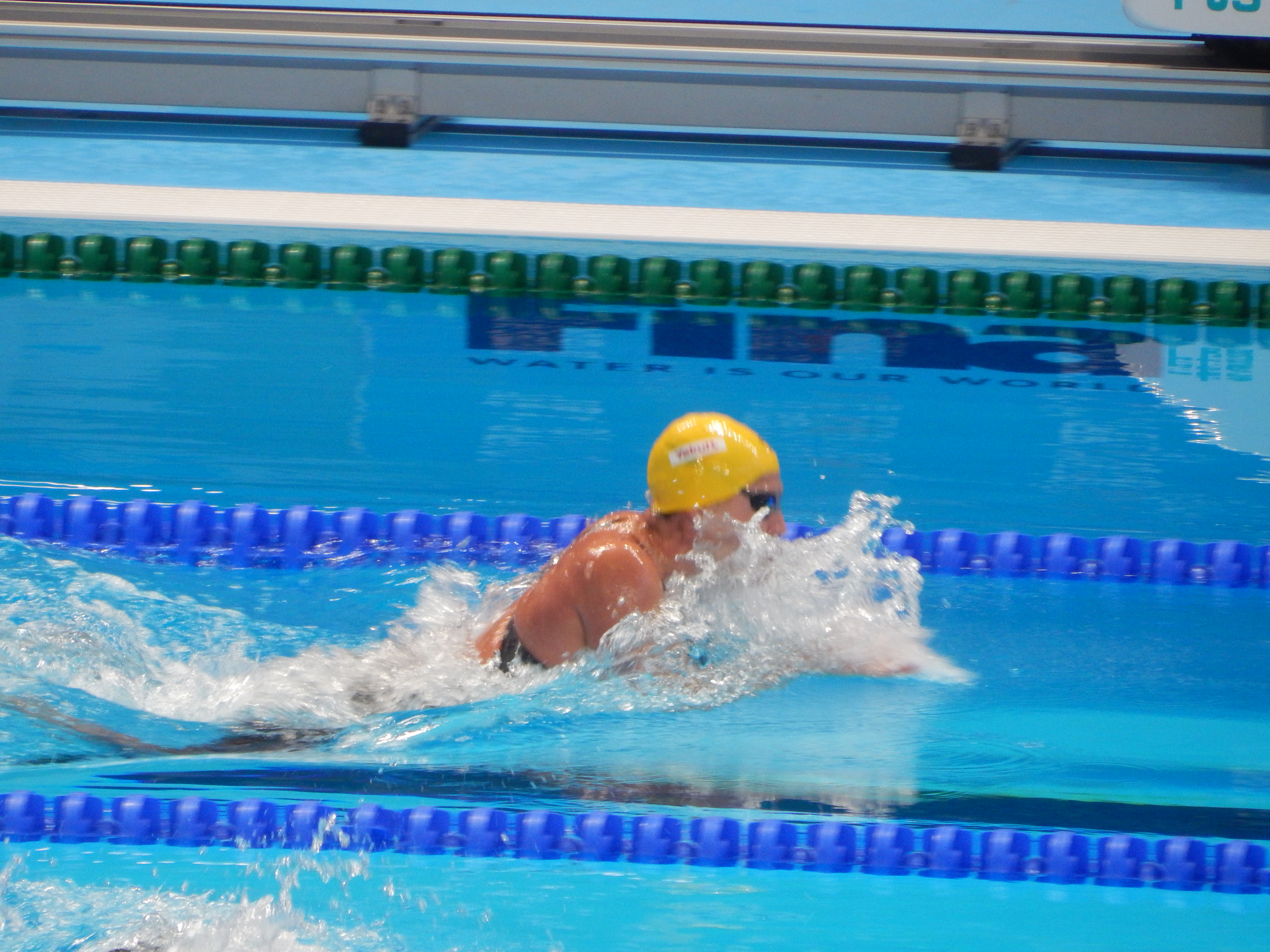
- Kazan 2015

Personal information
- Full name: Lorna Tonks
- National team: Australia
- Born: 8 December 1988 (age 37) Nottinghamshire, England
- Height: 1.69 m (5 ft 7 in)
- Weight: 60 kg (132 lb)

Sport
- Sport: Swimming
- Strokes: Breaststroke
- Club: Yeronga Park
- Coach: Rob Van Der Zant
Medal record
Women's swimming
Representing Australia
World Championships (LC)
Bronze medal – third place	2015 Kazan	4×100 m medley
Pan Pacific Championships
Gold medal – first place	2014 Gold Coast	4×100 m medley
Commonwealth Games
Gold medal – first place	2014 Glasgow	4×100 m medley
Silver medal – second place	2014 Glasgow	100 m breaststroke

Lorna Tonks (born 8 December 1988) is an English-born Australian breaststroke swimmer. In 2014, she was a member of the 4×100-metre medley teams that won gold medals at the Commonwealth Games and Pan Pacific Championships.
