= Mark Herring (swimmer) =

New Zealand swimmer (born 1984)

Personal information
- National team: New Zealand
- Born: 5 December 1984 (age 41)

Sport
- Sport: Swimming
- Strokes: Freestyle
Medal record
Men's swimming
Representing New Zealand
Australian Youth Olympic Festival
Bronze medal – third place	2003 Sydney	50 m freestyle
Oceania Swimming Championships
Gold medal – first place	2008 Christchurch	50 m freestyle
Gold medal – first place	2008 Christchurch	100 m freestyle
Gold medal – first place	2008 Christchurch	4x100 m freestyle
Silver medal – second place	2006 Queensland	4x100 m freestyle
Silver medal – second place	2002 Nouméa	4x100 m medley
Bronze medal – third place	2002 Nouméa	4x100 m freestyle
Bronze medal – third place	2006 Queensland	50 m freestyle

Mark Herring (born 5 December 1984) is an international swimmer and New Zealand Olympiad 1041 who competed for New Zealand in the 2008 Summer Olympics in the 4 × 100 metre freestyle relay, describing it as "a highlight of his swimming career." He competed in the 50 metre and the 100 metre freestyle events at the 2007 World Aquatics Championships. He has competed in the Oceania Swimming Championships in the 50 metere freestyle, 100 metre freestyle, and 4x100 metere freestyle and has won a total of 7 medals, 3 gold, 2 silver, and 2 bronze. His father, Colin Herring, had competed for New Zealand in two swimming events at the 1972 Summer Olympics.
