= Elizabeth Coster =

New Zealand swimmer (born 1982)

Personal information
- Full name: Elizabeth Mary Coster
- National team: New Zealand
- Born: 11 December 1982 (age 43) Auckland, New Zealand
- Height: 1.76 m (5 ft 9 in)
- Weight: 65 kg (143 lb)

Sport
- Sport: Swimming
- Strokes: Backstroke, butterfly
- Club: North Shore Swim Club
- Coach: Thomas Ansorg

Elizabeth Mary Coster (born 11 December 1982) is a New Zealand former swimmer, who specialises in backstroke and butterfly events. She helped the New Zealand team to pull off a fourth-place effort and broke a New Zealand record of 4:06.30 in the medley relay at the 2006 Commonwealth Games in Melbourne, Australia.

Coster made her first New Zealand team at the 2004 Summer Olympics in Athens, where she competed in the 100 m butterfly. Swimming in heat two, she edged out Singapore's Joscelin Yeo to take a third spot by two-tenths of a second (0.20), but shared a twenty-third place tie with Sweden's Johanna Sjöberg in 1:00.61. Coster also teamed up with Hannah McLean, Alison Fitch, and Annabelle Carey in the 4 × 100 m medley relay. She swam a butterfly leg in heat one with a split of 1:00.38, but the New Zealand team settled for sixth place and thirteenth overall in a final time of 4:10.37.

At the 2008 Summer Olympics in Beijing, Coster shortened her program, swimming only in the 100 m backstroke. She cleared a FINA A-standard entry time of 1:00.93 from the Olympic trials in Auckland. She posted a time of 1:00.66 to take a fifteenth seed in the top 16 places from the evening's preliminary heats. Followed by the next morning's session, Coster fell short in her bid for the final, as she finished her semifinal run with a slowest time of 1:01.45.
