= Oceania Swimming Championships =

The Oceania Swimming Championships are currently held every 2 years, in even years. They are organized by the Oceania Swimming Association, and feature teams representing countries and islands from that region.

== Locations ==
Year	Edition	Host city	Country	Dates
1993	1	Nouméa	New Caledonia	
1997	2	Brisbane	Australia	
2000	3	Christchurch	New Zealand	June 21–24
2002	4	Nouméa	New Caledonia	June 9–16
2004	5	Suva	Fiji	May 15–19
2006	6	Queensland	Australia	July 7–16
2008	7	Christchurch	New Zealand	June 5–8
2010	8	Apia	Samoa	June 21–27
2012	9	Nouméa	New Caledonia	May 28–June 2
2014	10	Auckland	New Zealand	May 20–23
2016	11	Suva	Fiji	June 21–26
2018	12	Port Moresby	Papua New Guinea	June 24–June 29
2024	13	Gold Coast	Australia	April 21–24
2026	14	Suva	Fiji	May 8–13

== See also ==
- Pan Pacific Swimming Championships
- Swimming at the Pacific Games
- Swimming at the Commonwealth Games
- List of swimming competitions
