= Oceania Aquatics =

Competitive swimming organization in Oceania

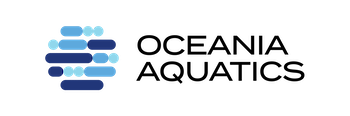
- Sport: Aquatic Sports
- Membership: 15 federations
- Affiliation: World Aquatics
- President: Matthew Dunn

Official website
- oceaniaaquatics.org

Oceania Aquatics, formerly known as Oceania Swimming Association, is the continental governing body recognised by World Aquatics, for the national governing bodies of swimming, open water swimming, diving, water polo, synchronised swimming and masters swimming in Oceania.

The body was established in January 1991 during the 1991 World Aquatics Championships in Perth, Australia. At the OSA Congress held in June 2008, Dennis Miller of Fiji was elected President of the organization. The body will next meet during the 2009 World Championships in Rome, Italy.

The OSA also tracks and maintains the Oceania Records.

== Member federations ==
There are currently 15 member federations of Oceania Aquatics (listed here with their World Aquatics abbreviation following their country name):

- American Samoa (ASA) – American Samoa Swimming Association
- Australia (AUS) – Swimming Australia
- Cook Islands (COK) – Cook Islands Aquatics Federation
- Federated States of Micronesia (FSM) – Federated States of Micronesia Swimming Association
- Fiji (FIJ) – Fiji Swimming
- Guam (GUM) – Guam Swimming Federation
- Marshall Islands (MIL) – Marshall Islands Swimming Federation
- New Zealand (NZL) – Swimming New Zealand
- Northern Mariana Islands (NMA) – Northern Mariana Islands Swimming Federation
- Palau (PLW) – Palau Swimming Association
- Papua New Guinea (PNG) – Papua New Guinea Swimming
- Samoa (SAM) – Samoa Swimming Federation
- Solomon Islands (SOL) – Solomon Islands Swimming Federation
- Tonga (TGA) – Tonga Swimming Association
- Vanuatu (VAN) – Vanuatu Aquatics Federation

== Competitions ==
The main competitions that the Oceania Swimming Association runs:

- Oceania Swimming Championships (biannual, last held in 2018), which includes Open Water Swimming and Synchronized Swimming
- Oceania Masters Championships
