= Cameron Gibson =

New Zealand swimmer (born 1982)

Personal information
- Full name: Cameron Michael Gibson
- Nickname: Cam
- Born: 14 August 1982 (age 43) Auckland, New Zealand
Medal record
Men's swimming
Representing New Zealand
Commonwealth Games
Bronze medal – third place	2006 Melbourne	200m backstroke

Cameron Michael Gibson (born 14 August 1982 in Auckland) is a New Zealand swimming competitor. He won a bronze medal in the 200m backstroke at the 2006 Commonwealth Games in a time of 2:00.72 minutes.

He competed at the 2004 Summer Olympics and the 2008 Summer Olympics. In the latter he swam the final, freestyle, leg (47.00) for the New Zealand team which finish fifth in the final of Men's 4 × 100 metre medley relay.
