= List of flag bearers for Guam at the Olympics =

Guam at the Olympics
- IOC code: GUM
- NOC: Guam National Olympic Committee
- Website: www.oceaniasport.com/guam/
- Medals: Gold 0 Silver 0 Bronze 0 Total 0

Summer appearances
- 1988; 1992; 1996; 2000; 2004; 2008; 2012; 2016; 2020; 2024

Winter appearances
- 1988; 1992–2022; 2026

This is a list of flag bearers who have represented Guam at the Olympics.

Flag bearers carry the national flag of their country at the opening ceremony of the Olympic Games.

#	Event year	Season	Flag bearer	Sport
1	1988	Winter	Judd Bankert	Biathlon
2	1988	Summer	Ricardo Blas	Judo
3	1992	Summer	Frank Flores	Swimming
4	1996	Summer	Patrick Sagisi	Swimming
5	2000	Summer	Melissa Lynn Fejeran	Weightlifting
6	2004	Summer	Jeffrey Cobb	Wrestling
7	2008	Summer	Ricardo Blas Jr.	Judo
8	2012	Summer	Maria Dunn	Wrestling
9	2016	Summer	Benjamin Schulte	Swimming
10	2020	Summer	Joshter Andrew	Judo
10	2020	Summer	Regine Tugade	Athletics
11	2024	Summer	Rckaela Aquino	Wrestling
11	2024	Summer	Joseph Green	Athletics

== See also ==
- Guam at the Olympics
