= Guam at the 1992 Summer Olympics =

- IOC code: GUM
- NOC: Guam National Olympic Committee

in Barcelona
- Competitors: 22 in 8 sports
- Flag bearer: Frank Flores
- Medals: Gold 0 Silver 0 Bronze 0 Total 0

Summer Olympics appearances (overview)
- 1988; 1992; 1996; 2000; 2004; 2008; 2012; 2016; 2020; 2024; 2028

Guam competed at the 1992 Summer Olympics in Barcelona, Spain. 22 competitors, 16 men and 6 women, took part in 27 events in 8 sports. As of 2022, it is Guam's largest Olympic delegation.

== Competitors ==
The following is the list of number of competitors in the Games.

Sport	Men	Women	Total
Archery	1	0	1
Athletics	1	1	2
Cycling	5	1	6
Judo	1	1	2
Sailing	1	1	2
Swimming	5	2	7
Weightlifting	1	–	1
Wrestling	1	–	11
Total	16	6	22

== Archery ==
Men

Athlete	Event	Ranking round		Round of 32	Round of 16	Quarterfinals	Semifinals	Final / BM	
Athlete	Event	Score	Seed	Opposition Score	Opposition Score	Opposition Score	Opposition Score	Opposition Score	Rank
Luis Cabral	Individual	1147	72	Did not advance					

== Athletics ==
Men
Track and road events

Athlete	Event	Heats		Quarterfinal		Semifinal		Final	
Athlete	Event	Result	Rank	Result	Rank	Result	Rank	Result	Rank
Richard Bentley	400 metres hurdles	57.04	44	—N/a		Did not advance			

Women
Track and road events

Athlete	Event	Heats		Quarterfinal		Semifinal		Final	
Athlete	Event	Result	Rank	Result	Rank	Result	Rank	Result	Rank
Jen Allred	Marathon	—N/a						3:14:45	36

== Cycling ==
Six cyclists, five men and one woman, represented Guam in 1992.

=== Road ===
Men

Athlete	Event	Time	Rank
Jazy Garcia	Road race	DNF	
Manuel García	Road race	DNF	
Martin Santos	Road race	DNF	
Wil Yamamoto; Jazy Garcia; Manuel García; Martin Santos	Team time trial	2:34:41	25

Women

Athlete	Event	Time	Rank
Margaret Bean	Road race	2:29:22	52

=== Track ===
Pursuit

Athlete	Event	Qualification		Quarterfinals	Semifinals	Final	
Athlete	Event	Time	Rank	Opposition Time	Opposition Time	Opposition Time	Rank
Manuel García	Men's individual pursuit	5:03.997	24	Did not advance			
Margaret Bean	Women's individual pursuit	Overtaken		Did not advance			
Jazy Garcia; Manuel García; Andrew Martin; Martin Santos	Men's team pursuit	5:23.366	20	Did not advance			

== Judo ==
Men

Athlete	Event	Round of 64	Round of 32	Round of 16	Quarterfinals	Semifinals	Repechage			Final	
Athlete	Event	Round of 64	Round of 32	Round of 16	Quarterfinals	Semifinals	Round 1	Round 2	Round 3	Final	
Athlete	Event	Opposition Result	Opposition Result	Opposition Result	Opposition Result	Opposition Result	Opposition Result	Opposition Result	Opposition Result	Opposition Result	Rank
Atif Muhammad Hussain	+95 kg	—N/a	Ogawa (JPN); L Hansoku-make	Did not advance							

Women

Athlete	Event	Round of 32	Round of 16	Quarterfinals	Semifinals	Repechage			Final	
Athlete	Event	Round of 32	Round of 16	Quarterfinals	Semifinals	Round 1	Round 2	Round 3	Final	
Athlete	Event	Opposition Result	Opposition Result	Opposition Result	Opposition Result	Opposition Result	Opposition Result	Opposition Result	Opposition Result	Rank
Erin Lum	66 kg	Bye	Schreiber (GER); L Ippon	Did not advance		Martinel (ARG); L Ippon	Did not advance			

== Sailing ==
Men

Athlete	Event	Race										Net points	Final rank
Athlete	Event	1	2	3	4	5	6	7	8	9	10	Net points	Final rank
Jan Iriarte	Lechner A-390	47	45	46	39	45	45	44	48	46	~~51~~	405	41

Women

Athlete	Event	Race										Net points	Final rank
Athlete	Event	1	2	3	4	5	6	7	8	9	10	Net points	Final rank
Linda Yeomans	Lechner A-390	30	~~31~~	29	31	30	31	31	30	27	31	270	24

== Swimming ==
Men

Athlete	Event	Heats		Final A/B	
Athlete	Event	Time	Rank	Time	Rank
Glenn Diaz	100 metre breaststroke	1:10.32	51	Did not advance	
Glenn Diaz	200 metre breaststroke	2:34.65	46	Did not advance	
Frank Flores	200 metre freestyle	2:00.48	45	Did not advance	
Ray Flores	100 metre butterfly	1:01.10	62	Did not advance	
Adrian Romero	50 metre freestyle	25.12	54	Did not advance	
Adrian Romero	100 metre freestyle	54.77	59	Did not advance	
Patrick Sagisi	50 metre freestyle	24.78	52	Did not advance	
Patrick Sagisi	100 metre freestyle	53.90	55	Did not advance	
Patrick Sagisi	100 metre backstroke	1:01.84	46	Did not advance	
Patrick Sagisi	100 metre butterfly	58.08	49	Did not advance	
Adrian Romero; Ray Flores; Frank Flores; Patrick Sagisi	4 × 100 metre freestyle relay	3:42.31	16	Did not advance	
Patrick Sagisi; Glenn Diaz; Ray Flores; Adrian Romero	4 × 100 metre medley relay	4:07.98	21	Did not advance	

Women

Athlete	Event	Heats		Final A/B	
Athlete	Event	Time	Rank	Time	Rank
Tammie Kaae	100 metre breaststroke	1:16.78	36	Did not advance	
Tammie Kaae	200 metre individual medley	2:36.31	42	Did not advance	
Barbara Pexa	100 metre breaststroke	1:17.71	37	Did not advance	
Barbara Pexa	200 metre breaststroke	2:47.27	36	Did not advance	

== Weightlifting ==
Athlete	Event	Snatch		Clean & jerk		Total	Rank
Athlete	Event	Result	Rank	Result	Rank	Total	Rank
Edgar Molinos	75 kg	95.0	31	125.0	30	220.0	30

== Wrestling ==
Freestyle

Athlete	Event	Group Stage						Final	
Athlete	Event	Opposition Result	Opposition Result	Opposition Result	Opposition Result	Opposition Result	Rank	Opposition Result	Rank
Vincent Pangelinan	48 kg	Vanni (USA); L 0–16	Rahmati (IRI); L fall	Did not advance			9	Did not advance	
