= List of Guamanian records in swimming =

The Guamanian records in swimming are the fastest ever performances of swimmers from Guam, which are recognised and ratified by the Guam Swimming Federation.

All records were set in finals unless noted otherwise.

== Long Course (50 m) ==
=== Men ===
Event	Time		Name	Club	Date	Meet	Location	Ref
50 m freestyle	23.54		Christopher Duenas	Guam	6 December 2009	East Asian Games	Kowloon, Hong Kong	
100 m freestyle	51.50	h	Jagger Stephens	Guam	5 August 2015	World Championships	Kazan, Russia	
200 m freestyle	1:53.88		Ken Barcinas	Tsunami	7 September 2014	Japan Inter College Championships	Japan	
400 m freestyle	4:06.89	h	Jonathan Sakovich	Guam	23 September 1988	Olympic Games	Seoul, South Korea	
800 m freestyle	8:45.80		Benjamin Schulte	Guam	10 December 2011	Queensland Championships	Brisbane, Australia	
1500 m freestyle	16:26.77	h	Jonathan Sakovich	Guam	24 September 1988	Olympic Games	Seoul, South Korea	
50m backstroke	28.38	h	Jagger Stephens	Guam	6 July 2015	Pacific Games	Port Moresby, Papua New Guinea	
100m backstroke	1:00.15		Patrick Sagisi	Guam	21 September 1991	South Pacific Games	Port Moresby, Papua New Guinea	
200m backstroke	2:13.46		Ken Barcinas	Tsunami	10 April 2010	All Island Invitational	Hagåtña, Guam	
50m breaststroke	28.73	h	Benjamin Schulte	Guam	23 July 2019	World Championships	Gwangju, South Korea	
100m breaststroke	1:03.29	h	Benjamin Schulte	Guam	6 August 2016	Olympic Games	Rio de Janeiro, Brazil	
200m breaststroke	2:21.45		Benjamin Schulte	Guam	19 February 2016	-	Bahamas	
50m butterfly	25.56	h, †	Daniel O'Keeffe	Guam	21 September 2000	Olympic Games	Sydney, Australia	
100m butterfly	56.05	h	Daniel O'Keeffe	Guam	21 September 2000	Olympic Games	Sydney, Australia	
100m butterfly	55.05	ratified but later rescinded	Daniel O'Keeffe	Guam	1 January 2000			
200m butterfly	2:12.11		Souju Usui	-	5 April 2014	-	Hagåtña, Guam	
200m butterfly	2:11.65	not ratified	James Hendrix	Tsunami	13 August 2021	Kanto Championships	Japan	
200m individual medley	2:09.22		Benjamin Schulte	Guam	9 July 2015	Pacific Games	Port Moresby, Papua New Guinea	
400m individual medley	4:39.11		Benjamin Schulte	Guam	7 July 2015	Pacific Games	Port Moresby, Papua New Guinea	
4×50m freestyle relay	1:40.10		Ken Barcinas; Tasi Limtiaco; Tetsuya Iijima; Jagger Stephens	Tsunami	30 May 2015	-	Hagåtña, Guam	
4×100m freestyle relay	3:38.56		Christopher Duenas; Tanner Poppe; Benjamin Schulte; Jagger Stephens	Guam	6 July 2015	Pacific Games	Port Moresby, Papua New Guinea	
4×200m freestyle relay	8:09.39		Benjamin Schulte (1:59.26); Tommy Joe Imazu; Christopher Duenas; Jagger Stephens	Guam	7 July 2015	Pacific Games	Port Moresby, Papua New Guinea	
4×50m medley relay	1:54.54		Ken Barcinas; Tetsuya Iijima; Jagger Stephens; Alejandro Cruz-Atoigue	Tsunami	7 March 2015	-	Hagåtña, Guam	
4×100m medley relay	4:07.98	h	Patrick Sagisi; Adrian Romero; Glenn Diaz; Ray Flores	Guam	31 July 1992	Olympic Games	Barcelona, Spain	

Legend: # – Record awaiting ratification by Guam Swimming Federation; WR – World record; OC – Oceanian record;
Records not set in finals: h – heat; sf – semifinal; r – relay 1st leg; rh – relay heat 1st leg; b – B final; † – en route to final mark; so – swim-off; tt – time trial

=== Women ===
Event	Time		Name	Club	Date	Meet	Location	Ref
50m freestyle	27.44	h	Mia Lee	Guam	22 November 2023	Pacific Games	Honiara, Solomon Islands	
100m freestyle	1:00.87		Manami Iijima	Tsunami	22 August 2007	Japan		
200m freestyle	2:12.04		Manami Iijima	Guam	8 January 2009	Pan Pacific Junior Championships	Yona, Guam	
400m freestyle	4:36.81		Misaki Iijima	Tsunami	16 October 2010	-	Hagåtña, Guam	
800m freestyle	9:34.85		Misaki Iijima	Tsunami	20 February 2010	-	Hagåtña, Guam	
1500m freestyle	18:49.54		Samantha Hon	Tsunami	31 March 2007	-	Saipan, Northern Mariana Islands	
50m backstroke	31.52		Misaki Ijima	Tsunami	18 February 2012	-	Hagåtña, Guam	
100m backstroke	1:07.74		Misaki Iijima	Tsunami	18 February 2012	-	Hagåtña, Guam	
200m backstroke	2:26.75		Misaki Iijima	Tsunami	27 May 2011	Guam Championships	Hagåtña, Guam	
50m breaststroke	33.35		Pilar Shimizu	Guam	8 July 2015	Pacific Games	Port Moresby, Papua New Guinea	
100m breaststroke	1:15.76	h	Pilar Shimizu	Guam	29 July 2012	Olympic Games	London, United Kingdom	
200m breaststroke	2:46.81		Barbara Pexa	Manhoben	21 September 1991	South Pacific Games	Port Moresby, Papua New Guinea	
50m butterfly	29.65		Samantha Hon	-	1 April 2017	-	Hagåtña, Guam	
100m butterfly	1:06.71		Amaya Bollinger	Guam	23 April 2024	Oceania Championships	Gold Coast, Australia	
200m butterfly	2:32.36		Manami Iijima	Tsunami	1 June 2007	Guam Championships	Hagåtña, Guam	
200m individual medley	2:32.75		Misaki Iijima	Tsunami	30 January 2010	-	Hagåtña, Guam	
200m individual medley	2:29.99	ratified but later rescinded	Xenavee Pangelinan	SSC	30 December 1999	-	Hagåtña, Guam	
400m individual medley	5:22.10		Misaki Iijima	Tsunami	30 January 2010	-	Hagåtña, Guam	
400m individual medley	5:14.93	ratified but later rescinded	Xenavee Pangelinan	SCC	7 January 2000	-	Hagåtña, Guam	
4×50m freestyle relay	2:00.21		Misaki Iijima; Madison Packbier; Samantha Hon; Leilani Koiwa	Tsunami	24 January 2015	-	Hagåtña, Guam	
4×100m freestyle relay	4:18.06		Tina Ching; Annie Dierking; Barbara Gayle; Veronica Cummings	Guam	12 December 1987	South Pacific Games	Nouméa, New Caledonia	
4×200m freestyle relay	9:26.80		Manami Iijima; Misaki Iijima; Allie Lai; Rione Ema	Guam	9 January 2009	Pan Pacific Junior Championships	Yona, Guam	
4×100m medley relay	2:15.71		Sheila Cummings; Tammie Kaae; Barbara Gayle; Veronica Cummings	Manukai Athletic Club	1 April 1989			
4×100m medley relay	4:48.27		Kellie Kaae; Barbara Pexa; Tammie Kaae; Claudia Clement	Guam	12 September 1991			

Legend: # – Record awaiting ratification by Guam Swimming Federation; WR – World record; OC – Oceanian record;
Records not set in finals: h – heat; sf – semifinal; r – relay 1st leg; rh – relay heat 1st leg; b – B final; † – en route to final mark; so – swim-off; tt – time trial

=== Mixed relay ===
Event	Time		Name	Club	Date	Meet	Location	Ref
4×50 m freestyle relay	1:44.98		Pilar Shimizu (28.06); Mineri Gomez (29.36); Christopher Duenas (24.60); Jagger Stephens (22.96)	Guam	9 July 2015	Pacific Games	Port Moresby, Papua New Guinea	
4×100 m freestyle relay (Note: 4×50m Medley Relay by Guam Swimming Federation source; a typo)	3:52.29	h	Israel Poppe (54.12); James Hendrix (53.87); Amaya Bollinger (1:03.04); Mia Lee (1:01.26)	Guam	17 February 2024	World Championships	Doha, Qatar	
4×50 m medley relay	1:59.87		Jagger Stephens; Pilar Shimizu; Christopher Duenas; Amanda Poppe	Guam	July 2015 (Note: 9 July 2014 by federation source, a typo)	Pacific Games	Port Moresby, Papua New Guinea	
4×100 m medley relay	4:30.74	h	James Hendrix (1:04.34); Israel Poppe (1:11.84); Amaya Bollinger (1:13.33); Mia Lee (1:01.23)	Guam	14 February 2024	World Championships	Doha, Qatar	

Legend: # – Record awaiting ratification by Guam Swimming Federation; WR – World record; OC – Oceanian record;
Records not set in finals: h – heat; so – swim-off

== Short Course (25 m) ==
=== Men ===
Event	Time		Name	Club	Date	Meet	Location	Ref
50m freestyle	23.62	rh	Benjamin Schulte	Guam	12 December 2018	World Championships	Hangzhou, China	
100m freestyle	52.00	h	Christopher Duenas	Guam	15 December 2012	World Championships	Istanbul, Turkey	
200m freestyle	2:00.16	h	Johnny Rivera	Guam	12 December 2012	World Championships	Istanbul, Turkey	
400m freestyle	4:31.03	h	Tommy Imazu	Guam	5 December 2014	World Championships	Doha, Qatar	
800m freestyle	9:31.82	†	Mark Imazu	Guam	20 December 2021	World Championships	Abu Dhabi, United Arab Emirates	
1500m freestyle	17:59.68		Mark Imazu	Guam	20 December 2021	World Championships	Abu Dhabi, United Arab Emirates	
50m backstroke	31.36	h	Santiago Poppe	Guam	23 September 2017	Asian Indoor and Martial Arts Games	Ashgabat, Turkmenistan	
100m backstroke	1:12.30	h	Tommy Imazu	Guam	3 December 2014	World Championships	Doha, Qatar	
200m backstroke	2:40.53	h	Tanner Poppe	Guam	7 December 2014	World Championships	Doha, Qatar	
50m breaststroke	28.05	h	Benjamin Schulte	Guam	15 December 2018	World Championships	Hangzhou, China	
100m breaststroke	1:02.01	h	Benjamin Schulte	Guam	11 December 2018	World Championships	Hangzhou, China	
200m breaststroke	2:51.04	h	Tanner Poppe	Guam	5 December 2014	World Championships	Doha, Qatar	
50m butterfly	26.92	h	Christopher Duenas	Guam	5 December 2014	World Championships	Doha, Qatar	
100m butterfly	1:02.06	h	Tanner Poppe	Guam	23 September 2017	Asian Indoor and Martial Arts Games	Ashgabat, Turkmenistan	
200 m butterfly								
100 m individual medley								
200m individual medley	2:28.23	h	Tommy Imazu	Guam	5 December 2014	World Championships	Doha, Qatar	
400 m individual medley								
4×50 m freestyle relay								
4×100 m freestyle relay								
4×200 m freestyle relay								
4×50 m medley relay								
4×100 m medley relay								

Legend: # – Record awaiting ratification by Guam Swimming Federation; WR – World record; OC – Oceanian record;
Records not set in finals: h – heat; sf – semifinal; r – relay 1st leg; rh – relay heat 1st leg; b – B final; † – en route to final mark; so – swim-off; tt – time trial

=== Women ===
Event	Time		Name	Club	Date	Meet	Location	Ref
50m freestyle	29.42	h	Michelle Ysrael	Guam	18 December 2010	World Championships	Dubai, United Arab Emirates	
100m freestyle	1:02.37	h	Pilar Shimizu	Guam	16 December 2010	World Championships	Dubai, United Arab Emirates	
200m freestyle	2:23.99	h	Danielle Atoigue	Guam	16 December 2012	World Championships	Istanbul, Turkey	
400 m freestyle								
800 m freestyle								
1500 m freestyle								
50m backstroke	34.67	h	Amanda Poppe	Guam	23 September 2017	Asian Indoor and Martial Arts Games	Ashgabat, Turkmenistan	
100m backstroke	1:16.35	h	Amanda Poppe	Guam	24 September 2017	Asian Indoor and Martial Arts Games	Ashgabat, Turkmenistan	
200 m backstroke								
50m breaststroke	35.25	h	Pilar Shimizu	Guam	15 December 2010	World Championships	Dubai, United Arab Emirates	
100m breaststroke	1:18.36	h	Pilar Shimizu	Guam	17 December 2010	World Championships	Dubai, United Arab Emirates	
200m breaststroke	2:51.66	h	Pilar Shimizu	Guam	19 December 2010	World Championships	Dubai, United Arab Emirates	
50m butterfly	31.44	h	Mineri Gomez	Guam	24 September 2017	Asian Indoor and Martial Arts Games	Ashgabat, Turkmenistan	
100m butterfly	1:13.32	h	Mineri Gomez	Guam	23 September 2017	Asian Indoor and Martial Arts Games	Ashgabat, Turkmenistan	
200 m butterfly								
100m individual medley	1:20.52	h	Danielle Atoigue	Guam	13 December 2012	World Championships	Istanbul, Turkey	
200 m individual medley								
400 m individual medley								
4×50 m freestyle relay								
4×100 m freestyle relay								
4×200 m freestyle relay								
4×50 m medley relay								
4×100 m medley relay								

Legend: # – Record awaiting ratification by Guam Swimming Federation; WR – World record; OC – Oceanian record;
Records not set in finals: h – heat; sf – semifinal; r – relay 1st leg; rh – relay heat 1st leg; b – B final; † – en route to final mark; so – swim-off; tt – time trial

=== Mixed relay ===
Event	Time		Name	Club	Date	Meet	Location	Ref
4×50 m freestyle relay	1:49.08	h	Benjamin Schulte (23.62); Amanda Joy Poppe (31.01); Mineri Kurotori Gomez (29.53); James Hendrix (24.92)	Guam	12 December 2018	World Championships	Hangzhou, China	
4×50 m medley relay	2:00.76	h	Amanda Joy Poppe (35.68); Benjamin Schulte (27.61); Mineri Kurotori Gomez (32.41); James Hendrix (25.06)	Guam	13 December 2018	World Championships	Hangzhou, China	

Legend: # – Record awaiting ratification by Guam Swimming Federation;
Records not set in finals: h – heat; so – swim-off
