= Guam at the 2012 Summer Olympics =

- IOC code: GUM
- NOC: Guam National Olympic Committee
- Website: www.oceaniasport.com/guam/

in London
- Competitors: 8 in 5 sports
- Flag bearers: Maria Dunn (opening); Ricardo Blas Jr. (closing)
- Medals: Gold 0 Silver 0 Bronze 0 Total 0

Summer Olympics appearances (overview)
- 1988; 1992; 1996; 2000; 2004; 2008; 2012; 2016; 2020; 2024; 2028

The United States' unincorporated territory of Guam competed at the 2012 Summer Olympics in London, held from July 27 to August 12, 2012. This was the territory's seventh consecutive appearance at the Olympics.

Guam National Olympic Committee sent 8 athletes to the Games, five men and three women, to compete in five sports. Half of them were Olympians who had competed in Beijing, including judoka Ricardo Blas Jr. and wrestler Maria Dunn, the latter who was honored as the territorial flag bearer at the Parade of Nations at the Opening Ceremonies of the London 2012 Summer Olympics. Olympian Mountain biker Derek Mandell competed after his 12-year absence. Swimmers Pilar Shimizu and Benjamin Schulte, have the distinction of being the youngest Olympians of the team, at age 16. Guam has yet to win an Olympic medal.

== Background ==
The National Olympic Committee for Guam was officially recognized on November 25, 1987, after a six year campaign. Guam's inaugural appearance was at the 1988 Winter Olympics, their inaugural Summer Olympics immediately followed in the next Games. They sent their largest delegation to the 1992 Summer Olympics, with 22 athletes. Guam has yet to win an Olympic medal.

== Athletics ==
Derek Mandell was given a universality placement to this Games and the 2008 Summer Olympics. Earlier in 2012, Mandell quit his job so he could train full-time in Australia. He trained under Mark Ladbrook, an Australian former national champion. Mandell competed in the 800 metres. He started the race well, finishing the first lap in 54 seconds, although he was well behind the pack. Halfway through the second lap, he was on pace to beat his personal record of 1:56.10, but his last 200 meters were slow. He finished with a time of 1:58.94, behind the winner's time in his heat of 1:45.90.

Amy Atkinson was given the other universality allotment, competing in the 800 metres. There were five competitors in Atkinson's heat. She kept near the lead pack, and moved into second place after the first lap. She fell behind and into last place, where she finished the race. Atkinson broke a Guamanian national record which stood for over 22 years, with a time of 2:18.53 in the 800 meter. Although she was last in her heat, she was excited about setting the national record.

Key

- Note–Ranks given for track events are within the athlete's heat only
- Q = Qualified for the next round
- q = Qualified for the next round as a fastest loser or, in field events, by position without achieving the qualifying target
- NR = National record
- N/A = Round not applicable for the event
- Bye = Athlete not required to compete in round

Athlete	Event	Heat		Semifinal		Final	
Athlete	Event	Result	Rank	Result	Rank	Result	Rank
Derek Mandell	800 m	1:58.94	7	did not advance			

Women

Athlete	Event	Heat		Semifinal		Final	
Athlete	Event	Result	Rank	Result	Rank	Result	Rank
Amy Atkinson	800 m	2:18.53 NR	5	did not advance			

== Cycling ==
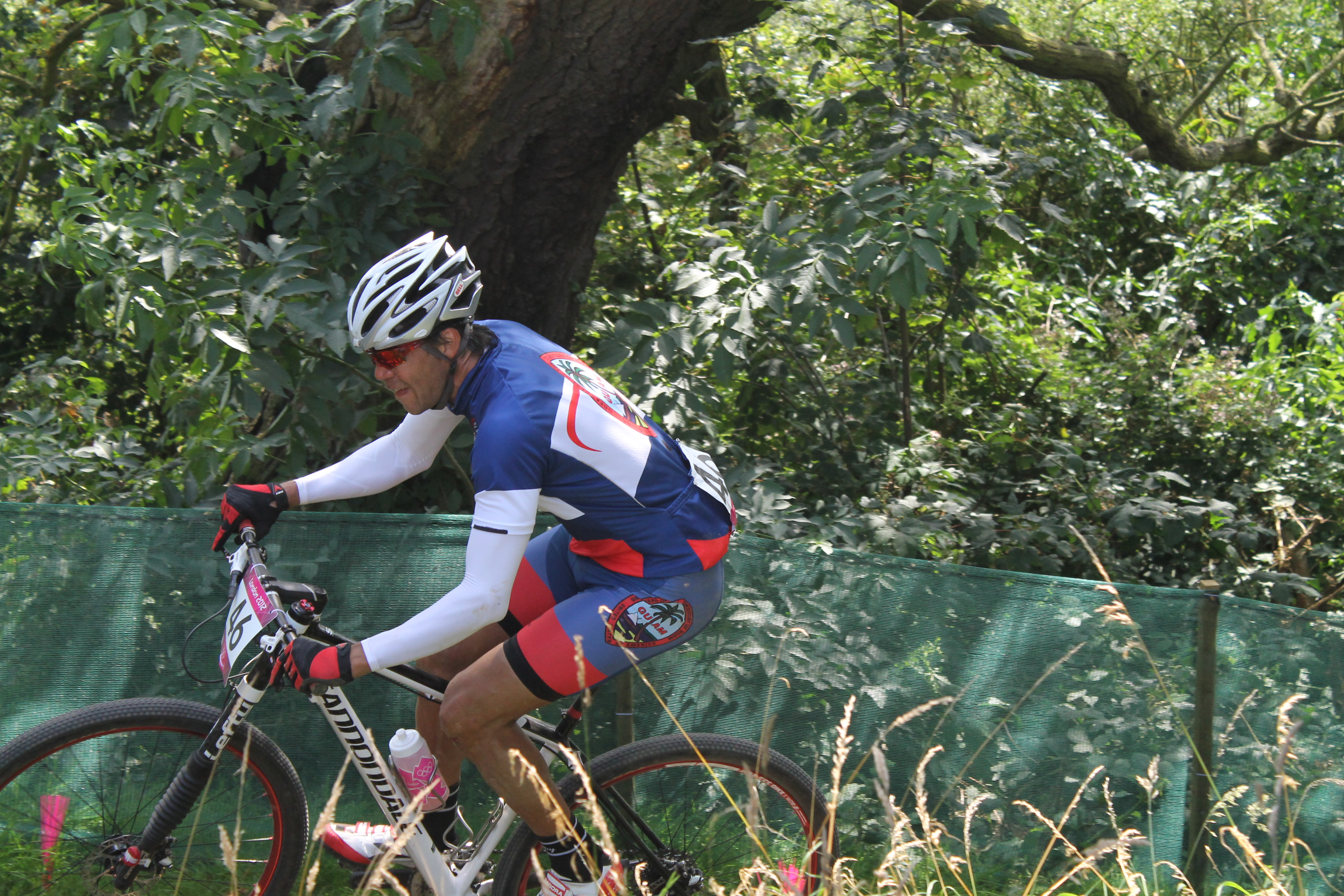
Derek Horton in men's cross country race

Olympian Derek Horton qualified for these games because of his performance at the Oceania Mountain Bike Championships. The 2000 Summer Olympics was his inaugural competition in the men's cross country bike. Horton was 39 years old at the time of competition.

Horton used a Canondale Flash 29er Carbon bicycle for the event. At the start of the race, riders were released in waves of eight, according to their world ranking. Horton, ranked 424 in the world, was in the sixth wave. Horton described the course as "crazy" and "intimidating". Horton was eliminated after completing two of the six laps. He fell too far behind the leader, and was eliminated per the event rules.

Mountain biking

Athlete	Event	Time	Rank
Derek Horton	Men's cross-country	LAP (1 lap)	42

== Judo ==
Ricardo Blas Jr. was the inaugural Guamanian to qualify for the 2012 Summer Olympics. Blas—nicknamed 'the little mountain from Guam'—competed in the +100 kg category, weighing in at 481 pounds (218 kg).

Blas defeated Facinet Keita from Guinea. He won by ippon after sweeping Keita's leg. Blas was the first Guamanian athlete in any sport to advance to the second round of competition through a victory. In the Round of 16, Blas lost to Óscar Brayson of Cuba.

Athlete	Event	Round of 32	Round of 16	Quarterfinals	Semifinals	Repechage	Final / BM	
Athlete	Event	Opposition Result	Opposition Result	Opposition Result	Opposition Result	Opposition Result	Opposition Result	Rank
Ricardo Blas Jr.	Men's +100 kg	Keita (GUI); W 0101–0002	Brayson (CUB); L 0001–0100	did not advance				

== Swimming ==
Benjamin Schulte competed in a qualifying event in 2011, but failed to qualify. He learned a month prior to the Olympics a New Zealand swimmer declined a spot reserved for Oceania, and was able to use that to qualify. He was the youngest Guamanian athlete for the 2012 Olympics. He trained by swimming nine kilometres (5.6 mi), ten times per week, going to the gym, and attending yoga classes. He finished last in the 10 km race, with a time of 2:03:35, 14 minutes behind the winner. Due to his determination to finish the race, he was nominated for the Swimming Man of the Year award.

Christopher Duenas qualified for the Games with a universality placement. Duenas swam the 100 meter freestyle and finished the race with a time of 53.37. After the race, Duenas said he was "disappointed", and that he thinks with additional training in Guam he can get his time back in the 51s. Duenas went from being ranked top three in the world for his age group to a poor showing at the Games. He planned to continue training for the Olympics to compete in Rio in 2016.

Pilar Shimizu qualified for the Games with a universality placement and competed in the 100 meter breaststroke. She entered the Games with the goal of replacing her own Guamanian national record. Shimizu finished the race with a time of 1:15.76, finishing 42nd overall and not advancing to the next round. She did not set the national record, but she did set a new personal best for the year.

Men

Athlete	Event	Heat		Semifinal		Final	
Athlete	Event	Time	Rank	Time	Rank	Time	Rank
Christopher Duenas	100 m freestyle	53.37	44	did not advance			
Benjamin Schulte	10 km open water	—N/a				2:03:35.1	25

Women

Athlete	Event	Heat		Semifinal		Final	
Athlete	Event	Time	Rank	Time	Rank	Time	Rank
Pilar Shimizu	100 m breaststroke	1:15.76	42	did not advance			

== Wrestling ==
Maria Dunn required a tripartite invitation to qualify for the Olympics. If the qualification were the same as the 2008 Olympics, Dunn would have qualified after she won the 2012 Oceanic Championships. Since the rules changed, she did not automatically qualify. Dunn trained in England, in the city of Wigan, with coach Roy Wood.

Dunn was the flagbearer for the Opening Ceremonies. She drew Lubov Volosova in her first match and lost to Volosova by pin. Dunn believed only one of her shoulders was down, and the official called the pin because it was near the end of the period. She hoped that Volosova would make it to the final match because that would advance Dunn into the loser's bracket. Volosova failed to do so, which eliminated Dunn from contention.

Key:

- VT - Victory by Fall.
- PP - Decision by Points - the loser with technical points.
- PO - Decision by Points - the loser without technical points.

;Women's freestyle

Athlete	Event	Qualification	Round of 16	Quarterfinal	Semifinal	Repechage 1	Repechage 2	Final / BM	
Athlete	Event	Opposition Result	Opposition Result	Opposition Result	Opposition Result	Opposition Result	Opposition Result	Opposition Result	Rank
Maria Dunn	−63 kg	Volosova (RUS); L 0–5 ^{VT}	did not advance						18
