= Guam at the 2000 Summer Olympics =

- IOC code: GUM
- NOC: Guam National Olympic Committee
- Website: www.oceaniasport.com/guam/

in Sydney
- Competitors: 7 in 5 sports
- Flag bearer: Melissa Lynn Fejeran
- Medals: Gold 0 Silver 0 Bronze 0 Total 0

Summer Olympics appearances (overview)
- 1988; 1992; 1996; 2000; 2004; 2008; 2012; 2016; 2020; 2024

Guam competed at the 2000 Summer Olympics in Sydney, Australia.

== Results by event ==
=== Athletics ===
Athlete	Race	Heat		Quarterfinal		Semifinal		Final	
Athlete	Race	Result	Place	Result	Place	Result	Place	Result	Place
Philiam Garcia	Men's 100m	11.21	9	Did not advance					
Rhonda Davidson-Alley	Women's Marathon	—N/a						3:13:58	44th

=== Cycling ===
==== Cross Country Mountain Bike ====
Athlete	Event	Time	Rank
Derek Horton	Men's cross-country	DNF	

==== Road Cycling ====
Athlete	Event	Time	Rank
Jazy Garcia	Men's Road Race	DNF	

=== Sailing ===
Guam competed in one event in the Sailing venue at the 2000 Sydney Olympics. They placed 41st.

Class	Athlete	Race											Result	Place
Class	Athlete	1	2	3	4	5	6	7	8	9	10	11	Result	Place
Laser	Brett Chivers	31	33	40	36	24	39	DNC	DNC	DNC	DNC	DNC	335	41

=== Swimming ===
Athlete	Event	Heat		Semifinal		Final
Athlete	Event	Result	Place	Result	Place	Final
Daniel O'Keeffe	Men's 100m Butterfly	56.05	45	did not advance		

=== Weightlifting ===
Athlete	Category	Weight	Jerk			Push			Total	Place
Athlete	Category	Weight	1	2	3	1	2	3	Total	Place
Melissa Lynn Fejeran	Women's 58 kg	57,80	50	55	57.5	70	75	~~77.5~~	132.5	15
