= Guam at the 2016 Summer Olympics =

- IOC code: GUM
- NOC: Guam National Olympic Committee
- Website: www.oceaniasport.com/guam/

in Rio de Janeiro
- Competitors: 5 in 3 sports
- Flag bearer: Benjamin Schulte
- Medals: Gold 0 Silver 0 Bronze 0 Total 0

Summer Olympics appearances (overview)
- 1988; 1992; 1996; 2000; 2004; 2008; 2012; 2016; 2020; 2024; 2028

Guam competed at the 2016 Summer Olympics in Rio de Janeiro, Brazil, from August 5 to 21, 2016. This was the territory's eighth consecutive appearance at the Summer Olympics.

Guam National Olympic Committee sent the territory's smallest delegation to the Games since 2004. Five athletes, three men and two women, were selected to the Guamanian team to compete only in athletics, mountain biking, and swimming. Three of them made their Olympic debut in Rio de Janeiro, with swimmers Pilar Shimizu and Benjamin Schulte, who led the squad as Guam's flag bearer in the opening ceremony, returning for their second appearance from London 2012.

None of the athletes made it past the first heat or won a medal. Guam has yet to win its first ever Olympic medal.

== Background ==
Guam was officially recognized on November 25, 1987, which they had worked towards for six years. Now officially recognized, Guam was able to send athletes to train in Australia and the United States, and had funding to improve its sports programs. Guam's first Olympic appearance was at the 1988 Winter Olympics where Judd Bankert became Guam's first Olympic athlete competing in the biathlon. Guam's first summer appearance was later that same year in Seoul, South Korea. Guam sent its largest delegation to the 1992 Summer Olympics, with 22 athletes.

Starting with the 1996 Olympic Games in Atlanta, Guam began sending fewer athletes. The NOC's sponsors were concerned about the cost of sending large delegations and wanted to send athletes who were more likely to be competitive. The IOC also asked countries to reduce the size of their delegations, since there were so many countries competing in those Olympics.

== Athletics ==
Guam received universality slots from IAAF to send two athletes (one male and one female) to the Olympics.

Joshua Ilustre competed in the 800 m race, finishing with a time of 1:58.85. He found out an hour after the race that he was disqualified due to a lane violation. Ilustre appealed the ruling, but after twelve hours learned it was unsuccessful. He thought the video evidence was unclear on whether he stepped on the line. The time would have been a personal best for Ilustre. He said, "I wish things would have turned out better. It is what it is. I can't do much about it, but make it into a learning experience".

Regine Tugade ran the 100 m sprint. She finished third in her heat with a time of 12.52 seconds, just short of her national record time of 12.26 seconds. She placed third in her heat, failing to advance to the next round. She wore a red hair tie, a tradition she has kept since high school, which along with her red spikes match the color of Guam's flag. About her performance, she said "I didn't run my personal best, but I honestly felt like I ran my hardest and I felt like I performed well. It may not show time-wise, but my body and my mentality feels like I pushed it to my limit".

Key

- Note–Ranks given for track events are within the athlete's heat only
- N/A = Round not applicable for the event

Track & road events

Athlete	Event	Heat		Quarterfinal		Semifinal		Final	
Athlete	Event	Time	Rank	Time	Rank	Time	Rank	Time	Rank
Joshua Ilustre	Men's 800 m	DSQ		—N/a		did not advance			
Regine Tugade	Women's 100 m	12.52	3	did not advance					

== Cycling ==
=== Mountain biking ===
Guam qualified one mountain biker for the men's Olympic cross-country race, as Oceania's sole representative outside the world's top twenty-five nations in the UCI Olympic Ranking List of May 25, 2016. Peter Lombard was the only Guamanian athlete to qualify for the 2016 Olympics on merit. Lombard is an eye surgeon, and rearranged his work schedule to allow for more training. He also took a week off of work to train on mountains in Japan.

Lombard was one of five athletes who did not finish the race. He had issues with his bike pedal that made it hard to clip in. At one point, the course was so slippery from rain riders had to dismount. The faulty clip made it difficult for Lombard to re-mount his bike. He crashed on both the first and second lap before being pulled from the race after the second crash. Once the motorcycle pulled him from the race, he was at the top of a mountain and unsure where to go. He decided to cheer on the cyclists still in the race, which drew attention and was well received by the crowd. About his Olympic experience, he said, "I'm happy to be done, happy to be in one piece".

Athlete	Event	Time	Rank
Peter Lombard	Men's cross-country	did not finish	

== Swimming ==
Guam received a universality invitation from FINA to send two swimmers (one male and one female) to the Olympics.

Pilar Shimizu competed in the 100 m breaststroke. She held the Guamanian national record for the event at the time of competition. Shimizu previously placed 42nd in the event during the 2012 London Olympics. She finished her event with a time of 1:16.65, which was not sufficient to advance.

Benjamin Schulte, the flagbearer for the opening and closing ceremonies, swam in the 100 m breaststroke. He broke his own national record with a time of 1:03.29 (previous record was 1:03.42). He was happy with his result and plans on competing in the 2020 Olympics in Tokyo.

Athlete	Event	Heat		Semifinal		Final	
Athlete	Event	Time	Rank	Time	Rank	Time	Rank
Benjamin Schulte	Men's 100 m breaststroke	1:03.29	43	did not advance			
Pilar Shimizu	Women's 100 m breaststroke	1:16.65	38	did not advance			

Qualifiers for the latter rounds of all swimming events were decided on a time only basis, therefore positions shown are overall results versus competitors in all heats.
