= Guam at the 1988 Winter Olympics =

- IOC code: GUM
- NOC: Guam National Olympic Committee
- Website: www.oceaniasport.com/guam/

in Calgary
- Competitors: 1 in 1 sport
- Flag bearer: Judd Bankert
- Medals: Gold 0 Silver 0 Bronze 0 Total 0

Winter Olympics appearances (overview)
- 1988; 1992–2026

Guam sent a four-member delegation to the 1988 Winter Olympics in Calgary, Alberta, Canada from 13 to 28 February 1988. This is, as of 2026, Guam's only appearance in the Winter Olympic Games. The Guam delegation included only one athlete biathlete, Judd Bankert, who became Guam's first Olympic athlete. In his only event, the sprint, Bankert finished in 71st out of 72 competitors.

== Background ==
The Guam National Olympic Committee was recognized by the International Olympic Committee on 1 January 1986. The 1988 Winter Olympics were therefore their debut in Olympic competition; and Judd Bankert the territory's first Olympic athlete. Guam has gone on to participate in every Summer Olympic Games since the 1988 Seoul Olympics, but has yet to make a return trip to the Winter Olympic Games. The 1988 Winter Olympics were held in Calgary, Alberta, Canada from 13 to 28 February 1988; a total of 1,423 athletes representing 57 National Olympic Committees took part. The Guamian four member delegation included only a single biathlete, Judd Bankert, who was selected as the flag-bearer for the opening ceremony.

== Competitors ==
The following is the list of number of competitors in the Games.

Sport	Men	Women	Total
Biathlon	1	–	1
Total	1	0	1

== Biathlon ==
Judd Bankert was 38 years old at the time of the Calgary Olympics. He was born in Grand Rapids, Michigan and had moved to Guam in 1981. He had suffered a hip fracture in a fall six year earlier and was able to train on skis only four months before the Games. Bankert was the first ever Olympian to represent Guam. On 23 February, he took part in the sprint race, a 10 kilometer race with two shooting rounds. Each missed shot required an athlete to ski a 150-meter penalty loop. Bankert missed four out of five targets in each of the shooting rounds, meaning he had to ski a total of eight penalty loops; he finished the race in 45 minutes and 37.1 seconds. This put him in 71st place out of 72 competitors who finished the race. Frank-Peter Roetsch of East Germany won the gold medal in a time of 25 minutes and 8.1 seconds; the silver and bronze medals were both won by biathletes from the Soviet Union, Valeriy Medvedtsev and Sergei Tchepikov respectively.

Athlete	Event	Final		
Athlete	Event	Time	Pen.	Rank
Judd Bankert	Sprint	45:37.1	8	71

== See also ==
- Guam at the 1988 Summer Olympics
