= Guam at the Olympics =

- IOC code: GUM
- NOC: Guam National Olympic Committee
- Website: www.oceaniasport.com/guam/
- Medals: Gold 0 Silver 0 Bronze 0 Total 0

Summer appearances
- 1988; 1992; 1996; 2000; 2004; 2008; 2012; 2016; 2020; 2024

Winter appearances
- 1988; 1992–2026

Guam has competed in 10 Summer Olympic Games. Guam participated only once, as for 2026, at the Winter Olympic Games in 1988 when Judd Bankert became Guam's first Olympic athlete competing in the biathlon. Only two athletes from Guam, canoeist Sean Pangelinan and judoka Ricardo Blas Jr, have made it past the first round of competition. During the 2008 Games in Beijing, Pangelinan advanced to the C-1 500m semi-finals and Blas Jr progressed to the Round of 16 100 kg+ Judo competition at London 2012.

== Medal tables ==
=== Medals by Summer Games ===
Games	Athletes	Gold	Silver	Bronze	Total	Rank
1988 Seoul	20	0	0	0	0	–
1992 Barcelona	22	0	0	0	0	–
1996 Atlanta	8	0	0	0	0	–
2000 Sydney	7	0	0	0	0	–
2004 Athens	4	0	0	0	0	–
2008 Beijing	6	0	0	0	0	–
2012 London	8	0	0	0	0	–
2016 Rio de Janeiro	5	0	0	0	0	–
2020 Tokyo	5	0	0	0	0	–
2024 Paris	8	0	0	0	0	–
2028 Los Angeles	future event					
2032 Brisbane	future event					
Total		0	0	0	0	–

=== Medals by Winter Games ===
Games	Athletes	Gold	Silver	Bronze	Total	Rank
1988 Calgary	1	0	0	0	0	–
1992–2026	did not participate					
2030 French Alps	future event					
2034 Utah	future event					
Total		0	0	0	0	–

== Olympic participants ==
=== Summer Olympics ===
Sport	1988	1992	1996	2000	2004	2008	2012	2016	2020	2024	Athletes
Archery		1									1
Athletics	6	2	2	2	2	2	2	2	1	2	23
Boxing	1										1
Canoeing						1				1	2
Cycling		6		2			1	1			10
Judo	3	2				1	1		1	1	9
Sailing	2	2	3	1							8
Swimming	5	7	2	1	1	1	3	2	2		24
Triathlon										1	1
Weightlifting	2	1		1						1	5
Wrestling	1	1	1		1	1	1		1	2	9
Total	20	22	8	7	4	6	8	5	5	8	93

=== Winter Olympics ===
Sport	1988	Athletes
Biathlon	1	1

== See also ==
- List of flag bearers for Guam at the Olympics
- Tropical nations at the Winter Olympics
