= Guam at the 1988 Summer Olympics =

- IOC code: GUM
- NOC: Guam National Olympic Committee

in Seoul
- Competitors: 19 in 7 sports
- Flag bearer: Ricardo Blas
- Medals: Gold 0 Silver 0 Bronze 0 Total 0

Summer Olympics appearances (overview)
- 1988; 1992; 1996; 2000; 2004; 2008; 2012; 2016; 2020; 2024; 2028

Guam competed in the Summer Olympic Games for the first time at the 1988 Summer Olympics in Seoul, South Korea. The Guam National Olympic Committee was formed in 1976 and recognized by the International Olympic Committee (IOC) in 1986.

== Competitors ==
The following is the list of number of competitors in the Games.

Sport	Men	Women	Total
Athletics	3	3	6
Boxing	1	–	1
Judo	3	–	3
Sailing	2	0	2
Swimming	2	2	4
Weightlifting	2	–	2
Wrestling	1	–	1
Total	14	5	19

== Results by event ==
=== Athletics ===
Men's Marathon

- Fred Schumann — 2"49.52 (→ 86th place)
- James Walker — 2"56.32 (→ 90th place)
- Ricardo Taitano — 3"03.19 (→ 94th place)

Women's Marathon

- Julie Ogborn — 3"10.31 (→ 59th place)
- Lourdes Klitzkie — 3"25.32 (→ 63rd place)
- Mariana Ysrael — 3"42.23 (→ 64th place)

=== Swimming ===
Men's 100m Freestyle

- Jonathan Sakovich
  1. Heat – 54.24 (→ did not advance, 53rd place)

Men's 200m Freestyle

- Jonathan Sakovich
  1. Heat – 1:57.72 (→ did not advance, 49th place)

Men's 400m Freestyle

- Jonathan Sakovich
  1. Heat – 4:06.89 (→ did not advance, 41st place)

Men's 1500m Freestyle

- Jonathan Sakovich
  1. Heat – 16:26.77 (→ did not advance, 35th place)

Men's 100m Backstroke

- Patrick Sagisi
  1. Heat – 1:01.86 (→ did not advance, 41st place)

Men's 200m Backstroke

- Patrick Sagisi
  1. Heat – 2:15.82 (→ did not advance, 36th place)

Men's 200m Individual Medley

- Jonathan Sakovich
  1. Heat – 2:16.70 (→ did not advance, 45th place)

Men's 400m Individual Medley

- Jonathan Sakovich
  1. Heat – 4:44.78 (→ did not advance, 29th place out of 34)

Women's 50m Freestyle

- Veronica Cummings
  1. Heat – 28.94 (→ did not advance, 43rd place)

Women's 100m Freestyle

- Veronica Cummings
  1. Heat – 1:02.63 (→ did not advance, 50th place)

Women's 100m Butterfly

- Barbara Gayle
  1. Heat – 1:12.84 (→ did not advance, 40th place)

=== Wrestling ===
- Reuben Tucker, 90 kg
