= Guam at the 2020 Summer Olympics =

- IOC code: GUM
- NOC: Guam National Olympic Committee
- Website: www.oceaniasport.com/guam/

in Tokyo, Japan July 23, 2021 – August 8, 2021
- Competitors: 5 in 4 sports
- Flag bearers (opening): Regine Tugade; Joshter Andrew
- Flag bearer (closing): Rckaela Aquino
- Medals: Gold 0 Silver 0 Bronze 0 Total 0

Summer Olympics appearances (overview)
- 1988; 1992; 1996; 2000; 2004; 2008; 2012; 2016; 2020; 2024; 2028

Guam competed at the 2020 Summer Olympics in Tokyo. Originally scheduled to take place from 24 July to 9 August 2020, the Games were postponed to 23 July to 8 August 2021, because of the COVID-19 pandemic. It was the nation's ninth consecutive appearance at the Summer Olympics.

== Competitors ==
The following is the list of number of competitors in the Games.

Sport	Men	Women	Total
Athletics	0	1	1
Judo	1	0	1
Swimming	1	1	2
Wrestling	0	1	1
Total	2	3	5

== Athletics ==
Guam received universality slots from IAAF to send a female track and field athlete to the Olympics.

Key

- Note–Ranks given for track events are within the athlete's heat only
- Q = Qualified for the next round
- q = Qualified for the next round as a fastest loser or, in field events, by position without achieving the qualifying target
- NR = National record
- N/A = Round not applicable for the event
- Bye = Athlete not required to compete in round

Track & road events

Athlete	Event	Preliminaries		Heat		Semifinal		Final	
Athlete	Event	Result	Rank	Result	Rank	Result	Rank	Result	Rank
Regine Tugade	Women's 100 m	12.17	4	Did not advance					

== Judo ==
Guam entered one male judoka into the Olympic tournament based on the International Judo Federation Olympics Individual Ranking.

Athlete	Event	Round of 64	Round of 32	Round of 16	Quarterfinals	Semifinals	Repechage	Final / BM	
Athlete	Event	Opposition Result	Opposition Result	Opposition Result	Opposition Result	Opposition Result	Opposition Result	Opposition Result	Rank
Joshter Andrew	Men's −81 kg	Murodov (TJK); L 00–11	Did not advance						

== Swimming ==
Guam qualified two swimmers in two events.

Athlete	Event	Heat		Semifinal		Final	
Athlete	Event	Time	Rank	Time	Rank	Time	Rank
Jagger Stephens	Men's 100 m freestyle	52.72	57	Did not advance			
Mineri Gomez	Women's 100 m freestyle	1:04.00	51	Did not advance			

== Wrestling ==
For the first time since London 2012, Guam qualified one wrestler for the women's freestyle 53 kg into the Olympic competition, by progressing to the top two finals at the 2021 African & Oceania Qualification Tournament in Hammamet, Tunisia.

Key:

- VT (ranking points: 5–0 or 0–5) – Victory by fall.
- VB (ranking points: 5–0 or 0–5) – Victory by injury (VF for forfeit, VA for withdrawal or disqualification)
- PP (ranking points: 3–1 or 1–3) – Decision by points – the loser with technical points.
- PO (ranking points: 3–0 or 0–3) – Decision by points – the loser without technical points.
- ST (ranking points: 4–0 or 0–4) – Great superiority – the loser without technical points and a margin of victory of at least 8 (Greco-Roman) or 10 (freestyle) points.
- SP (ranking points: 4–1 or 1–4) – Technical superiority – the loser with technical points and a margin of victory of at least 8 (Greco-Roman) or 10 (freestyle) points.

Freestyle

Athlete	Event	Round of 16	Quarterfinal	Semifinal	Repechage	Final / BM	
Athlete	Event	Opposition Result	Opposition Result	Opposition Result	Opposition Result	Opposition Result	Rank
Rckaela Aquino	Women's −53 kg	Bat-Ochir (MGL); L 0–5 ^{VT}	Did not advance				14
