= Athletics at the 1988 Summer Olympics – Women's marathon =

Women's marathon at the Games of the XXIV Olympiad
- Venue: Jamsil Olympic Stadium, Seoul
- Dates: September 23
- Competitors: 70 from 39 nations
- Winning time: 2:25:40

Medalists
1st place, gold medalist(s)		Rosa Mota; Portugal
2nd place, silver medalist(s)		Lisa Martin; Australia
3rd place, bronze medalist(s)		Katrin Dörre; East Germany

The Women's Marathon at the 1988 Summer Olympics in Seoul, South Korea was held on Friday September 23, 1988. The race started at 09.30h local time and was won by 13 seconds by Rosa Mota of Portugal. There were 70 competitors from 39 countries, with 64 finishers.

== Medalists ==
Gold	Rosa Mota; Portugal
Silver	Lisa Martin; Australia
Bronze	Katrin Dörre; East Germany

== Abbreviations ==
- All times shown are in hours:minutes:seconds

DNS	did not start
NM	no mark
OR	olympic record
WR	world record
AR	area record
NR	national record
PB	personal best
SB	season best

== Records ==
Standing records prior to the 1988 Summer Olympics
World Record	Ingrid Kristiansen (NOR)	2:21:06	April 21, 1985	London, United Kingdom
Olympic Record	Joan Benoit (USA)	2:24:52	August 5, 1984	Los Angeles, United States
Season Best	Lisa Ondieki (AUS)	2:23:51	January 31, 1988	Osaka, Japan

== Final rankings ==
Place	Athlete	Country	Time
1st place, gold medalist(s)	Rosa Mota	Portugal	2:25:40
2nd place, silver medalist(s)	Lisa Martin	Australia	2:25:53
3rd place, bronze medalist(s)	Katrin Dörre	East Germany	2:26:21
4	Tatyana Polovinskaya	Soviet Union	2:27:05
5	Zhao Youfeng	China	2:27:06
6	Laura Fogli	Italy	2:27:49
7	Danièle Kaber	Luxembourg	2:29:23
8	Maria Curatolo	Italy	2:30:14
9	Zoya Ivanova	Soviet Union	2:30:25
10	Angie Pain	Great Britain	2:30:51
11	Odette Lapierre	Canada	2:30:56
12	Susan Tooby	Great Britain	2:31:33
13	Karolina Szabo	Hungary	2:32:26
14	Françoise Bonnet	France	2:32:36
15	Lee Mi-Ok	South Korea	2:32:51
16	Raisa Smekhnova	Soviet Union	2:33:19
17	Nancy Ditz	United States	2:33:42
18	Maria Rebelo-Lelut	France	2:33:47
19	Jocelyne Villeton	France	2:34:02
20	Conceição Ferreira	Portugal	2:34:23
21	Kerstin Preßler	West Germany	2:34:26
22	Wanda Panfil	Poland	2:34:35
23	Antonella Bizioli	Italy	2:34:38
24	Evy Palm	Sweden	2:34:41
25	Eriko Asai	Japan	2:34:41
26	Lizanne Bussieres	Canada	2:35:03
27	Gabriela Wolf	West Germany	2:35:11
28	Kumi Araki	Japan	2:35:15
29	Misako Miyahara	Japan	2:35:26
30	Zhong Huandi	China	2:36:02
31	Ellen Rochefort	Canada	2:36:44
32	Susan Crehan	Great Britain	2:36:57
33	Lorraine Moller	New Zealand	2:37:52
34	Carla Beurskens	Netherlands	2:37:52
35	Magda Ilands	Belgium	2:38:02
36	Sissel Grottenberg	Norway	2:38:17
37	Im Eun-ju	South Korea	2:38:21
38	Marcianne Mukamurenzi	Rwanda	2:40:12
39	Margaret Groos	United States	2:40:59
40	Cathy O'Brien	United States	2:41:04
41	Tuija Jousimaa	Finland	2:43:00
42	Sinikka Keskitalo	Finland	2:43:00
43	Blanca Jaime	Mexico	2:43:00
44	Angélica de Almeida	Brazil	2:43:40
45	Ludmila Melicherová	Czechoslovakia	2:43:56
46	Ailish Smyth	Ireland	2:44:17
47	Genoveva Eichenmann	Switzerland	2:44:37
48	Rosmarie Müller	Switzerland	2:47:31
49	Pascaline Wangui	Kenya	2:47:42
50	Apollinarie Nyinawabéra	Rwanda	2:49:18
51	Maryse Justin	Mauritius	2:50:00
52	Michelle Bush	Cayman Islands	2:51:30
53	María del Pilar	Guatemala	2:51:33
54	Li Juan	China	2:53:08
55	Linda Hunter	Zimbabwe	2:53:17
56	Cornelia Melis	Aruba	2:53:24
57	Marie Murphy-Rollins	Ireland	2:54:37
58	Kriscia García	El Salvador	3:04:21
59	Julie Ogborn	Guam	3:06:05
60	Raj Kumari Pandey	Nepal	3:10:31
61	Menuka Rawat	Nepal	3:11:17
62	Arlene Vincent Mark	Grenada	3:23:56
63	Lourdes Klitzkie	Guam	3:25:32
64	Mariana Ysrael	Guam	3:42:23
–	Grete Waitz	Norway	DNF
–	Agnes Pardaens	Belgium	DNF
–	Kim Mi-gyeong	South Korea	DNF
–	Aurora Cunha	Portugal	DNF
–	Bente Moe	Norway	DNF
–	Mar Mar Min	Burma	DNF
–	Birgit Stephan	East Germany	DNS
–	Katerina Pratsi	Cyprus	DNS

== See also ==
- 1986 Women's European Championships Marathon (Stuttgart)
- 1987 Women's World Championships Marathon (Rome)
- 1988 Marathon Year Ranking
- 1990 Women's European Championships Marathon (Split)
- 1991 Women's World Championships Marathon (Tokyo)
