= Lourdes Klitzkie =

Guamanian long-distance runner (born 1940)

Personal information
- Full name: Lourdes Palomo Klitzkie
- Nationality: Guamanian
- Born: Lourdes Palomo; 2 February 1940 (age 86)

Sport
- Sport: Long-distance running
- Event: Marathon

Lourdes Palomo Klitzkie (born 2 February 1940) is a Guamanian long-distance runner and professor of education. Klitzkie began long-distance running in her late thirties to combat boredom, later qualifying to represent Guam at the 1988 Summer Olympics upon recording a time below the Guamanian qualifying standard of 3:30 in the marathon.

Klitzkie was the oldest Guamanian athlete at the 1988 Olympics, and the oldest competitor in the women's marathon at the games. She placed 63rd out of the 64 athletes who completed the race.

== Biography ==
Lourdes Palomo (Note: The sports database Olympedia states that Klitzkie's full name is Lourdes Mendiola Klitzkie.) was born on 2 February 1940. Palomo earned her bachelor's degree for elementary education in 1970 at the University of Guam. At some point, she married future Guamanian senator Robert Klitzkie, adopting the name Lourdes Palomo Klitzkie. She later earned her master's degree in 1974 at the University of New Mexico. Five years later, she earned a Doctor of Philosophy degree in special education at Utah State University.

Around the time of her graduation from Utah State University, Klitzkie, at the age of 39, took up long-distance running to combat boredom. At the time, she lived in Albuquerque, and her husband was studying for the bar exam in California. She ran fourteen marathons, including the Honolulu Marathon and the Seiko Guam Marathon, before the 1988 Summer Olympics. She qualified for the Guamanian team for the 1988 Olympics in Seoul, South Korea, after recording a time below the Guamanian qualifying standard of 3:30 in the marathon. In June 1988, upon learning that she had qualified, she stated: "I couldn't believe it. I said, 'Boy I'm at the right place at the right time.'"

Guam competed for the first time in the Summer Olympics in 1988. There, Klitzkie was the oldest woman on the Guamanian delegation and the oldest competitor in the women's marathon at the age of 48. She competed in the marathon on 23 September alongside 68 competitors who started in the event. There, she finished with a time of 3:25:32 for a new personal best, and placed 63rd out of the 64 competitors who finished the race, placing ahead of her compatriot Mariana Ysrael. Klitzkie received a standing ovation upon entering the Seoul Olympic Stadium, stating afterwards: "I felt like I was a winner."

Two years after the 1988 Olympics, Klitzkie lived in Yigo. She later became a professor at the University of Guam.
