= Guam at the 2008 Summer Olympics =

- IOC code: GUM
- NOC: Guam National Olympic Committee
- Website: www.oceaniasport.com/guam/

in Beijing
- Competitors: 6 in 5 sports
- Flag bearers: Ricardo Blas Jr. (opening); Maria Dunn (closing)
- Medals: Gold 0 Silver 0 Bronze 0 Total 0

Summer Olympics appearances (overview)
- 1988; 1992; 1996; 2000; 2004; 2008; 2012; 2016; 2020; 2024; 2028

Guam was represented at the 2008 Summer Olympics in Beijing, China by the Guam National Olympic Committee.

In total, six athletes including four men and two women represented Guam in five different sports including athletics, canoeing, judo, swimming and wrestling.

== Competitors ==
In total, six athletes represented Guam at the 2008 Summer Olympics in Beijing, China across five different sports.

Sport	Men	Women	Total
Athletics	1	1	2
Canoeing	1	0	1
Judo	1	0	1
Swimming	1	0	1
Wrestling	0	1	1
Total	4	2	6

== Athletics ==
In total, two Guamanian athletes participated in the athletics events – Derek Mandell in the men's 800 m and Cora Alicto in the women's 100 m.

Mandell trained for the Olympics by running for about 40 minutes in the morning, lifting weights, and running in the ocean for extra resistance.

The heats for the men's 800 m took place on 20 August 2008. Mandell finished eighth in his heat in a time of one minute 57.48 seconds and he did not advance to the semi-finals.

Athlete	Event	Heat		Semifinal		Final	
Athlete	Event	Result	Rank	Result	Rank	Result	Rank
Derek Mandell	800 m	1:57.48 PB	8	Did not advance			

The heats for the women's 100 m took place on 16 August 2008. Alicto finished seventh in her heat in a time of 13.31 seconds and she did not advance to the quarter-finals.

Athlete	Event	Heat		Quarterfinal		Semifinal		Final	
Athlete	Event	Result	Rank	Result	Rank	Result	Rank	Result	Rank
Cora Alicto	100 m	13.31	7	Did not advance					

== Canoeing ==
In total, one Guamanian athlete participated in the canoeing events – Sean Pangelinan in the men's C-1 500 m and the men's C-1 1,000 m.

The heats for the men's C-1 500 m took place on 19 August 2008. Pangelinan finished seventh in his heat in a time of two minutes 12.696 seconds and he advanced to the semi-finals. The semi-finals took place on 21 August 2008. Pangelinan finished ninth in his semi-final in a time of two minutes 17.94 seconds and he did not advance to the final.

The heats for the men's C-1 1,000 m took place on 18 August 2008. Pangelinan finished eighth in his heat in a time of four minutes 49.284 seconds and he did not advance to the semi-final.

Athlete	Event	Heats		Semifinals		Final	
Athlete	Event	Time	Rank	Time	Rank	Time	Rank
Sean Pangelinan	Men's C-1 500 m	2:12.696	7 QS	2:17.940	9	Did not advance	
Sean Pangelinan	Men's C-1 1,000 m	4:49.284	8	Did not advance			

Qualification Legend: QS = Qualify to semi-final; QF = Qualify directly to final

== Judo ==
In total, one Guamanian athlete participated in the judo events – Ricardo Blas Jr. in the men's +100 kg category.

Athlete	Event	Preliminary	Round of 32	Round of 16	Quarterfinals	Semifinals	Repechage 1	Repechage 2	Repechage 3	Final / BM	
Athlete	Event	Opposition Result	Opposition Result	Opposition Result	Opposition Result	Opposition Result	Opposition Result	Opposition Result	Opposition Result	Opposition Result	Rank
Ricardo Blas Jr.	Men's +100 kg	Bye	Gujejiani (GEO); L 0001–0200	Did not advance			McCormick (USA); L 0010–0100	Did not advance			

== Swimming ==
In total, one Guamanian athlete participated in the swimming events – Christopher Duenas in the men's 100 m freestyle.

The heats for the men's 100 m freestyle took place on 12 August 2008. Duenas finished seventh in his heat in a time of 52.64 seconds which was ultimately not fast enough to advance to the semi-finals.

Athlete	Event	Heat		Semifinal		Final	
Athlete	Event	Time	Rank	Time	Rank	Time	Rank
Christopher Duenas	100 m freestyle	52.64	59	Did not advance			

== Wrestling ==
In total, one Guamanian athlete participated in the wrestling events – Maria Dunn in the women's freestyle −63 kg category.

The women's freestyle −63 kg category took place on 17 August 2008. Dunn received a bye in the first round. In the second round, she lost to Elina Vaseva of Bulgaria.

Athlete	Event	Qualification	Round of 16	Quarterfinal	Semifinal	Repechage 1	Repechage 2	Final / BM	
Athlete	Event	Opposition Result	Opposition Result	Opposition Result	Opposition Result	Opposition Result	Opposition Result	Opposition Result	Rank
Maria Dunn	−63 kg	Bye	Vaseva (BUL); L 0–3 ^{PO}	Did not advance					17
