= Guam at the 2024 Summer Olympics =

- IOC code: GUM
- NOC: Guam National Olympic Committee

in Paris, France 26 July 2024 – 11 August 2024
- Competitors: 8 (1 man and 7 women) in 6 sports
- Flag bearers (opening): Joseph Green & Rckaela Aquino
- Flag bearer (closing): Mia-Lahnee Aquino
- Officials: James Borja (Chef de Mission)
- Medals: Gold 0 Silver 0 Bronze 0 Total 0

Summer Olympics appearances (overview)
- 1988; 1992; 1996; 2000; 2004; 2008; 2012; 2016; 2020; 2024

Guam competed at the 2024 Summer Olympics in Paris from 26 July to 11 August 2024.

== Competitors ==
The following is the list of number of competitors in the Games.

Sport	Men	Women	Total
Athletics	1	1	2
Canoeing	0	1	1
Judo	0	1	1
Triathlon	0	1	1
Weightlifting	0	1	1
Wrestling	0	2	2
Total	1	7	8

== Athletics ==
Guam sent two sprinters to compete at the 2024 Summer Olympics.

Key

- Note–Ranks given for track events are within the athlete's heat only
- Q = Qualified for the next round
- q = Qualified for the next round as a fastest loser or, in field events, by position without achieving the qualifying target
- NR = National record
- N/A = Round not applicable for the event
- Bye = Athlete not required to compete in round

Track events

Athlete	Event	Preliminary		Heat		Semifinal		Final	
Athlete	Event	Result	Rank	Result	Rank	Result	Rank	Result	Rank
Joseph Green	Men's 100 m	10.85 SB	5	Did Not Advance					
Regine Tugade	Women's 100 m	12.02	4 q	11.87	8	Did Not Advance			

== Canoeing ==
=== Sprint ===
For the first time since 2008, Guam female canoeists qualified one boat for the Games through the result of highest rank eligible nation's in the women's C-1 200 metres event at the 2024 Oceania Canoe Sprint Qualifier in Penrith, Australia.

Athlete	Event	Heats		Quarterfinals		Semifinals		Final	
Athlete	Event	Time	Rank	Time	Rank	Time	Rank	Time	Rank
Raina Taitingfong	Women's C-1 200 m	1:05.90	7	1:01.17	7	Did not advance			
Raina Taitingfong	Women's K-1 500 m	2:29.66	7	2:27.03	7	Did not advance			

Qualification Legend: FA = Qualify to final (medal); FB = Qualify to final B (non-medal)

== Judo ==
Guam qualified one judoka for the following weight class at the Games. Maria Escano (women's lightweight, 57 kg) got qualified via continental quota based on Olympic point rankings.

Athlete	Event	Round of 32	Round of 16	Quarterfinals	Semifinals	Repechage	Final / BM	
Athlete	Event	Opposition Result	Opposition Result	Opposition Result	Opposition Result	Opposition Result	Opposition Result	Rank
Maria Escano	Women's –57 kg	Esteves (GUI); L 00–10	Did not advance					

== Triathlon ==
Guam entered one female triathlete in the triathlon events for Paris, following the release of final individual olympics qualification ranking; marking the nations debut at the sports.

Athlete	Event	Time						Rank
Athlete	Event	Swim (1.5 km)	Trans 1	Bike (40 km)	Trans 2	Run (10 km)	Total	Rank
Manami Iijima	Women's individual	26:38	1:02	DNF				

== Weightlifting ==
For the first time since the year 2000, Guam entered one female weightlifter into the Olympic competition. Nicola Lagatao (women's 49 kg) secured one quotas to participate in her weight divisions based on the allocations of universality spots.

Athlete	Event	Snatch		Clean & Jerk		Total	Rank
Athlete	Event	Result	Rank	Result	Rank	Total	Rank
Nicola Lagatao	Women's −49 kg	59	11	77	11	136	11

== Wrestling ==
Guam qualified two wrestlers at the 2024 African & Oceania Olympic Qualification Tournament in Alexandria, Egypt.

Key:

- VT (ranking points: 5–0 or 0–5) – Victory by fall.
- VB (ranking points: 5–0 or 0–5) – Victory by injury (VF for forfeit, VA for withdrawal or disqualification)
- PP (ranking points: 3–1 or 1–3) – Decision by points – the loser with technical points.
- PO (ranking points: 3–0 or 0–3) – Decision by points – the loser without technical points.
- ST (ranking points: 4–0 or 0–4) – Great superiority – the loser without technical points and a margin of victory of at least 8 (Greco-Roman) or 10 (freestyle) points.
- SP (ranking points: 4–1 or 1–4) – Technical superiority – the loser with technical points and a margin of victory of at least 8 (Greco-Roman) or 10 (freestyle) points.

Freestyle

Athlete	Event	Round of 16	Quarterfinal	Semifinal	Repechage	Final / BM	
Athlete	Event	Opposition Result	Opposition Result	Opposition Result	Opposition Result	Opposition Result	Rank
Mia-Lahnee Aquino	Women's −53 kg	Qianyu (CHN) L 0–4 ^{ST}	Did not advance				
Rckaela Aquino	Women's −57 kg	Penalber (BRA) L 0–5^{VT}	Did not advance				
