= Guam at the 1996 Summer Olympics =

- IOC code: GUM
- NOC: Guam National Olympic Committee
- Website: www.oceaniasport.com/guam/

in Atlanta
- Competitors: 8
- Flag bearer: Patrick Sagisi
- Medals: Gold 0 Silver 0 Bronze 0 Total 0

Summer Olympics appearances (overview)
- 1988; 1992; 1996; 2000; 2004; 2008; 2012; 2016; 2020; 2024

Guam competed at the 1996 Summer Olympics in Atlanta, United States.

== Results by event ==
=== Athletics ===
Women's Marathon

- Marie Benito → 65th place (3:27.28)

=== Swimming ===
Men's 50m Freestyle

- Darrick Bollinger
  1. Heat – 23.97 (→ did not advance, 46th place)

Men's 100m Butterfly

- Patrick Sagisi
  1. Heat – 56.93 (→ did not advance, 51st place)
