= Christopher Duenas =

Guamanian swimmer

Personal information
- Born: 22 October 1991 (age 34) Tamuning, Guam

Sport
- Sport: Swimming
Medal record
Representing Guam
South Pacific Games
Bronze medal – third place	2007 Apia	100m freestyle
Bronze medal – third place	2007 Apia	4x100m freestyle relay
Bronze medal – third place	2007 Apia	4x200m freestyle relay

Christopher Duenas (born 22 October 1991) is an Olympic and national record holding swimmer from Guam. He has swum for Guam at the:

- Olympics: 2008, 2012
- World Championships: 2007, 2009, 2011
- Short Course Worlds: 2012

== Early life and education ==
Christopher Duenas started swimming when he was six years old.

== Olympic career ==
At the 2008 Olympics, he competed in the 100 m freestyle, finishing in 59th place.

At the 2012 Summer Olympics, he competed in the Men's 100 metre freestyle, finishing in 44th place overall in the heats, failing to qualify for the semifinals.

== International career ==
Duenas won a bronze medal at the 2007 Pacific Games in the 100 meter freestyle. He won a gold medal at the 2014 Micronesian Games in the 100 m butterfly. He also won a gold in the 200 medley relay. He set the national record in the 50 m freestyle at the 5th East Asian Games. He was part of the Guam team that set a new national record in the 4 x 100 m freestyle and 4 x 200 m freestyle at the 15th Pacific Games.
