= Lu Gang =

Chinese weightlifter

Personal information
- Nationality: Chinese
- Born: 19 June 1970 (age 54)

Sport
- Sport: Weightlifting

Lu Gang (born 19 June 1970) is a Chinese weightlifter. He competed in the men's middleweight event at the 1992 Summer Olympics.
