= Włodzimierz Chlebosz =

Polish weightlifter (born 1967)

Personal information
- Nationality: Polish
- Born: 14 January 1967 (age 58); Wrocław, Poland

Sport
- Sport: Weightlifting

Włodzimierz Chlebosz (born 14 January 1967) is a Polish weightlifter. He competed in the men's middleweight event at the 1992 Summer Olympics.
