= Linda Hunter =

Zimbabwean long-distance runner

Personal information
- Nationality: Zimbabwean
- Born: 10 December 1963 (age 62)

Sport
- Sport: Long-distance running
- Event: Marathon

Linda Elisabeth Hunter (born 10 December 1963) is a Zimbabwean former long-distance runner. She competed in the women's marathon at the 1988 Summer Olympics.
