= Marathon swimming at the 2012 Summer Olympics – Men's 10 kilometre =

Men's Marathon Swim at the Games of the XXX Olympiad
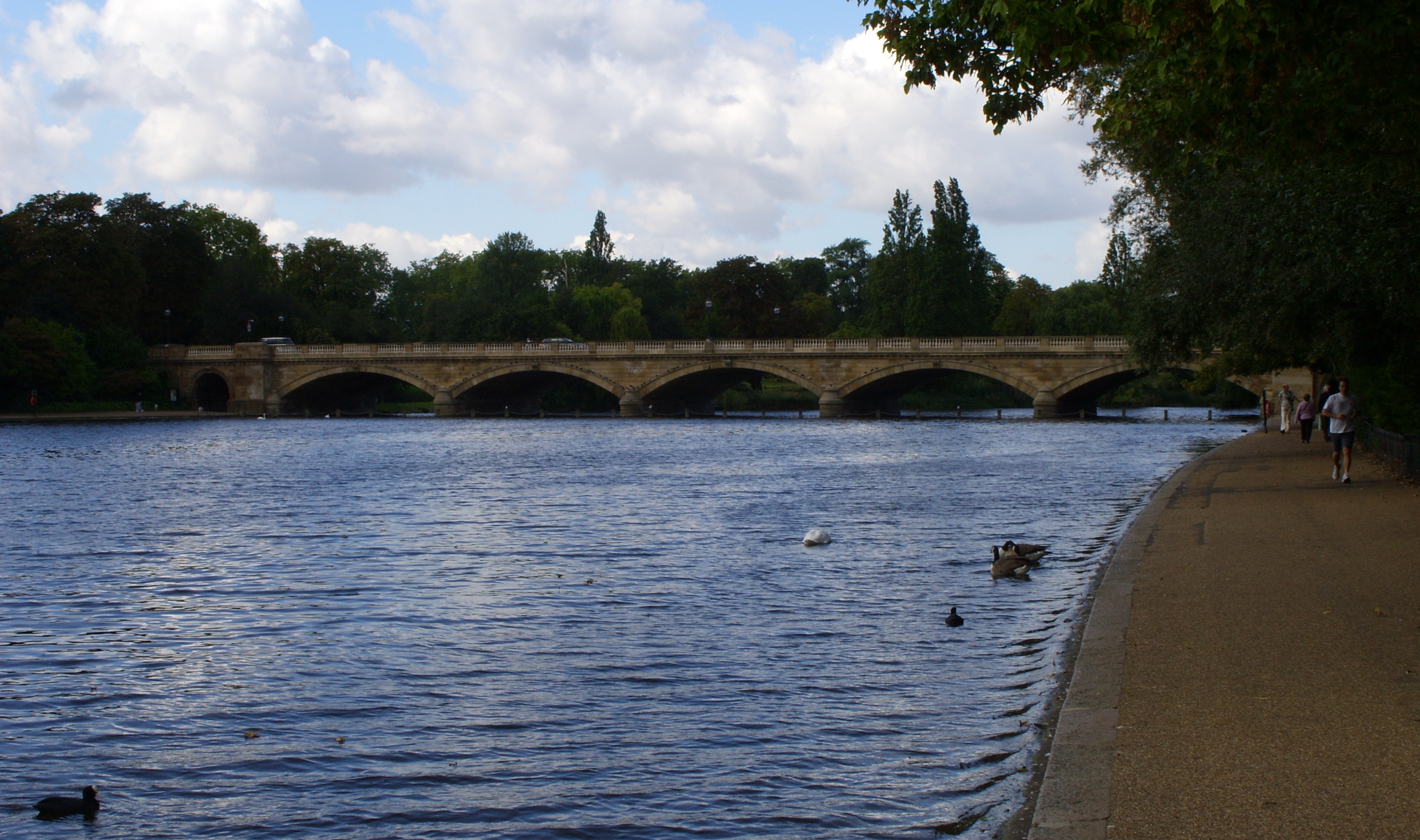
- The race was held in the Serpentine lake
- Venue: The Serpentine, Hyde Park
- Dates: August 10, 2012
- Competitors: 25 from 23 nations
- Winning time: 1:49:55.1

Medalists
| 1st place, gold medalist(s) | | Oussama Mellouli | Tunisia |
| 2nd place, silver medalist(s) | | Thomas Lurz | Germany |
| 3rd place, bronze medalist(s) | | Richard Weinberger | Canada |

The men's marathon swim over a distance of 10 kilometres at the 2012 Olympic Games in London took place on 10 August in the Serpentine at Hyde Park.

Outclassing a vast field of rivals, Tunisia's Oussama Mellouli built a historic milestone as the first ever swimmer to capture Olympic titles in both pool and open water. Around the 7 km mark, Mellouli quickly opened up a three-body-length lead over a small pack of swimmers, and maintained a fast pace to claim his second gold and third career medal in 1:49:55.1. Chasing for two more Olympic medals in a grueling race, Germany's Thomas Lurz finished behind the leader by 3.4 seconds with a silver in 1:49:58.5, while Canada's Richard Weinberger, who pulled off a powerful lead on the first lap, grabbed the bronze in 1:50:00.3.

Greece's Spyridon Gianniotis, the reigning world champion, mounted a spirited challenge against Mellouli, Lurz and Weinberger in pursuit, but dropped back in the last 200 metres to fourth in 1:50:05.3. Enjoying a massive support from the home crowd at Hyde Park, Great Britain's Daniel Fogg struggled to maintain his form after the fourth lap, but pushed himself further from behind with a spectacular swim to claim a fifth spot in 1:50:37.3. Fogg was followed in sixth and seventh respectively by Russian duo Sergey Bolshakov (1:50:40.1) and Vladimir Dyatchin (1:50:42.8), while Lurz's teammate Andreas Waschburger, who led both the third and fourth lap ahead of Mellouli and Weinberger, faded down the stretch to pick up the eighth spot in 1:50:44.4. Bulgaria's four-time Olympian Petar Stoychev finished ninth in 1:50:46.2 to hold off an American open water swimmer Alex Meyer (1:50:48.2) by exactly two seconds.

As the remaining swimmers completed the race, Guam's 16-year-old teen Benjamin Schulte fought off audaciously throughout the open-water course to round out the field with a twenty-fifth place time in 2:03:35.1.

== Qualification ==
The men's 10 km open water marathon at the 2012 Olympics featured a field of 25 swimmers:

- 10: the top-10 finishers in the 10 km race at the 2011 FINA World Championships.
- 9: the top-9 finishers at the 2012 Olympic Marathon Swim Qualifier (8–9 June 2012 in Setúbal, Portugal).
- 5: one representative from each FINA continent (Africa, Americas, Asia, Europe and Oceania). (These were selected based on the finishes at the qualifying race in Setúbal.)
- 1: from the host nation (Great Britain) if not qualified by other means. If Great Britain already had a qualifier in the race, this spot was allocated back into the general pool from the 2012 qualifying race.

== Results ==
| Rank | Athlete | Nation | Time | Time behind | Notes |
|---|---|---|---|---|---|
| 1st place, gold medalist(s) | Oussama Mellouli | Tunisia | 1:49:55.1 | | |
| 2nd place, silver medalist(s) | Thomas Lurz | Germany | 1:49:58.5 | +3.4 | |
| 3rd place, bronze medalist(s) | Richard Weinberger | Canada | 1:50:00.3 | +5.2 | |
| 4 | Spyridon Gianniotis | Greece | 1:50:05.3 | +10.2 | |
| 5 | Daniel Fogg | Great Britain | 1:50:37.3 | +42.2 | |
| 6 | Sergey Bolshakov | Russia | 1:50:40.1 | +45.0 | |
| 7 | Vladimir Dyatchin | Russia | 1:50:42.8 | +47.7 | |
| 8 | Andreas Waschburger | Germany | 1:50:44.4 | +49.3 | Warning |
| 9 | Petar Stoychev | Bulgaria | 1:50:46.2 | +51.1 | |
| 10 | Alex Meyer | United States | 1:50:48.2 | +53.1 | |
| 11 | Julien Sauvage | France | 1:50:51.3 | +56.2 | |
| 12 | Hercules Troyden Prinsloo | South Africa | 1:50:52.9 | +57.8 | Warning |
| 12 | Erwin Maldonado | Venezuela | 1:50:52.9 | +57.8 | |
| 14 | Igor Chervynskiy | Ukraine | 1:50:56.9 | +1:01.8 | |
| 15 | Yasunari Hirai | Japan | 1:51:20.1 | +1:25.0 | Warning |
| 16 | Brian Ryckeman | Belgium | 1:51:27.1 | +1:32.0 | |
| 17 | Valerio Cleri | Italy | 1:51:29.5 | +1:34.4 | |
| 18 | Csaba Gercsák | Hungary | 1:51:30.9 | +1:35.8 | |
| 19 | Arseniy Lavrentyev | Portugal | 1:51:37.2 | +1:42.1 | |
| 20 | Ky Hurst | Australia | 1:51:41.3 | +1:46.2 | |
| 21 | Ivan Enderica Ochoa | Ecuador | 1:52:28.6 | +2:33.5 | |
| 22 | Yuriy Kudinov | Kazakhstan | 1:52:59.0 | +3:03.9 | |
| 23 | Francisco Hervás | Spain | 1:53:27.8 | +3:32.7 | |
| 24 | Mazen Metwaly | Egypt | 1:54:33.2 | +4:38.1 | Warning |
| 25 | Benjamin Schulte | Guam | 2:03:35.1 | +13:40.0 | |
