= Luis Coronado =

Guatemalan weightlifter

Personal information
- Nationality: Guatemalan
- Born: 20 September 1969 (age 55)

Sport
- Sport: Weightlifting

Luis Coronado (born 20 September 1969) is a Guatemalan weightlifter. He competed in the men's middleweight event at the 1992 Summer Olympics.
