= Lin Wensheng =

Chinese weightlifter

Personal information
- Nationality: Chinese
- Born: 6 June 1970 (age 54)

Sport
- Sport: Weightlifting

Lin Wensheng (born 6 June 1970) is a Chinese weightlifter. He competed in the men's middleweight event at the 1992 Summer Olympics.
