= Abbas Talebi =

Iranian weightlifter

Personal information
- Nationality: Iranian
- Born: 31 December 1967 (age 58)

Sport
- Sport: Weightlifting

Abbas Talebi (Persian: عباس طالبی; born 31 December 1967) is an Iranian weightlifter. He competed in the men's middleweight event at the 1992 Summer Olympics.
