= Kim Mi-gyeong (athlete) =

South Korean long-distance runner

Personal information
- Nationality: South Korean
- Born: 19 February 1967 (age 59)

Sport
- Sport: Long-distance running
- Event: Marathon

Kim Mi-gyeong (born 19 February 1967) is a South Korean long-distance runner. She competed in the women's marathon at the 1988 Summer Olympics.
