= Nicolae Nițu =

Romanian weightlifter

Personal information
- Nationality: Romanian
- Born: 14 October 1969 (age 55); Bucharest, Romania

Sport
- Sport: Weightlifting

Nicolae Nițu (born 14 October 1969) is a Romanian weightlifter. He competed in the men's middleweight event at the 1992 Summer Olympics.
