= Weightlifting at the 1992 Summer Olympics – Men's 75 kg =

Weightlifting at the Olympics

Men's 75 kg at the Games of the XXV Olympiad
- Venue: Pavelló de l'Espanya Industrial
- Date: 30 July 1992
- Competitors: 34 from 27 nations
- Winning total: 357.5 kg

Medalists
1st place, gold medalist(s)		Tudor Casapu	Unified Team
2nd place, silver medalist(s)		Pablo Lara	Cuba
3rd place, bronze medalist(s)		Kim Myong-nam	North Korea

The Men's Middleweight Weightlifting Event (– 75 kg) is the fifth lightest men's event at the weightlifting competition, limiting competitors to a maximum of 75 kilograms of body mass. The competition took place on 30 July in the Pavelló de l'Espanya Industrial.

Each lifter performed in both the snatch and clean and jerk lifts, with the final score being the sum of the lifter's best result in each. The athlete received three attempts in each of the two lifts; the score for the lift was the heaviest weight successfully lifted. Ties were broken by the lifter with the lightest body weight.

== Results ==
Rank	Name	Body Weight	Snatch (kg)			Clean & Jerk (kg)			Total (kg)
Rank	Name	Body Weight	1	2	3	1	2	3	Total (kg)
1st place, gold medalist(s)	Fedor Kassapu (EUN)	74.50	155.0	~~160.0~~	~~160.0~~	~~200.0~~	200.0	202.5	357.5
2nd place, silver medalist(s)	Pablo Lara (CUB)	74.75	155.0	~~160.0~~	~~160.0~~	195.0	200.0	202.5	357.5
3rd place, bronze medalist(s)	Kim Myong-Nam (PRK)	74.05	~~162.5~~	~~162.5~~	162.5	190.0	~~195.0~~	~~195.0~~	352.5
4	Andrzej Kozłowski (POL)	74.80	~~155.0~~	155.0	160.0	192.5	~~197.5~~	~~197.5~~	352.5
5	Ingo Steinhöfel (GER)	74.30	155.0	~~160.0~~	~~160.0~~	185.0	192.5	~~197.5~~	347.5
6	Raúl Mora (CUB)	74.80	145.0	~~150.0~~	150.0	190.0	195.0	~~200.0~~	345.0
7	Włodzimierz Chlebosz (POL)	74.70	150.0	155.0	~~157.5~~	185.0	~~190.0~~	~~190.0~~	340.0
8	Lu Gang (CHN)	74.40	~~150.0~~	~~150.0~~	150.0	185.0	~~190.0~~	~~190.0~~	335.0
9	Lin Wensheng (CHN)	74.10	145.0	~~150.0~~	~~150.0~~	187.5	~~195.0~~	~~195.0~~	332.5
10	Oleg Sadikov (ISR)	74.20	152.5	~~157.5~~	~~157.5~~	180.0	~~190.0~~	~~190.0~~	332.5
11	Choi Byeong-chan (KOR)	74.00	142.5	147.5	~~150.0~~	182.5	~~187.5~~	~~187.5~~	330.0
12	Muharrem Süleymanoğlu (TUR)	74.60	150.0	155.0	~~157.5~~	175.0	-	-	330.0
13	Ron Laycock (AUS)	74.95	135.0	140.0	142.5	180.0	~~185.0~~	185.0	327.5
14	Aleksandrs Žerebkovs (LAT)	74.45	150.0	~~155.0~~	~~155.0~~	175.0	~~182.5~~	~~182.5~~	325.0
15	Pak Ui-myong (PRK)	74.80	140.0	~~145.0~~	~~145.0~~	185.0	~~192.5~~	~~192.5~~	325.0
16	Oliver Caruso (GER)	74.90	~~145.0~~	145.0	~~150.0~~	172.5	~~180.0~~	180.0	325.0
17	Álvaro Velasco (COL)	74.55	140.0	145.0	~~147.5~~	172.5	177.5	~~182.5~~	322.5
18	Hamdy Basiony Hassan (EGY)	74.00	135.0	~~140.0~~	142.5	172.5	177.5	~~180.0~~	320.0
19	Nicolae Nițu (ROU)	74.45	~~135.0~~	135.0	~~140.0~~	180.0	185.0	~~190.0~~	320.0
20	Abbas Talebi (IRI)	74.65	142.5	147.5	~~150.0~~	172.5	~~180.0~~	~~180.0~~	320.0
21	Hideo Mizuno (JPN)	74.00	137.5	~~142.5~~	~~142.5~~	175.0	180.0	~~187.5~~	317.5
22	Damian Brown (AUS)	74.55	135.0	140.0	~~145.0~~	172.5	177.5	~~180.0~~	317.5
23	I Nyoman Sudarma (INA)	73.35	~~140.0~~	140.0	~~145.0~~	170.0	175.0	~~182.5~~	315.0
24	Mats Lindqvist (SWE)	74.60	142.5	~~147.5~~	~~147.5~~	170.0	~~172.5~~	~~172.5~~	312.5
25	Panagiotis Grammatikopoulos (GRE)	74.65	130.0	~~135.0~~	~~137.5~~	172.5	~~177.5~~	~~177.5~~	302.5
26	Tony Morgan (GBR)	74.95	130.0	135.0	137.5	155.0	~~165.0~~	165.0	302.5
27	Henrik Andersen (DEN)	74.90	130.0	~~135.0~~	~~135.0~~	~~165.0~~	165.0	167.5	297.5
28	Luis Coronado (GUA)	73.10	125.0	~~130.0~~	130.0	~~160.0~~	160.0	165.0	295.0
29	Leslie Ata (SOL)	74.95	~~105.0~~	~~105.0~~	105.0	~~130.0~~	130.0	~~135.0~~	235.0
30	Edgar Molinos (GUM)	70.25	87.5	92.5	95.0	115.0	120.0	125.0	220.0
31	Uasi Vi Kohinoa (TGA)	74.50	85.0	~~90.0~~	~~90.0~~	~~110.0~~	110.0	115.0	200.0
32	Mubarak Fadl El-Moula (SUD)	72.45	~~80.0~~	85.0	90.0	~~115.0~~	~~120.0~~	-	DNF
33	Moustafa Allozy (EGY)	74.60	~~135.0~~	135.0	~~140.0~~	~~170.0~~	~~170.0~~	~~170.0~~	DNF
34	Gombodorjiin Enebish (MGL)	74.70	~~150.0~~	~~150.0~~	~~150.0~~	-	-	-	DNF
