= Henrik Andersen (weightlifter) =

Danish weightlifter (born 1967)

Personal information
- Nationality: Danish
- Born: 23 February 1967 (age 58); Aalborg, Denmark

Sport
- Sport: Weightlifting

Henrik Andersen (born 23 February 1967) is a Danish weightlifter. He competed in the men's middleweight event at the 1992 Summer Olympics.
