= María del Pilar (athlete) =

Guatemalan long-distance runner

Personal information
- Nationality: Guatemalan
- Born: 12 October 1954 (age 71)

Sport
- Sport: Long-distance running
- Event: Marathon

María del Pilar (born 12 October 1954) is a Guatemalan long-distance runner. She competed in the women's marathon at the 1988 Summer Olympics.
