= EuroCyclingTrips Pro Cycling =

Guamanian cycling team

EuroCyclingTrips - CCN
Team information
- UCI code: ECT
- Registered: Guam
- Discipline: Road
- Status: UCI Continental

Key personnel
- General manager: Lara Ferrin

Team name history
- 2011; 2012; 2013–2014; 2015–2019; 2020–2021; 2022–2023; 2024; 2025; 2026: Equipe CMI/BST; Equipe CMI/Trilogy Group; Equipe CMI/Greenover; Equipe CMI; EuroCyclingTrips–CMI; EuroCyclingTrips Pro Cycling; EuroCyclingTrips–Yoeleo; EuroCyclingTrips–CCN; EuroCyclingTrips–CCN

EuroCyclingTrips–CCN is a UCI Continental cycling team based in the United States territory of Guam.

== Overview ==
The team is based in Guam but is part of Equipe CMI, which has cycling and triathlon clubs in the United States and France.

It is closely tied to EuroCyclingTrips, which offers cycling tours in Europe guided by current and former professionals such as Siméon Green and David McKenzie. The sports director in 2020 was Colin Sturgess of Great Britain with Dirk Van Hove of Belgium serving from 2020 - 2022. Since 2022 the Sports Directors have been ex-Team riders Mathieu Perget of France and John Delong of the US. Since 2025 the Sports Director has been ex-Team rider Guillaume Soula of France.

In 2024 the team partnered with bicycle manufacturer Yoeleo who joined as a second naming rights sponsor, meaning the team name was officially changed to EuroCyclingTrips - Yoeleo and the team's UCI code was changed to ECT.

== Current roster ==
As of 29 May 2026

Rider	Date of birth
Dan Aponik (GUM)	17 May 1972 (age 54)
Blayde Blas (GUM)	19 August 2002 (age 24)
David Drouin (CAN)	20 July 1995 (age 31)
Owen Musset (FRA)	27 August 2002 (age 24)
Séfan Bennett (FRA)	15 April 1992 (age 34)
Siméon Green (FRA)	6 December 1979 (age 46)

Rider	Date of birth
Peter Lombard II (GUM)	24 May 1976 (age 50)
Hugo Lutz-Atkinson (GBR)	17 June 2002 (age 24)
Taj Mueller (AUS)	28 December 2000 (age 25)
Edward Oingerang (GUM)	7 December 1991 (age 34)
Thomas Peyroton-Dartet (FRA)	9 July 1985 (age 41)
Jordi Slootjes (NED)	24 September 1995 (age 31)

As of 9 June 2025

Rider	Date of birth
Dan Aponik (GUM)	17 May 1972 (age 54)
Blayde Blas (GUM)	19 August 2002 (age 24)
David Drouin (CAN)	20 July 1995 (age 31)
Alex Durrant-Whyte (AUS)	17 March 1998 (age 28)
Kahiri Endeler (PYF)	28 December 1996 (age 29)
William Goodfellow (CAN)	15 January 1988 (age 38)
Siméon Green (FRA)	6 December 1979 (age 46)

Rider	Date of birth
Derek Horton (GUM)	26 September 1972 (age 54)
Peter Lombard II (GUM)	24 May 1976 (age 50)
Hugo Lutz-Atkinson (GBR)	17 June 2002 (age 24)
Taj Mueller (AUS)	28 December 2000 (age 25)
Edward Oingerang (GUM)	7 December 1991 (age 34)
Thomas Peyroton-Dartet (FRA)	9 July 1985 (age 41)
Clovis Roy (CAN)	31 January 2004 (age 22)

== Team roster 2021 ==
As of 7 February 2021.

Rider	Date of birth
Dan Aponik (GUM)	17 May 1972 (age 54)
Boris Clark (NZL)	28 January 1995 (age 31)
Joffrey Degueurce (FRA)	24 August 1997 (age 29)
Tom Fitzpatrick (GBR)	16 November 1992 (age 33)
Matias Fitzwater (NZL)	29 March 1998 (age 28)
Siméon Green (GBR)	6 December 1979 (age 46)
Derek Horton (GUM)	26 September 1972 (age 54)
Peter Lombard II (GUM)	24 May 1976 (age 50)
Edward Oingerang (GUM)	7 December 1991 (age 34)
Jonathan Martin (GUM)	9 October 1985 (age 41)

Rider	Date of birth
Robert Orr (GBR)	1 October 1980 (age 46)
Thomas Peyroton Dartet (FRA)	9 July 1985 (age 41)
Gorgi Popstefanov (MKD)	19 July 1987 (age 39)
Alexander Smyth (MLT)	10 December 1988 (age 37)
Guillaume Soula (FRA)	29 October 1980 (age 46)
Nikolas Zegklis (GRE)	5 July 1996 (age 30)
Niels Verdijck (BEL)	9 August 1993 (age 33)
Rick Nobel (NED)	26 September 1994 (age 32)
Bart Buijk (NED)	1 May 1993 (age 33)

== Major wins ==
2022
Overall Tour de Guadeloupe, Stéfan Bennett
2023
Stage 1 Tour de Maurice, Stéfan Bennett
