= Rosmarie Müller =

Swiss long-distance runner

Rosmarie Müller (born March 27, 1958) is a retired female long-distance runner from Switzerland. She set her personal best (2:35:26) in the marathon in 1988.

== Achievements ==
- All results regarding marathon, unless stated otherwise

Year	Competition	Venue	Position	Notes
Representing Switzerland
1988	Olympic Games	Seoul, South Korea	48th	2:47:31
