= Choi Byeong-chan =

South Korean weightlifter

Personal information
- Nationality: South Korean
- Born: 20 April 1969 (age 55)

Sport
- Sport: Weightlifting

Choi Byeong-chan (born 20 April 1969) is a South Korean weightlifter. He competed in the men's middleweight event at the 1992 Summer Olympics.
