= Judo at the 2019 Pacific Games =

Judo competition

- Venue: Faleata Sports Complex
- Location: Apia, Samoa
- Dates: 16–17 July 2019

Judo at the 2019 Pacific Games was held on 16–17 July 2019 in Apia, Samoa.

== Medal summary ==
=== Medal table ===
* Host nation (Samoa)

Rank	Nation	Gold	Silver	Bronze	Total
1	New Caledonia	10	8	5	23
2	Fiji	4	2	2	8
3	Tahiti	3	6	10	19
4	Guam	1	0	0	1
5	Tonga	0	1	2	3
6	Papua New Guinea	0	1	1	2
7	Samoa*	0	0	4	4
8	Nauru	0	0	3	3
9	Solomon Islands	0	0	2	2
10	Vanuatu	0	0	1	1
Totals (10 entries)		18	18	30	66

=== Men's events ===
Event	Gold	Silver	Bronze
−60 kg	Charles Cure; New Caledonia	Cameron Fayard; New Caledonia	Tony Lomo; Solomon Islands
−60 kg	Charles Cure; New Caledonia	Cameron Fayard; New Caledonia	Maxence Cugola; Vanuatu
−66 kg	David Mai; New Caledonia	Ugo Langlois; New Caledonia	Tylon Benjamin; Nauru
−66 kg	David Mai; New Caledonia	Ugo Langlois; New Caledonia	Gaston Descamps; Tahiti
−73 kg	Jason Appavou; New Caledonia	Jeremy Le Corvaisier; New Caledonia	Alistar Sukhamana; Solomon Islands
−73 kg	Jason Appavou; New Caledonia	Jeremy Le Corvaisier; New Caledonia	Gaston Lafon; Tahiti
−81 kg	Joshter Andrew; Guam	Toanui Lucas; Tahiti	Peniamina Percival; Samoa
−81 kg	Joshter Andrew; Guam	Toanui Lucas; Tahiti	Maevarau Le Gayic; Tahiti
−90 kg	William Fayard; New Caledonia	Julien Ragusa; Tahiti	David Chevalier; Tahiti
−90 kg	William Fayard; New Caledonia	Julien Ragusa; Tahiti	Ovini Uera; Nauru
−100 kg	Romain Desfour; Tahiti	Claude Cretin; New Caledonia	Sailosi Ealelei; Tonga
−100 kg	Romain Desfour; Tahiti	Claude Cretin; New Caledonia	Joshua Kam; Nauru
+100 kg	Teva Gouriou; New Caledonia	David Put; New Caledonia	Finetu'ui Moala; Tonga
+100 kg	Teva Gouriou; New Caledonia	David Put; New Caledonia	Derek Sua; Samoa
Lightweight Open	Jason Appavou; New Caledonia	Ugo Langlois; New Caledonia	David Mai; New Caledonia
Lightweight Open	Jason Appavou; New Caledonia	Ugo Langlois; New Caledonia	Gaston Lafon; Tahiti
Heavyweight Open	Cyril Gaudemer; Tahiti	Finetu'ui Moala; Tonga	William Fayard; New Caledonia
Heavyweight Open	Cyril Gaudemer; Tahiti	Finetu'ui Moala; Tonga	Teva Gouriou; New Caledonia
Team	New Caledonia	Tahiti	Samoa

=== Women's events ===
Event	Gold	Silver	Bronze
−57 kg	Rosa Delots; New Caledonia	Jaycee Brival; New Caledonia	Laetitia Wuilmet; Tahiti
−57 kg	Rosa Delots; New Caledonia	Jaycee Brival; New Caledonia	Maria Annette Gay; Samoa
−63 kg	Nathalyn Takayawa; Fiji	Teipoteani Tevenino; Tahiti	Teraimatuatini Bopp; Tahiti
−63 kg	Nathalyn Takayawa; Fiji	Teipoteani Tevenino; Tahiti	Maiwen Mezieres; New Caledonia
−70 kg	Shanice Takayawa; Fiji	Poerava Temakeu; Tahiti	not awarded
−78 kg	Keresi Farouk; Fiji	Kay Cee Keneke; Papua New Guinea	Blossom Yee Joy; Fiji
+78 kg	Rauhiti Vernaudon; Tahiti	Elizabeth Valentine; Fiji	Marie Keneke; Papua New Guinea
Lightweight Open	Jaycee Brival; New Caledonia	Rosa Delots; New Caledonia	Cloe Omo-Perraut; New Caledonia
Lightweight Open	Jaycee Brival; New Caledonia	Rosa Delots; New Caledonia	Veniana Ravesi; Fiji
Heavyweight Open	Shanice Takayawa; Fiji	Poerava Temakeu; Tahiti	Teraimatuatini Bopp; Tahiti
Heavyweight Open	Shanice Takayawa; Fiji	Poerava Temakeu; Tahiti	Rauhiti Vernaudon; Tahiti
Team	New Caledonia	Fiji	Tahiti

== See also ==
- Judo at the Pacific Games
