= Im Eun-ju (runner) =

South Korean long-distance runner

Personal information
- Nationality: South Korean
- Born: 5 March 1961 (age 65)

Sport
- Sport: Long-distance running
- Event: Marathon

Im Eun-ju (born 5 March 1961) is a South Korean long-distance runner. She competed in the women's marathon at the 1988 Summer Olympics.

She won the 35th Chosun Ilbo Marathon in November 1981 with a time of 3:00:16, setting the first official South Korean women's marathon national record.
