= Apollinarie Nyinawabéra =

Rwandan long-distance runner

Personal information
- Nationality: Rwandan
- Born: 1962 (age 63–64)

Sport
- Sport: Long-distance running
- Event: Marathon

Apollinarie Nyinawabéra (born 1962) is a Rwandan long-distance runner. She competed in the women's marathon at the 1988 Summer Olympics.
