= Manuel García (cyclist) =

Guamanian cyclist

Personal information
- Born: 20 March 1964 (age 62)

Cycling career
- Sport: Cycling

Manuel García (born 20 March 1964) is a former cyclist from Guam. He competed in four events at the 1992 Summer Olympics.
