= Jan Iriarte =

Guamanian windsurfer (born 1962)

Personal information
- Full name: Jan Ivan Iriarte
- Nationality: Guamanian
- Born: 4 October 1962 (age 62); San Diego, California, U.S.
- Height: 183 cm (6 ft 0 in)
- Weight: 70 kg (154 lb)

Sailing career
- Class(es): Lechner, Mistral

Jan Ivan Iriarte (born 4 October 1962) is a Guamanian windsurfer. He competed in the 1988 Summer Olympics, the 1992 Summer Olympics, and the 1996 Summer Olympics.
