= Philam Garcia =

Guam sprinter

Personal information
- Nationality: Guam
- Born: 5 February 1980 (age 46) California, U.S.

Sport
- Sport: Sprinting
- Event: 100 metres

Philam Garcia (born 5 February 1980) is a Guam sprinter. He competed in the men's 100 metres at the 2000 Summer Olympics.

Garcia is the son of Filipino-American cyclist Jesus A. Garcia Jr. Philam's brother Jazy Garcia is also a cyclist.

Garcia graduated from John F. Kennedy High School. After his athletic career, he served as the head sprinting coach at Southwestern College in Chula Vista, California, where he developed Curtis Mitchell.
