= Sheila Cummings =

Native American aerospace engineer and entrepreneur

- Born: Pembroke, North Carolina
- Education: University of North Carolina at Pembroke; University of Maryland
- Known for: Founder of Cummings Aerospace
- Awards: State of Alabama Engineering Hall of Fame 2020 Class

Sheila Cummings is a Native American aerospace engineer and entrepreneur. Cummings is the founder of Cummings Aerospace Inc., a Native American woman owned business that provides opportunities for young women who are wanting to pursue a career in STEM.

== Early life and education ==
Cummings is a member of the Lumbee Cheraw tribe and grew up in a rural small-town community in Pembroke, North Carolina. Cummings began her educational career at the University of North Carolina at Pembroke. In 1995, she transferred to the University of Maryland where she graduated with a bachelor's degree in aerospace engineering.

== Career ==
Cummings entered into the engineering industry working as a spacecraft thermal engineer with the focus of advanced technology satellites for the Naval Research Laboratory in Washington, D.C. She quickly became a government civilian and transferred to the Missile Defense Projects/Agency where she transitioned into becoming a contractor. Cumming's worked on the kinetic energy interceptor program. Along the way, Cummings served as vice president for a small engineering company in Arlington, Virginia and worked on missile defense programs as a systems engineer in Huntsville, Alabama.

Cummings left the missile defense programs to start her own aerospace business, Cummings Aerospace Inc. in 2009, located in Huntsville, Alabama. As of 2009 when the company was established, Cummings is the standing CEO and founder of all operations for the company. Her company specializes in software development, modeling and simulation, digital engineering, and systems engineering. Their focus is technologies and flight science solutions for aerospace systems which helps support the Department of Defense.

Cummings Aerospace Inc. has partnerships with federal defense contractors such as Northrop Grumman, Raytheon, Lockheed Martin, & Boeing. Cummings Aerospace Inc. performs direct contract work for the United States Department of Defense. Along with her business, Cummings created a two-week summer camp called Cummings Aerospace Engineering Camp, which helps introduce students to many different STEM related careers such as robotics, 3D printing, coding, & 3D design.

Since 2009, as her company increased, Cummings was able to open multiple locations for her business, such as in Alabama, Largo and Niceville, Florida, and a new location in Tucson, Arizona with over 90 employees spread throughout each location.

== Achievements ==
In 2020, Cummings was inducted into the State of Alabama Engineering Hall of Fame as a part of the 2020 class. Cummings was also named to This is Alabama's List of 25 women who shaped Alabama.
