= Melissa Fejeran =

Guam weightlifter

Personal information
- Born: June 17, 1976 (age 50)
- Height: 149 cm (4 ft 11 in)
- Weight: 58 kg (128 lb)

Sport
- Sport: Weightlifting

Melissa Lynn Q. Fejeran (born June 17, 1976) is a retired weightlifter from Guam. She placed 15th in the lightweight division at the 2000 Olympics, where she also served as the Olympic flag bearer for Guam.
