= Edgar Molinos =

Guamanian weightlifter

Personal information
- Nationality: Guamanian
- Born: 28 August 1971 (age 53)

Sport
- Sport: Weightlifting

Edgar Molinos (born 28 August 1971) is a Guamanian weightlifter. He competed in the men's middleweight event at the 1992 Summer Olympics.
