= Martin Santos =

Guamanian cyclist

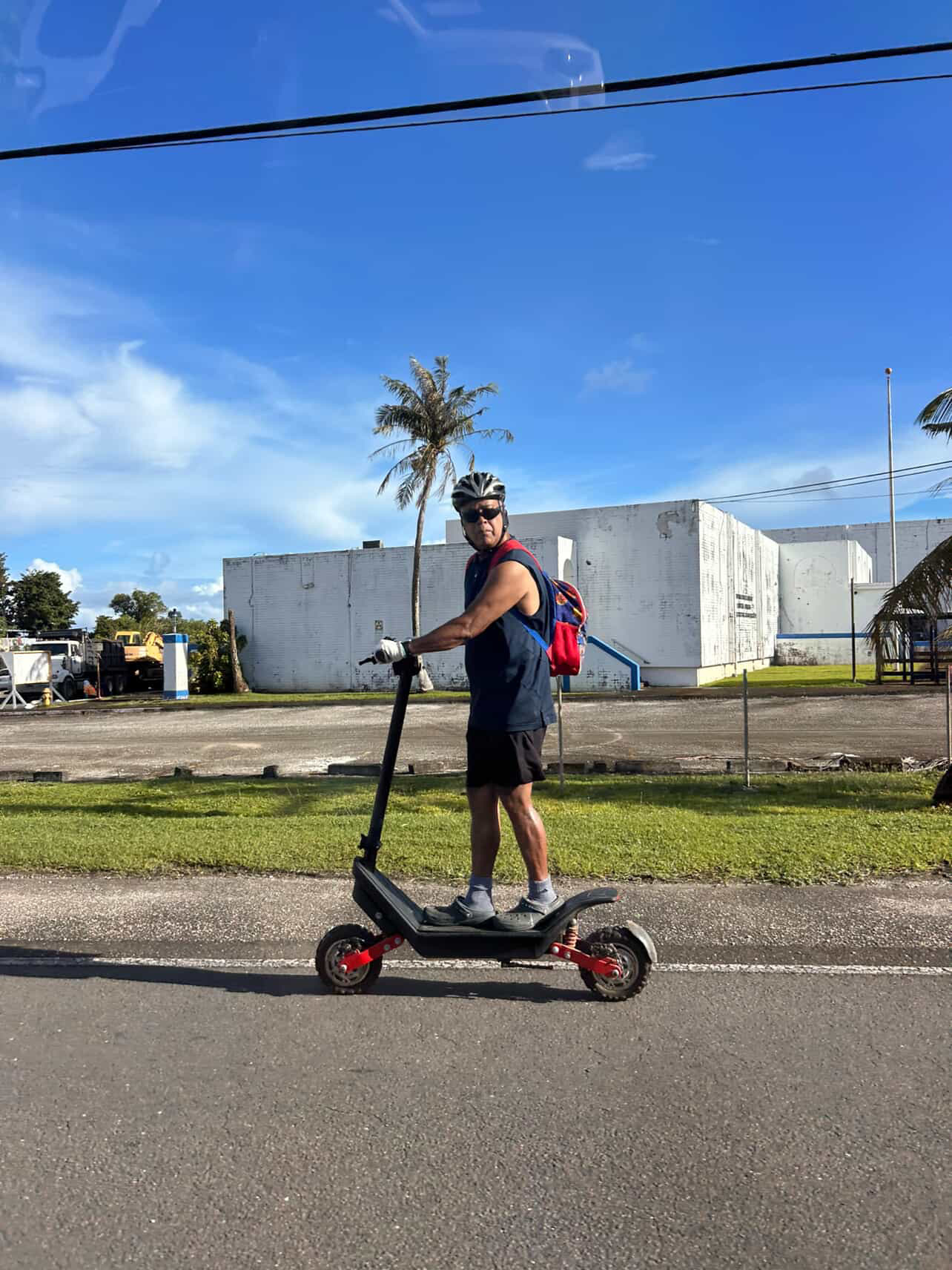
- Santos in 2025

Personal information
- Born: 20 August 1962 (age 64)

Cycling career
- Sport: Cycling

Martin Santos (born 20 August 1962) is a former cyclist from Guam. He competed in three events at the 1992 Summer Olympics.
