= Margaret Bean =

Guamian cyclist

Personal information
- Full name: Margaret E. Bean
- Born: 18 June 1953 (age 73) Guam

Cycling career
- Sport: Cycling
- Disciplines: Road cycling, Track cycling
- Role: Rider

Margaret E. Bean (born 18 June 1953) is a track and road cyclist from Guam. She represented her nation at the 1992 Summer Olympics on the road in the women's road race and on the track in the women's individual pursuit.
