= Arlene Vincent Mark =

Grenadian long-distance runner

Arlene Vincent-Mark
Personal information
- Full name: Arlene Vincent-Mark
- Nationality: Grenada
- Born: 6 October 1954 (age 71)
- Height: 5 ft 4 in (163 cm)
- Weight: 110 lb (50 kg)

Sport
- Event: Marathon

Achievements and titles
- Highest world ranking: 25th
- Personal best: Marathon: 3:23:56 (1984)

Arlene Vincent-Mark (born 6 October 1954) is a retired Grenadian long-distance runner who represented her country at the 1988 Summer Olympics in the women's marathon, placing 62nd.
