= Peter Lombard II =

Guamanian cyclist

Personal information
- Full name: Peter Lombard II
- Born: May 24, 1976 (age 50) Mongmong-Toto-Maite, Guam
- Height: 5 ft 7 in (170 cm)
- Weight: 161 lb (73 kg)

Cycling career
- Sport: Cycling
- Current team: EuroCyclingTrips–CCN
- Disciplines: Mountain biking; Road
- Role: Rider

Professional team
- 2020–: EuroCyclingTrips–CMI

Peter Lombard II (born May 24, 1976) is a Guamanian cyclist, who currently rides for UCI Continental team EuroCyclingTrips–CCN. He rode at the cross-country event at the 2016 Summer Olympics. He was pulled from the race after he crashed twice. He is an eye surgeon and owns a clinic, Lombard Health.

== Early life and education ==
Peter Lombard II was born in Guam on May 24, 1976, to Dr. Gabriel and Mrs. Kathleen Lombard. He attended St. John's School in Tumon. Lombard attended the U.S. Naval Academy from 1995 to 1998 and earned a 4.0 GPA. He was the valedictorian. Lombard lettered four times at the academy, and was the captain of the gymnastics team. In 1998, he earned CoSIDA First Team Academic All-American honors.

Afterward, he studied at the Johns Hopkins School of Medicine. He is currently an eye surgeon and owns a clinic, Lombard Health Eye Clinic. Lombard has a daughter named Aleia. He started cycling c. 2001, and competed in triathlons. He ramped up his training regimen after returning from medical school.

== Career ==
=== Pre-Olympics ===
In February 2016, Lombard was the 2016 Guam National MTB Champion. Winning the race qualified him for the UCI Oceania Mountain Bike Cross Country Championship the next month in New Zealand. Australia, New Zealand, and Guam qualified athletes at the event.

Lombard was the only Guamanian athlete to qualify for the 2016 Summer Olympics on merit. Lombard rearranged his work schedule to allow for more training. He also took a week's absence from work to train in the mountains in Japan.

=== 2016 Summer Olympics ===
Lombard did not place at the Olympics. He had issues with his bike pedal that made it hard to clip in. At one point, the course was so slippery from rain that riders had to dismount. The faulty clip made it difficult for Lombard to re-mount his bike. He crashed in the first and second laps. He was pulled from the race after the second crash. Once the motorcycle pulled him from the race, he was at the top of a mountain and unsure where to go. He decided to cheer on the cyclists still in the race, which drew attention and was well-received by the crowd. Lombard was one of five athletes who did not finish the race. About his Olympic experience, he said, "I’m happy to be done, happy to be in one piece".

=== Post-Olympics ===
Lombard also had some crashes leading up to Rio. After the Games, he discovered he had spine issues. He received injections and took some time off, but requires spine fusion surgery in order to improve his quality of life.
