= Ricardo Blas =

Guamanian judoka (born 1954)

Ricardo C. Blas

2nd President of Oceania Continent Handball Federation
- Incumbent
- Assumed office 23 October 2014
- Preceded by: Paul Smith

Secretary General of Guam National Shooting Sports Federation
- Incumbent
- Assumed office 2013

Secretary General of Oceania National Olympic Committees
- Incumbent
- Assumed office 1 April 2009
- Preceded by: Robin E. Mitchell

President of Guam National Olympic Committee
- Incumbent
- Assumed office 1 January 1991

Personal details
- Born: 17 June 1954 (age 72)
- Sports career
- Country: Guam
- Sport: Judo
- Event: Men's +100 kg

Sports achievements and titles
- Olympic finals: 1988 Summer Olympics in +95 kg

Ricardo Blas (born 17 June 1954) is a sports administrator and a former judoka from Guam. He competed in the men's heavyweight event at the 1988 Summer Olympics.

He is the current Secretary General of Oceania National Olympic Committees and President of the Oceania Continent Handball Federation.
