= Barbara Pexa =

Guamanian swimmer

Personal information
- Born: 14 February 1975 (age 51)

Sport
- Sport: Swimming

Barbara Pexa (born 14 February 1975) is a Guamanian breaststroke swimmer. She competed in two events at the 1992 Summer Olympics.
