= Joshter Andrew =

Guamanian Olympic judoka

Personal information
- Full name: Joshter Andrew
- Born: March 11, 1998 (age 28)
Medal record
Representing Guam
Pacific Games
Gold medal – first place	2019 Apia	-81 kg

Joshter Andrew (born 11 March 1998) is a Guamanian male judoka who competed at the 2020 Summer Olympics.

== Early and personal life ==
Andrew was born on 11 March 1998 in Guam. He started training in judo in 2013. After finishing high school he moved to Japan in 2017. He received an Olympic Solidarity scholarship and he studied business law at Ryutsu Keizai University.

== Career ==
He won a gold medal in the -81 kg event at the 2019 Pacific Games in Apia, Samoa. He was selected to compete in the Judo at the 2020 Summer Olympics – Men's 81 kg where he was defeated by Akmal Murodov.
