= Frank Flores (swimmer) =

Guamanian swimmer

Personal information
- Born: 7 March 1969 (age 57)

Sport
- Sport: Swimming

Frank Flores (born 7 March 1969) is a Guamanian swimmer. He competed in two events at the 1992 Summer Olympics.
