= Mariana Ysrael =

Guamanian long-distance runner

Personal information
- Full name: Mariana Ysrael Nussbaum
- Nationality: Guam
- Born: 14 April 1963 (age 63)

Sport
- Sport: Long-distance running
- Event: Marathon

Mariana Ysrael (born 13 April 1963) is a Guam long-distance runner. She competed in the women's marathon at the 1988 Summer Olympics. Her father, Alfred, was a businessman and philanthropist. She later became a doctor, graduating from Stanford University and the UCLA, before setting up a practice in California.
