= Barbara Gayle =

Guamanian swimmer

Personal information
- Born: 6 December 1972 (age 53)

Sport
- Sport: Swimming

Barbara Gayle (born 6 December 1972) is a swimmer who represents Guam. She competed in the women's 100 metre butterfly at the 1988 Summer Olympics, finishing last, in 40th place.
