= Derek Horton =

Guam cyclist (born 1972)

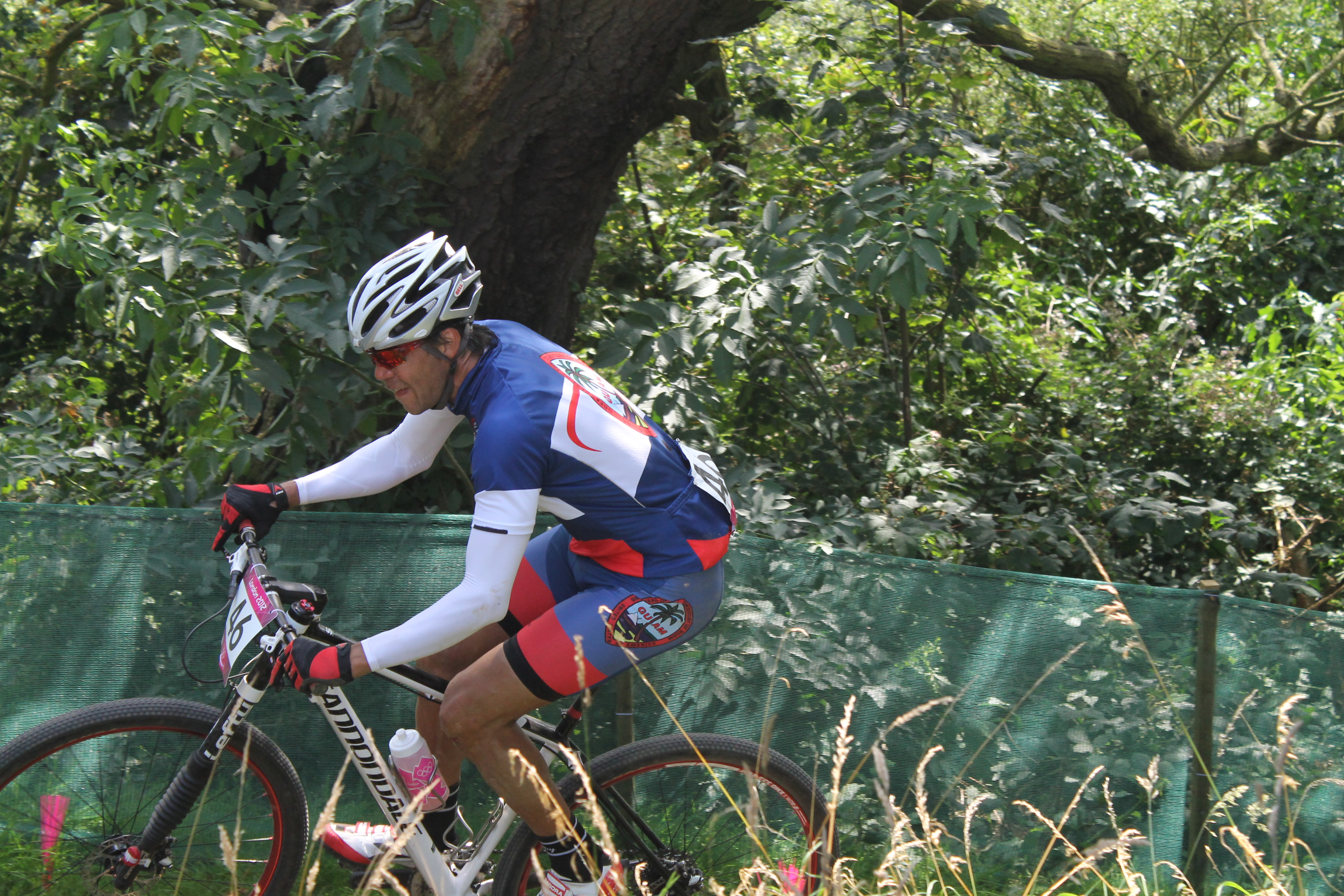
- Horton in 2012

Personal information
- Full name: Derek Horton
- Born: 26 September 1972 (age 54) Tamuning, Guam
- Height: 1.82 m (6 ft 0 in)
- Weight: 70 kg (154 lb)

Cycling career
- Sport: Cycling
- Current team: EuroCyclingTrips–CCN
- Disciplines: Mountain biking; Road
- Role: Rider

Professional team
- 2020–: EuroCyclingTrips–CMI

Derek Horton (born 26 September 1972 in Tamuning, Guam) is a Guam cross-country mountain biker and road racing cyclist, who currently rides for UCI Continental team EuroCyclingTrips–CCN.

Horton competed at the 2000 Summer Olympics in Sydney, Australia, where he became the first, and was only Guamanian mountain biker that has competed at the Olympics until 2016. He failed to finish the course.

In 2011, he competed at the Oceanian road cycling championships, what marked his return to cycling after many years of absence. The following year he once again qualified for the Olympics by virtue of his 13th place achieved at the Oceanian cross-country championships. At the 2012 Summer Olympics, he competed in the men's cross-country at Hadleigh Farm. He failed to complete the race as he was lapped.
