= Tammie Kaae =

Guamanian swimmer

Personal information
- Born: 27 September 1975 (age 50)

Sport
- Sport: Swimming

Tammie Kaae (born 27 September 1975) is a Guamanian breaststroke and medley swimmer. She competed in two events at the 1992 Summer Olympics.
