= Adrian Romero (swimmer) =

Guamanian swimmer

Personal information
- Born: 4 October 1972 (age 53)

Sport
- Sport: Swimming

Adrian Romero (born 4 October 1972) is a Guamanian freestyle swimmer. He competed in four events at the 1992 Summer Olympics.
