= Glenn Diaz =

Guamanian swimmer

Personal information
- Born: 24 October 1974 (age 51)

Sport
- Sport: Swimming

Glenn Diaz (born 24 October 1974) is a Guamanian breaststroke swimmer. He competed in three events at the 1992 Summer Olympics.
