= Ricardo Blas Jr. =

Guamanian judoka (born 1986)

Personal information
- Nationality: Chamorro
- Born: October 19, 1986 (age 40) Tamuning, Guam
- Height: 1.85 m (6 ft 1 in)
- Weight: 218 kg (481 lb)

Sport
- Country: Guam
- Sport: Judo
- Event: Men's +100 kg

Ricardo Blas Jr. (born October 19, 1986) is a judoka from Guam who competed at the 2008 and 2012 Summer Olympics. The son of Ricardo Blas, himself a judoka and Olympic competitor, Blas Jr. began training at the age of five and eventually earned the nickname "The Little Mountain" due to his weight. He entered the heavyweight event at the 2008 Games on a wild card selection as the Oceania bronze medalist, losing all his bouts in both the main and repechage stages of the competition. He participated again at the 2012 edition and was eliminated in the second round of the tournament. At 218 kg (481 lb), he is the heaviest person to have competed at the modern Olympic Games.

== Early life ==
Blas was born on October 19, 1986, the son of Ricardo Blas. The elder Blas was a judoka who competed for Guam at the 1988 Summer Olympics in Seoul, placing joint-19th in the men's heavyweight competition, after losing his only bout. Following in the footsteps of his father, who as of 2008 was serving as the president of the Guam National Olympic Committee, he began training in judo at the age of five, attended a judo college in Japan, and eventually earned the designation of being a black belt in the sport. He was larger than his peers as a child and eventually gained the nickname "The Little Mountain".

== Competitive career ==
Prior to the 2008 Summer Olympics in Beijing, Blas had found success at the international level in judo, having earned a bronze medal at the 2003 and 2007 Pacific Games, and was considered a household name in Guam. Going into the men's heavyweight event at the Games he had placed seventh in the +100 kg category at the 2007 World Judo Championships. He had also been selected as the flagbearer for his nation's six-member delegation. At the officially recorded weight of 463 lb (210 kg) he was the heaviest competitor not only at the Beijing Olympics, but most likely at any modern Olympic Games, as he surpassed the previous Olympic weight record by 44 lb (20 kg). He lost his first bout against Lasha Gujejiani of Georgia, suffering a penalty for stalling, and later claimed that he simply "froze up". He qualified for the repechage because Gujejiani reached the semifinals of the main competition, but was defeated by Daniel McCormick of the United States, having been penalized again, this time for stepping out of bounds in the final 30 seconds. In 2009 he placed second, behind Cedric Medeuf of France in the men's +100 kg event at that year's U.S. Open.

Blas returned for the 2012 Summer Olympics in London in the +100kg division, with a reported weight 218 kg (481 lb). After winning his first bout against Facinet Keita of Guinea, he was beaten by Cuba's Óscar Brayson in the second round. His defeat of Keita, however, made him the first judoka from Guam to reach the second round of an Olympic tournament.
