= Jazy Garcia =

Cyclist from Guam

Personal information
- Born: 14 July 1967 (age 59)

Cycling career
- Sport: Cycling

Jazy Garcia (born 14 July 1967) is a former cyclist from Guam. He competed at the 1992 Summer Olympics and the 2000 Summer Olympics.

Garcia is the son of Filipino-American cyclist Jesus A. Garcia Jr. Philam's brother Philam Garcia is also a sprinter.
