= Rckaela Aquino =

Guamanian freestyle wrestler

Personal information
- Born: Rckaela Maree Ramos Aquino; July 4, 1999 (age 27) Tamuning, Guam
- Height: 1.60 m (5 ft 3 in)

Sport
- Sport: Wrestling
- Event: Freestyle
Medal record
Women's freestyle wrestling
Representing Guam
2018 Micronesian Games
Gold medal – first place	2018 Yap	57 kg

Rckaela Maree Ramos Aquino (born July 4, 1999) is a Guamanian freestyle wrestler. In the 57 kg category, Aquino won gold at the 2018 Micronesian Games. She won gold at the Oceanian Championships in 2018 and 2019 as well as silver in 2017. She qualified for the women's freestyle 53 kg into the Olympic competition, by progressing to the top two finals at the 2021 African & Oceania Qualification Tournament in Hammamet, Tunisia. She was eliminated in her first match in the women's 53 kg event.

She competed in the women's 57 kg event at the 2024 Summer Olympics in Paris, France.
