= Judd Bankert =

Guam biathlete

Judd Bankert (born September 9, 1949) is a former biathlete who represented Guam at the 1988 Winter Olympics.

== Early life ==
Bankert is a Michigan native, born in Grand Rapids, raised in Lake Orion and a graduate of Michigan State University. Bankert moved to Guam in December 1981 with his wife and daughter. Bankert broke his hip in a serious fall on Guam in 1984.

== Olympic biathlon ==
In 1986, the Guam National Olympic Committee was accepted into the International Olympic Committee. In August 1987 Bankert moved with his family from Guam to Bellingham, Washington, and trained with members of the Western Washington University cross-country skiing team. His personal coach was Richard Domey, and in the fall of 1987 Bankert trained in West Yellowstone with the U.S. Olympic biathlon team. To be eligible to compete at the Winter Olympic Games, Bankert needed to successfully complete two sanctioned biathlons competitions. He finished his second such competition on February 7, 1988, just three days before the opening ceremony, at which he carried the flag of Guam as its only athlete at the 1988 Winter Olympic Games. At 38, Bankert was one of the oldest Olympic athletes at the 1988 Winter Olympic Games. This, combined with the fact that he represented a tropical island, made him a human interest story reported extensively in the media.

In the men's 10 km sprint event, Bankert missed eight out of the ten rifle targets and as a result had to ski eight penalty laps. totalling 1200 m. Bankert finished 71st of 72 starters in 45m37.1s, between Gustavo Giro of Argentina (36m38.1s) and Elliot Archilla of Puerto Rico (47m47.4s).

== Kindergarten teacher ==
In 1993, Bankert was hired by Urbana School District #116, Urbana, Illinois, and taught kindergarten at Yankee Ridge Elementary School. He was active in local school issues and advocated for changes in the manner in which school board members were elected.

== Klondike Bound ==
After the Olympics, Bankert returned to Guam as a consultant but soon returned to the United States. In 1996, as part of the Klondike Gold Rush Centennial Celebration, he organized and led "Klondike Bound", a month-long expedition by three fathers and their teenage daughters who retraced the route taken by the original "Stampeders".

== Acting career ==
He lives in Staunton, Virginia. and works as an actor, portraying President Woodrow Wilson as part of the Woodrow Wilson Presidential Library's living history program. He has also appeared as President Wilson in the 2014 History Channel miniseries The World Wars.
