= Maria Dunn (wrestler) =

Guamanian wrestler

Personal information
- Born: Maria McQueen Dunn; March 6, 1986 (age 40) Tamuning, Guam
- Height: 1.65 m (5 ft 5 in)
- Weight: 63 kg (139 lb)

Sport
- Country: Guam
- Sport: Wrestling
- Event: Women's freestyle 63 kg
Medal record
Women's Freestyle Wrestling
Representing Guam
Oceania Championships
Gold medal – first place	2007	63 kg
Gold medal – first place	2008	63 kg
Gold medal – first place	2010	63 kg
Gold medal – first place	2012	63 kg
Silver medal – second place	2002	63 kg
Silver medal – second place	2011	67 kg

Maria McQueen Dunn (born March 6, 1986) is a freestyle wrestler from Guam. She participated in Women's freestyle 63 kg at 2008 Summer Olympics losing to Elina Vaseva. She also competed in the same division at the 2012 Summer Olympics, and lost to competitor Lubov Volosova. Maria Dunn has won ten Oceania Championships in women's freestyle wrestling.

== Biography ==
=== Early life and education ===
Maria Dunn was born March 6, 1986, in Tamuning, Guam. Dunn wrestled on her high school team. Dunn's mother was worried, saying "I tried to stop her because I'm afraid for her". Her mother tried to get her into modeling, enrolling her into classes, but Dunn chose wrestling instead. Dunn's mother relented and allowed her to join the wrestling team.

Dunn was the first female college wrestler to receive an athletic scholarship at Missouri Valley College. She attended the university from 2004 to 2008. Dunn graduated with a bachelor of arts degree at the University of Guam in 2011.

=== Olympic career ===
Dunn was the first-ever Guamanian female wrestler to participate in the Olympic Games, via invitational slot or 'wild card'. She was the flagbearer for the Opening Ceremonies of the Games. Dunn finished in last place during the 2008 Summer Olympics in the women's freestyle 63 kg.

Dunn qualified for the 2012 Summer Olympics with a tripartite allocation. If the rules were the same as in 2008, she would have qualified after she won the 2012 Oceania Wrestling Championships. Dunn was one of three female wrestlers to receive a tripartite allocation, and the only female wrestler from Oceania to receive one. She trained for the 2012 Summer Olympics at the Aspull Olympic Wrestling Club (popularly known as "The Snake Pit") with Roy Wood and stayed with his family while practicing freestyle wrestling. While training in England, Maria met her future husband, English wrestler Nathan Tully. She was the flagbearer for Guam during the Opening Ceremonies, during which time she was pregnant with her first child. Dunn was pinned by Russian Lubov Volosova early in the match. Dunn believed only one of her shoulders were down, which would mean she was not pinned, and believed the official called the pin because it was near the end of the period.

=== International career ===
Dunn won silver at the 2002 Oceania Championships, and won gold at the 2007, 2008, and 2010 Oceania Championships. Dunn was named the outstanding female wrestler of the 2010 Oceania Championships. She did not lose a single match between the 2002 and 2011 Oceania Championships, and decided to move up a weight class to have more competition. She lost to New Zealand's Tayla Ford in the championship match of the 2011 Oceania Championships and took home a silver medal. She also won the 2012 Oceania Wrestling Championships, moving back to the 63 kg weight class.

=== Personal life ===
Maria married English wrestler Nathan Tully and the pair set up home together on Maria's home island of Guam. They co founded Snakepit Wrestling Academy Guam to teach Wrestling to children and young people. Their daughter, Marleya Louise, was born in 2012 and their son, Tyson Avoca, was born in 2015. Maria is a teacher and artist. She currently resides in Yigo, Guam, with her 2 children and her mother. Her husband, Nathan, died in July 2020 aged 32 after a battle with oral cancer.
