= Benjamin Schulte =

Guamanian swimmer

Personal information
- Full name: Benjamin Anthony Aguon Schulte
- Born: December 22, 1995 (age 30) Tamuning, Guam
- Height: 1.93 m (6 ft 4 in)
- Weight: 83 kg (183 lb)

Sport
- Sport: Swimming
- Events: Breaststroke, individual medley
- Club: Somerset Swim Club, Bryant University Bulldogs
- Coached by: Graeme McDonald, Katie Cameron
Medal record
Men's swimming
Representing Guam
Pacific Games
Gold medal – first place	2015 Port Moresby	200 m medley
Gold medal – first place	2015 Port Moresby	400 m medley
Silver medal – second place	2011 Nouméa	1500 m freestyle
Silver medal – second place	2015 Port Moresby	100 m breaststroke
Silver medal – second place	2019 Apia	50 m breaststroke
Bronze medal – third place	2015 Port Moresby	200 m breaststroke
Oceania Championships
Gold medal – first place	2016 Suva	50 m breaststroke
Silver medal – second place	2016 Suva	100 m breaststroke

Benjamin Anthony Aguon Schulte (born December 22, 1995) is a Guamanian swimmer. Schulte entered the international stage at 15 years old when he won a silver medal at the 2011 Pacific Games held in New Caledonia. At the 2014 Micronesian Games, Schulte was awarded medals in all 11 of his events, nine of them gold, earning him the nickname 'Micro Phelps'. At the 2015 Pacific Games, he won gold in the 200m and 400m medley, silver in the 100m breaststroke, setting a Games record in the heats that was later broken by the gold medalist in the final, and bronze in the 200m breaststroke. At the 2016 Oceania Swimming Championships, Schulte earned a gold and a silver medal.

He competed at the 2012 Summer Olympics in the Men's 10 kilometer Open Water event at only 16 years old. At the 2016 Summer Olympics, he competed for Guam in the 100 meter breaststroke, placing 43rd in the preliminary heats which did not qualify him for the semifinals. He was the flag bearer for Guam during the Parade of Nations.

== Early life and education ==
Benjamin Schulte was born in the Guamanian city of Tamuning on December 22, 1995. He studied business at Bryant University.

Schulte was taught to swim at the age of five. His family moved to Australia when he was 14 so he could better pursue his Olympic career. He attended Miami State High School in Queensland's Gold Coast.

== Olympic career ==
Schulte competed in the 2012 Summer Olympics in London at the age of 16. He discovered he had a chance to qualify for the Olympics in 2011, so he competed in a qualifying event. He failed to qualify, but a New Zealand swimmer declined a spot that was reserved for an Oceania swimmer, which he learned a month prior to the Olympics. He practiced by swimming for 9 kilometres (5.6 mi) ten times per week, going to the gym, and taking yoga classes. He finished the 10 km race with a time of 2:03:35, 14 minutes behind the winner. He was determined to finish, saying, "My goal was just to finish. Just being here, being given the opportunity to be here. I didn't want to let down my friends and family back home by not finishing." For his determination, Schulte was nominated for the Open Water Swimming Association's Swimming Man of the Year award in 2012, to which he was runner-up.

Following the 2012 Summer Olympics, Schulte decided to refocus and switch from long distance swimming to short distance. He said, "I like the competition, but I don't like the training."

Schulte competed in the 2016 Summer Olympics. The Guamanian National Olympic Committee (NOC) president Ricardo Blas told Schulte, "You deserve the opportunity and right to carry the flag and lead Guam into the Olympic Games". Schulte broke his own national record during the 2016 Summer Olympics in Rio de Janeiro, finishing the 100 meter breaststroke with a time of 1:03.29.

He had planned to compete in the 2020 Summer Olympics in Tokyo in the men's 100 meter breaststroke.

== International career ==
Schulte started his international career with the 2011 Pacific Games, where he earned a silver medal in the men's 1500 meter freestyle. Schulte also competed in the 400 meter freestyle; 50 and 100 meter breaststroke; 400 meter individual medley; 400 meter freestyle relay; and 400 meter medley relay.

Schulte set the Pacific Games and a Guamanian national record for the 100 meter breaststroke in the first heat of the 2015 Pacific Games with a time of 1:03.42. In the finals, he finished second and earned a silver medal. The winner of the race, Amini Fonua, broke the Pacific Games record he set six hours prior. He also earned two gold and one bronze medal, winning the most medals for Guam at the Games.

During the 2016 Oceania Championships, Schulte swam in the 50 and 100 meter breaststroke. In the 100 meter, he won the preliminary round, but finished second in the finals with a time of 1:03.46, earning a silver medal. For the 50 meter breaststroke, he finished second in the preliminary round; however, he edged out New Zealand swimmer Jacob Garrod with a time of 29.26 seconds to win the gold medal.

In the 2014 Micronesian Games, Schulte performed well. He earned a gold medal in 9 out of the 11 events he participated in, and was given the nickname "Micro Phelps". Schulte earned gold in the 50, 100, and 200 meter breaststroke; 4 × 100 freestyle relay; 4 × 50 medley relay; 1,500 freestyle; 200 and 400 meter individual medley; and 4 × 100 medley relay. He won a silver medal in the 100 meter butterfly and the 100 meter freestyle.
