= Patrick Sagisi =

Guamanian swimmer (born 1971)

Personal information
- Born: 1971 (age 54–55)

Sport
- Sport: Swimming
- Strokes: Backstroke, butterfly, freestyle

Patrick Carlos Sagisi (born 1971) is a former competitive swimmer from Guam.

Sagisi was born on 29 July 1971.

Sagisi competed in the 1988, 1992 and 1996 Summer Olympics for Guam, predominantly in the freestyle, backstroke and butterfly events, but never advanced past the heats.
