= Guam National Olympic Committee =

National Olympic Committee

- Country: Guam
- [[|]]
- Code: GUM
- Created: 1976
- Recognized: 1986
- Continental Association: ONOC
- President: Ricardo Blas
- Secretary General: Robert J. Steffy
- Website: http://www.oceaniasport.com/guam/

The Guam National Olympic Committee (IOC code: GUM) is the National Olympic Committee representing Guam.

== See also ==
- Guam at the Olympics
