= List of Guamanian records in athletics =

The following are the national records in athletics in Guam maintained by its national athletics federation: Guam Track and Field Association (GTFA).

== Outdoor ==
Key to tables: Awaiting ratification Record not kept by GTFA Not ratified or later rescinded GTFA

# = not officially ratified by IAAF

=== Men ===
| Event | Record | Athlete | Date | Meet | Place | Ref. |
|---|---|---|---|---|---|---|
| 100 m | 10.66 (+1.8 m/s) | Philam Garcia | 17 June 2004 | UC San Diego Triton Invitational | La Jolla, United States | |
| 200 m | 21.75 (+0.7 m/s) | David Wilson | 1 March 1996 | | Canberra, Australia | |
| 400 m | 48.29 | David Wilson | 12 April 1997 | | Palo Alto, United States | |
| 400 m | 47.59 # (Note: by IAAF source, according to the Guam Track and field Association Whitaker did not have Guam residency) | Aaron Whitaker | 13 May 2017 | GNAC Championship | Monmouth, United States | |
| 800 m | 1:53.26 | Anthony Quan | 3 April 1999 | | Seattle, United States | |
| 1500 m | 3:52.24 | Brent Butler | 24 May 1997 | | Edwardsville, United States | |
| 3000 m | 8:42.22 | Neil Weare | 27 June 2003 | South Pacific Games | Apia, Samoa | |
| 5000 m | 14:39.84 | Neil Weare | 19 April 2002 | Pomona-Pitzer Invitational | Claremont, United States | |
| 10,000 m | 31:39.24 | Johnson Lee | 18 April 2008 | Western Oregon Twilight | Monmouth, United States | |
| Half marathon | 1:11:46 | Saad El Moutawakel | 22 February 1997 | | Yigo, Guam | |
| Marathon | 2:31:04 | Wayne Blas | 14 December 2019 | | Huntsville, United States | |
| Marathon | 2:29:48 dh | Wayne Blas | 18 April 2022 | | Boston, United States | |
| 110 m hurdles | 15.50 | Kenneth Karosich | 27 June 2008 | Oceania Championships | Susupe, Northern Mariana Islands | |
| 400 m hurdles | 56.25 | Kenneth Karosich | 17 May 2008 | | Tumon, Guam | |
| 400 m hurdles | 54.6 h | Richard Bentley | 25 April 1992 | | Walla Walla, Australia | |
| 3000 m steeplechase | 9:34.04 | Brent Butler | 16 March 1996 | | Arcanta | |
| 3000 m steeplechase | 9:38.08 | Brent Butler | 16 March 1996 | | San Francisco, United States | |
| High jump | 1.90 m | Raffy Cartaciano | 7 May 2002 | | Tumon, Guam | |
| Pole vault | 2.45 m | Jude Anthony Martinez | 22 March 2008 | | Shoreline, United States | |
| Long jump | 6.86 m | Florenz Quitlong | 19 April 1994 | | Mangilao, Guam | |
| Triple jump | 14.01 m (+0.8 m/s) | David Wilson | 3 March 1996 | | Canberra, Australia | |
| Shot put | 14.63 m | Rene Delemar | 9 June 1999 | South Pacific Games | Santa Rita, Guam | |
| Discus throw | 48.29 m | Justin Andre | 10 May 2015 | Oceania Championships | Cairns, Australia | |
| Hammer throw | 55.90 m | Justin Andre | 4 April 2009 | Darrel Gourley Relays | Liberty, United States | |
| Javelin throw | 71.19 m | Jon Rozborski | 24 May 2008 | Tucson Elite Throwers Classic | Tucson, United States | |
| Decathlon | 4324 pts (ht) | Jude Anthony Martinez | 10–11 April 2008 | EWU Pelluer Invitational | Cheney, United States | |
| Decathlon | 100m / Long jump / Shot put / High jump / 400m / 110m H / Discus / Pole vault / Javelin / 1500m; 11.65 / 6.26 m / 7.78 m / 1.63 m / 52.40 / 24.3 h / 24.13 m / 2.35 m / 28.78 m / 5:14.61 | | | | | |
| 20 km walk (road) | | | | | | |
| 50 km walk (road) | | | | | | |
| 4 × 100 m relay | 43.32 | Guam; Ryan Claros; Paul Claros; David Neilsen; Philam Garcia | 8 August 1998 | Micronesian Games | Koror, Palau | |
| 4 × 400 m relay | 3:30.6 h | Guam; Florenz Quitlong; David Wilson; Anthony Quan; James Evangelista | 1 April 1994 | Micronesian Games | Mangilao, Guam | |

=== Women ===
| Event | Record | Athlete | Date | Meet | Place | Ref. |
|---|---|---|---|---|---|---|
| 100 m | 11.92 (−2.2 m/s) | Regine Tugade | 3 May 2019 | Patriot League Championships | Worcester, Massachusetts | |
| 200 m | 24.24 (+1.7 m/s) | Regine Tugade | 1 December 2023 | Pacific Games | Honiara, Solomon Islands | |
| 400 m | 57.89 | Regine Tugade | 6 May 2016 | IIAAG High School League Meet 6 | Dededo, Guam | |
| 800 m | 2:18.53 | Amy Atkinson | 8 August 2012 | Olympic Games | London, United Kingdom | |
| 1000 m | 3:08.94 | Jen Allred | 9 September 1991 | | Port Moresby, Papua New Guinea | |
| 1500 m | 4:36.13 | Debbie Cardenas | 13 April 2002 | John McDonnell Invitational | Fayetteville, United States | |
| Mile | 5:05.25 | Sloan Siegrist | 21 May 2006 | | Boston, United States | |
| 3000 m | 10:02.77 | Debbie Cardenas | 22 April 2000 | | Fayetteville, United States | |
| 5000 m | 17:13.33 | Debbie Cardenas | 29 March 2002 | | Palo Alto, United States | |
| 10,000 m | 37:12.43 | Sloan Siegrist-Palmore | 26 March 2010 | | San Francisco, United States | |
| Half marathon | 1:26:30 | Susan Seay | 28 February 1998 | | | |
| Marathon | 2:59:43 | Jen Allred | 29 February 1992 | | Pensacola, United States | |
| Marathon | 2:54:34 # | Rhonda Davidson-Alley | 2 October 1994 | | Portland, United States | |
| 100 m hurdles | 15.65 | Stefani Loisel | 18 May 2012 | | Manenggon Hills, Guam | |
| 300 m hurdles | 46.97 | Stefani Loisel | 23 May 2012 | Yokota High School Meet | Yokota, Japan | |
| 400 m hurdles | 1:04.00 | Christina Francisco | 30 April 2016 | OSU High Performance Meet | Corvallis, United States | |
| 3000 m steeplechase | 12:11.85 | Amy Atkinson | 6 September 2011 | Pacific Games | Nouméa, New Caledonia | |
| 3000 m steeplechase | 11:43.00 # | Amy Atkinson | 23 July 2011 | | Manenggon Hills, Guam | |
| High jump | 1.54 m | Linda Babao | 30 March 1990 | | Tumon, Guam | |
| Pole vault | | | | | | |
| Long jump | 5.34 m NWI | Pollara Cobb | 27 April 2014 | UAA Championships | Chicago, United States | |
| Long jump | 5.34 m (±0.0 m/s) | Regine Tugade-Watson | 24 June 2023 | Oceania Cup | Saipan, Northern Mariana Islands | |
| Triple jump | 11.01 m NWI | Regine Tugade | 13 May 2016 | IIAAG High School All-Island | Dededo, Guam | |
| Shot put | 11.09 m | Genie Gerardo | 10 June 2017 | Guamanian Championships | Agana Heights, Guam | |
| Shot put | 11.17 m # | Debbie Denham | 20 May 1983 | | Tumon, Guam | |
| Discus throw | 36.75 m | Tahnisha Manibusan | 28 April 2017 | | Lebanon, United States | |
| Hammer throw | 36.25 m | Genie Gerardo | 27 May 2011 | | Susupe, Saipan, Northern Mariana Islands | |
| Javelin throw | 30.74 m (new design) | Lianna Urbina | 24 May 2013 | | Yona, Guam | |
| Javelin throw | 36.08 m (old design) | Marie Fernsler | 19 April 1996 | | Mangilao, Guam | |
| Heptathlon | | | | | | |
| Heptathlon | 100m H / High jump / Shot put / 200m / Long jump / Javelin / 800m | | | | | |
| 20 km walk (road) | | | | | | |
| 50 km walk (road) | | | | | | |
| 4 × 100 m relay | 49.49 | Guam; Tara Perez-Stefy; Corrine Neilsen; Aubrey Posadas; Jackqueline Baza | 11 June 1999 | South Pacific Games | Santa Rita, Guam | |
| 4 × 400 m relay | 4:11.33 | Guam; Corrine Neilsen; Aubrey Posadas; Tara Perez-Stefy; Jackqueline Baza | 11 June 1999 | South Pacific Games | Santa Rita, Guam | |

^{‡}: wind assisted by another source

=== Mixed ===
| Event | Record | Athletes | Date | Meet | Place | Ref. |
|---|---|---|---|---|---|---|
| 4 × 400 m relay | 4:05.15 | Guam | 7 June 2024 | Oceania Championships | Suva, Fiji | |

== Indoor ==
=== Men ===
| Event | Record | Athlete | Date | Meet | Place | Ref. |
|---|---|---|---|---|---|---|
| 55 m | 6.79 | Justin Andre | 9 February 2003 | | | |
| 60 m | 7.11 | Bleu Perez | 24 February 2017 | WAC Championships | Nampa, United States | |
| 60 m | 7.04 | Joseph Green | 1 March 2024 | World Championships | Glasgow, United Kingdom | |
| 200 m | 22.49 | Aaron Whitaker | 20 February 2016 | GNAC Championships | Nampa, United States | |
| 300 m | 34.74 OT | Jude Martinez | 15 January 2011 | | Seattle, United States | |
| 400 m | 48.53 | Aaron Whitaker | 20 February 2016 | GNAC Championships | Nampa, United States | |
| 600 m | 1:22.04 | Aaron Whitaker | 16 January 2016 | UW Preview | Seattle, United States | |
| 800 m | 2:04.42 | David Townsell | 9 January 2010 | NW Open | Minneapolis, United States | |
| 800 m | 1:54.82 OT | Anthony Quan | February 1999 | | Moscow, United States | |
| 1000 m | 2:41.16 | David Townsell | 26 February 2010 | NSIC Conference Championships | Mankato, United States | |
| 1500 m | 5:03.37y (Note: by World Athletics source; 5:03.27 by Hilltop Invitational Result Sheet) | David Townsell | 7 February 2009 | Hilltop Invitational | Mount Vernon, United States | |
| 1500 m | 4:21.65y OT | Derek Mandell | 10 February 2007 | | Seattle, United States | |
| Mile | 5:03.37 (Note: by World Athletics source; 5:03.27 by Hilltop Invitational Result Sheet) | David Townsell | 7 February 2009 | Hilltop Invitational | Mount Vernon, United States | |
| Mile | 4:48.14 | David Townsell | 6 February 2010 | Ted Nelson Classic | Mankato, United States | |
| Mile | 4:21.65 OT | Derek Mandell | 15 February 2007 | | Seattle, United States | |
| 3000 m | 9:10.30 | Neil Weare | 13 February 1999 | | Portland, United States | |
| 3000 m | 8:59.44 OT | Derek Mandell | 10 March 2007 | | Seattle, United States | |
| 5000 m | 18:49.36 | David Townsell | 14 February 2009 | | Storm Lake, United States | |
| 5000 m | 15:47.95 OT | Johnson Lee | 18 February 2008 | | Seattle, United States | |
| 60 m hurdles | 9.16 | Kenneth Karosich | 20 February 2009 | | Cedar Falls, United States | |
| High jump | 1.65 m | Jude Martinez | 7 February 2008 | | Portland, United States | |
| Pole vault | | | | | | |
| Long jump | 5.79 m | Jude Martinez | 27 February 2010 | Great West Conf Meet | Vermillion, United States | |
| Triple jump | | | | | | |
| Shot put | 14.56 m | Justin Andre | 22 January 2005 | | Marshall, United States | |
| Weight throw | 15.36 m | Justin Andre | 22 January 2005 | | Marshall, United States | |
| Heptathlon | | | | | | |
| Heptathlon | 100m H / High jump / Shot put / 200m / Long jump / Javelin / 800m | | | | | |
| 5000 m walk | | | | | | |
| 4 × 400 m relay | | | | | | |

=== Women ===
| Event | Record | Athlete | Date | Meet | Place | Ref. |
|---|---|---|---|---|---|---|
| 55 m | 7.53 | Pollara Cobb | 23 February 2013 | UAA Championships | Cleveland, United States | |
| 60 m | 7.56 | Regine Tugade | 1 March 2020 | Patriot League Championships | Bethlehem, Pennsylvania | |
| 200 m | 24.31 | Regine Tugade | 21 February 2020 | Navy Select | Annapolis, Maryland | |
| 300 m | 45.20 | Naomi Blaz | 6/7 December 2013 | Kent State Golden Flash Gala | Kent, United States | |
| 400 m | 1:00.08 | Christina Francisco | 18 March 2016 | World Championships | Portland, United States | |
| 500 m | 1:29.15 | Naomi Blaz | 17 January 2014 | Northwest Ohio Invitational | Findlay, United States | |
| 600 m | 1:49.87 | Kristi Hammond | 1 February 2014 | USM Invite II | Gorham, United States | |
| 600 m | 1:43.92 OT | Alison Bowman | 11 February 2018 | UW Open | Seattle, United States | |
| 800 m | 2:19.18 | Sloan Siegrist | 31 January 2004 | | Boston, United States | |
| 1000 m | 3:04.87 OT | Amy Atkinson | 11 February 2012 | Azusa Pacific Indoor #1 | Azusa, United States | |
| 1500 m | 4:56.74 | Sloan Siegrist | 14 January 2006 | | Medford, United States | |
| Mile | 5:02.63 | Sloan Siegrist | 20 February 2005 | | Cambridge, United States | |
| 3000 m | 9:51.76 | Sloan Siegrist | 10 February 2006 | | Boston, United States | |
| 5000 m | 17:30.32 | Debbie Cardenas | 2002 | | | |
| 60 m hurdles | | | | | | |
| 300 m hurdles | 51.10 | Naomi Blaz | 22 February 2014 | Kent State Tune-Up | Kent, United States | |
| High jump | 1.52 m | Kristi Hammond | 15 February 2014 | Tufts Cupid Challenge | Boston, United States | |
| Pole vault | 3.45 m A | Juliana Jensen | 30 March 2002 | | Reno, United States | |
| Long jump | 5.60 m | Regine Tugade | 3 February 2018 | Navy vs. Army Star Meet | Annapolis, United States | |
| Triple jump | 10.36 m | Pollara Cobb | 6 December 2013 | BSC Panther Indoor Icebreaker | Birmingham, United States | |
| Shot put | | | | | | |
| Pentathlon | | | | | | |
| Pentathlon | 60m H / High jump / Shot put / Long jump / 800m | | | | | |
| 3000 m walk | | | | | | |
| 4 × 400 m relay | | | | | | |
