= Guam at the World Athletics Championships =

- WA code: GUM
- National federation: Guam Track and Field Association
- Medals: Gold 0 Silver 0 Bronze 0 Total 0

World Athletics Championships appearances (overview)
- 1987; 1991; 1993; 1995; 1997; 1999; 2001; 2003; 2005; 2007; 2009; 2011; 2013; 2015; 2017; 2019; 2022; 2023; 2025

Guam has competed at every edition of the World Athletics Championships since 1987, bar the 2009 event. The best placings the country has had is fifth in the men's 100 metres heats by Philam Garcia and 33rd (last) in the women's marathon by Julie Ogborn in 1987.

== Performances ==
=== 1987 ===
Athlete	Event	Final	
Athlete	Event	Time	Rank
Julie Ogborn	women's marathon	3:50:56	33

=== 2005 ===
Athlete	Event	Heats		Semifinals		Final	
Athlete	Event	Time	Rank	Time	Rank	Time	Rank
Philam Garcia	men's 100 metres	10.79	39	did not advance			

=== 2007 ===
Athlete	Event	Heats		Semifinals		Final	
Athlete	Event	Time	Rank	Time	Rank	Time	Rank
Michael Alicto	men's 200 metres	22.45	45	did not advance			

=== 2011 ===
Athlete	Event	Preliminaries		Heats		Semifinals		Final	
Athlete	Event	Time	Rank	Time	Rank	Time	Rank	Time	Rank
Derek Mandell	men's 800 metres			1:57.11 PB	40	Did not advance			
Pollara Cobb	Women's 100 metres	12.64 q	18	12.55 PB	53	Did not advance			

=== 2013 ===
Athlete	Event	Preliminaries		Heats		Semifinals		Final	
Athlete	Event	Time	Rank	Time	Rank	Time	Rank	Time	Rank
Michael Alicto	men's 100 metres	11.39	22	did not advance					

=== 2015 ===
Athlete	Event	Heat		Semifinal		Final	
Athlete	Event	Result	Rank	Result	Rank	Result	Rank
Regine Tugade	women's 100 metres	12.60	51	did not advance			

=== 2017 ===
Athlete	Event	Heat		Semifinal		Final	
Athlete	Event	Result	Rank	Result	Rank	Result	Rank
Regine Tugade	women's 200 metres	26.22	46	Did not advance			
