= Guam at the 2017 World Aquatics Championships =

- Flag of Guam
- World Aquatics code: GUM
- National federation: Guam Swimming Federation
- Website: guamswimming.org

in Budapest, Hungary
- Competitors: 4 in 1 sport
- Medals: Gold 0 Silver 0 Bronze 0 Total 0

World Aquatics Championships appearances
- 1973; 1975; 1978; 1982; 1986; 1991; 1994; 1998; 2001; 2003; 2005; 2007; 2009; 2011; 2013; 2015; 2017; 2019; 2022; 2023; 2024; 2025

Guam competed at the 2017 World Aquatics Championships in Budapest, Hungary from 14 July to 30 July.

== Swimming ==
Guam has received a Universality invitation from FINA to send a maximum of four swimmers (two men and two women) to the World Championships.

Athlete	Event	Heat		Semifinal		Final	
Athlete	Event	Time	Rank	Time	Rank	Time	Rank
Tanner Poppe	Men's 100 m butterfly	1:03.28	69	did not advance			
Jagger Stephens	Men's 50 m freestyle	24.18	83	did not advance			
Jagger Stephens	Men's 100 m freestyle	52.35	69	did not advance			
Mineri Gomez	Women's 100 m freestyle	1:05.09	71	did not advance			
Mineri Gomez	Women's 100 m butterfly	1:17.47	46	did not advance			
Amanda Poppe	Women's 100 m breaststroke	1:18.24	58	did not advance			
