= Guam at the 2022 World Aquatics Championships =

- Flag of Guam
- World Aquatics code: GUM
- National federation: Guam Swimming Federation
- Website: guamswimming.org

in Budapest, Hungary
- Competitors: 4 in 1 sport
- Medals: Gold 0 Silver 0 Bronze 0 Total 0

World Aquatics Championships appearances
- 1973; 1975; 1978; 1982; 1986; 1991; 1994; 1998; 2001; 2003; 2005; 2007; 2009; 2011; 2013; 2015; 2017; 2019; 2022; 2023; 2024; 2025

Guam competed at the 2022 World Aquatics Championships in Budapest, Hungary from 17 June to 3 July.

== Swimming ==
Guam entered four swimmers.

Men

Athlete	Event	Heat		Semifinal		Final	
Athlete	Event	Time	Rank	Time	Rank	Time	Rank
Benjamin Ko	100 m freestyle	57.70	92	did not advance			
Benjamin Ko	100 m backstroke	1:02.66	45	did not advance			
Israel Poppe	200 m freestyle	2:05.00	59	did not advance			
Israel Poppe	100 m butterfly	1:02.72	62	did not advance			

Women

Athlete	Event	Heat		Semifinal		Final	
Athlete	Event	Time	Rank	Time	Rank	Time	Rank
Mia Lee	100 m freestyle	1:03.67	52	did not advance			
Mia Lee	100 m butterfly	1:13.32	29	did not advance			
Keana Santos	200 m freestyle	2:30.08	39	did not advance			
Keana Santos	400 m freestyle	5:28.52	34	—N/a		did not advance	

Mixed

Athlete	Event	Heat		Final	
Athlete	Event	Time	Rank	Time	Rank
Benjamin Ko; Mia Lee; Israel Poppe; Keana Santos	4 × 100 m freestyle relay	4:06.21	24	did not advance	
Benjamin Ko; Mia Lee; Israel Poppe; Keana Santos	4 × 100 m medley relay	4:47.10	27	did not advance	
