= Guam at the 2015 World Aquatics Championships =

- Flag of Guam
- World Aquatics code: GUM
- National federation: Guam Swimming Federation
- Website: guamswimming.org

in Kazan, Russia
- Competitors: 3 in 1 sport
- Medals: Gold 0 Silver 0 Bronze 0 Total 0

World Aquatics Championships appearances
- 1973; 1975; 1978; 1982; 1986; 1991; 1994; 1998; 2001; 2003; 2005; 2007; 2009; 2011; 2013; 2015; 2017; 2019; 2022; 2023; 2024; 2025

Guam competed at the 2015 World Aquatics Championships in Kazan, Russia from 24 July to 9 August 2015.

== Swimming ==
Guamanian swimmers have achieved qualifying standards in the following events (up to a maximum of 2 swimmers in each event at the A-standard entry time, and 1 at the B-standard):

Men

Athlete	Event	Heat		Semifinal		Final	
Athlete	Event	Time	Rank	Time	Rank	Time	Rank
Jagger Stephens	50 m freestyle	23.84	53	did not advance			
Jagger Stephens	100 m freestyle	51.50	67	did not advance			
Benjamin Schulte	100 m breaststroke	1:04.84	58	did not advance			
Benjamin Schulte	200 m individual medley	2:09.50	43	did not advance			

Women

Athlete	Event	Heat		Semifinal		Final	
Athlete	Event	Time	Rank	Time	Rank	Time	Rank
Pilar Shimizu	100 m breaststroke	1:18.11	58	did not advance			
Pilar Shimizu	200 m breaststroke	2:56.47	47	did not advance			
