= Guam at the 2023 World Athletics Championships =

- Flag of Guam
- WA code: GUM

in Budapest, Hungary 19 August 2023 – 27 August 2023
- Competitors: 1 (1 man and 0 women)
- Medals: Gold 0 Silver 0 Bronze 0 Total 0

World Athletics Championships appearances (overview)
- 1987; 1991; 1993; 1995; 1997; 1999; 2001; 2003; 2005; 2007; 2009; 2011; 2013; 2015; 2017; 2019; 2022; 2023; 2025

Guam competed at the 2023 World Athletics Championships in Budapest, Hungary, which were held from 19 to 27 August 2023. The athlete delegation of the country was composed of one competitor, sprinter Joseph Green who competed in the men's 100 metres. He qualified for the Championships upon being selected by the Guam Track and Field Association. Despite failing to advance from his preliminary round, he set a new personal best in the event and became the first Guamanian to advance from a round at the World Athletics Championships.

== Background ==
The 2023 World Athletics Championships in Budapest, Hungary, were held from 19 to 27 August 2023. The Championships were held at the National Athletics Centre. To qualify for the World Championships, athletes had to reach an entry standard (e.g. time or distance), place in a specific position at select competitions, be a wild card entry, or qualify through their World Athletics Ranking at the end of the qualification period.

As Guam did not meet any of the four standards, they could send either one male or one female athlete in one event of the Championships who has not yet qualified. The Guam Track and Field Association selected sprinter Joseph Green, who would compete in the men's 100 metres. By then, he had a personal of 10.93 seconds in the event. Before the Championships, he trained at the University of Arizona.

== Results ==
Key

- Q = Qualified for the next round
- q = Qualified for the next round as a fastest loser or, in field events, by position without achieving the qualifying target
- NR = National record
- PB = Personal best
- SB = Season best
- N/A = Round not applicable for the event

=== Men ===
Green first competed in the fourth preliminary on 19 August against six other sprinters. There, he recorded a new personal best time of 10.84 seconds and placed second, advancing further to the heats held on the same day. He competed in the seventh heat against seven other sprinters. There, he ran in a time of 10.91 seconds and placed last, failing to advance further to the semifinals as only the top three athletes of each heat and the three next fastest athletes would be selected. According to the Guam National Olympic Committee, Green's performance made him the first Guamanian to advance from a round at the World Athletics Championships.

Track and road events

Athlete	Event	Preliminary		Heat		Semifinal		Final	
Athlete	Event	Result	Rank	Result	Rank	Result	Rank	Result	Rank
Joseph Green	100 metres	10.84 PB	2 Q	10.91	8	Did not advance			
