= Guam at the 2023 World Aquatics Championships =

- Flag of Guam
- World Aquatics code: GUM
- National federation: Guam Swimming Federation
- Website: guamswimming.org

in Fukuoka, Japan
- Competitors: 4 in 1 sport
- Medals: Gold 0 Silver 0 Bronze 0 Total 0

World Aquatics Championships appearances
- 1973; 1975; 1978; 1982; 1986; 1991; 1994; 1998; 2001; 2003; 2005; 2007; 2009; 2011; 2013; 2015; 2017; 2019; 2022; 2023; 2024; 2025

Guam is set to compete at the 2023 World Aquatics Championships in Fukuoka, Japan from 14 to 30 July.

== Swimming ==
Guam entered 4 swimmers.

Men

Athlete	Event	Heat		Semifinal		Final	
Athlete	Event	Time	Rank	Time	Rank	Time	Rank
James Hendrix	100 metre butterfly	57.65	62	Did not advance			
James Hendrix	200 metre butterfly	Did not start		Did not advance			
Israel Poppe	100 metre freestyle	54.95	96	Did not advance			
Israel Poppe	200 metre freestyle	2:02.57	69	Did not advance			

Women

Athlete	Event	Heat		Semifinal		Final	
Athlete	Event	Time	Rank	Time	Rank	Time	Rank
Amaya Bollinger	400 metre freestyle	5:16.50	41	—N/a		Did not advance	
Amaya Bollinger	200 metre butterfly	2:38.22	29	Did not advance			
Mia Lee	50 metre freestyle	27.54	61	Did not advance			
Mia Lee	100 metre freestyle	1:01.69	54	Did not advance			

Mixed

Athlete	Event	Heat		Final	
Athlete	Event	Time	Rank	Time	Rank
James Hendrix; Mia Lee; Amaya Bollinger; Israel Poppe	4 × 100 m freestyle relay	3:54.54	34	Did not advance	
Israel Poppe; Amaya Bollinger; James Hendrix; Mia Lee	4 × 100 m medley relay	4:40.68	41	Did not advance	
