= Guam at the 2011 World Championships in Athletics =

- WA code: GUM
- National federation: Guam Track and Field Association
- Website: www.sportingpulse.com/assoc_page.cgi?c=2-1145-0-0-0

in Daegu
- Competitors: 2
- Medals: Gold 0 Silver 0 Bronze 0 Total 0

World Championships in Athletics appearances (overview)
- 1987; 1991; 1993; 1995; 1997; 1999; 2001; 2003; 2005; 2007; 2009; 2011; 2013; 2015; 2017; 2019; 2022; 2023; 2025

Guam competed at the 2011 World Championships in Athletics from August 27 to September 4 in Daegu, South Korea. A team of 2 athletes was announced to represent the country in the event.

In the women's 100m, Pollara Cobb advanced from the preliminaries to the heats and set a Guamanian record in the latter race with her time of 12.55 seconds.

Her record was later broken by high schooler Regine Tugade, who said that Cobb's records provided inspiration for her: "I always wanted to be like her."

== Results ==
=== Men ===
Athlete	Event	Preliminaries		Heats		Semifinals		Final	
Athlete	Event	Time Width Height	Rank	Time Width Height	Rank	Time Width Height	Rank	Time Width Height	Rank
Derek Mandell	800 metres			1:57.11 PB	40	Did not advance			

=== Women ===
Athlete	Event	Preliminaries		Heats		Semifinals		Final	
Athlete	Event	Time Width Height	Rank	Time Width Height	Rank	Time Width Height	Rank	Time Width Height	Rank
Pollara Cobb	100 metres	12.64 q	18	12.55 NR	53	Did not advance			
