= Guam at the 2017 World Championships in Athletics =

- Flag of Guam
- WA code: GUM
- National federation: Guam Track and Field Association
- Website: Official website

in London, United Kingdom 4–13 August 2017
- Competitors: 1 (1 woman) in 1 event
- Medals: Gold 0 Silver 0 Bronze 0 Total 0

World Championships in Athletics appearances (overview)
- 1987; 1991; 1993; 1995; 1997; 1999; 2001; 2003; 2005; 2007; 2009; 2011; 2013; 2015; 2017; 2019; 2022; 2023; 2025

Guam competed at the 2017 World Championships in Athletics in London, United Kingdom, from 4–13 August 2017.

Following her run in the 100m at the Guam at the 2017 World Championships in Athletics, Guamanian record holder Regine Tugade was selected to run in the 200m at the 2017 edition of the meet. She had hoped to redeem herself at the 2017 Worlds, not having improved upon her 12.26 100m national record in two years of competition since. She said of the meet, "I am really looking forward to competing in London. My last competition was a few months ago in Fiji for the Oceania Championships, I wasn't too happy with my performance but since then I've been back home. This summer is my first time home since March for my spring break. I've been trying to practice swimming because I need to pass my swim class."

She ran 26.22 seconds into a 0.4 meters per second headwind in the heats, which placed her 46th overall and did not advance her to the semifinals. She was accompanied by Toea Wisil of Papua New Guinea, who was the only other Oceania competitor in the 200m running 23.93 seconds in her heat.

== Results ==
=== Women ===
Track and road events

Athlete	Event	Heat		Semifinal		Final	
Athlete	Event	Result	Rank	Result	Rank	Result	Rank
Regine Tugade	200 metres	26.22	46	Did not advance			
