= Guam at the 2019 World Aquatics Championships =

- Flag of Guam
- World Aquatics code: GUM
- National federation: Guam Swimming Federation
- Website: guamswimming.org

in Gwangju, South Korea
- Medals: Gold 0 Silver 0 Bronze 0 Total 0

World Aquatics Championships appearances
- 1973; 1975; 1978; 1982; 1986; 1991; 1994; 1998; 2001; 2003; 2005; 2007; 2009; 2011; 2013; 2015; 2017; 2019; 2022; 2023; 2024; 2025

Guam competed at the 2019 World Aquatics Championships in Gwangju, South Korea from 12 to 28 July.

== Swimming ==
Guam entered three swimmers.

Men

Athlete	Event	Heat		Semifinal		Final	
Athlete	Event	Time	Rank	Time	Rank	Time	Rank
Benjamin Schulte	50 m breaststroke	28.73	46	did not advance			
Benjamin Schulte	100 m breaststroke	1:04.40	61	did not advance			
Jagger Stephens	50 m freestyle	24.45	83	did not advance			
Jagger Stephens	100 m freestyle	52.53	80	did not advance			

Women

Athlete	Event	Heat		Semifinal		Final	
Athlete	Event	Time	Rank	Time	Rank	Time	Rank
Mineri Gomez	100 m freestyle	1:05.11	79	did not advance			
Mineri Gomez	200 m freestyle	2:23.73	58	did not advance			
