= Guam at the 2024 World Aquatics Championships =

- Flag of Guam
- FINA code: GUM
- National federation: Guam Swimming Federation
- Website: guamswimming.org

in Doha, Qatar
- Competitors: 4 in 1 sport
- Medals: Gold 0 Silver 0 Bronze 0 Total 0

World Aquatics Championships appearances
- 1973; 1975; 1978; 1982; 1986; 1991; 1994; 1998; 2001; 2003; 2005; 2007; 2009; 2011; 2013; 2015; 2017; 2019; 2022; 2023; 2024

Guam is set to compete at the 2024 World Aquatics Championships in Doha, Qatar from 2 to 18 February.

== Swimming ==
Guam entered 4 swimmers.

Men

Athlete	Event	Heat		Semifinal		Final	
Athlete	Event	Time	Rank	Time	Rank	Time	Rank
James Hendrix	100 metre freestyle	55.03	84	Did not advance			
James Hendrix	100 metre butterfly	59.01	57	Did not advance			
Israel Poppe	200 metre freestyle	2:02.60	64	Did not advance			
Israel Poppe	100 metre backstroke	1:02.83	52	Did not advance			

Women

Athlete	Event	Heat		Semifinal		Final	
Athlete	Event	Time	Rank	Time	Rank	Time	Rank
Amaya Bollinger	100 metre butterfly	1:08.15	40	Did not advance			
Amaya Bollinger	200 metre butterfly	2:38.33	25	Did not advance			
Mia Lee	100 metre freestyle	1:01.22	50	Did not advance			
Mia Lee	200 metre freestyle	2:18.01	47	Did not advance			

Mixed

Athlete	Event	Heat		Final	
Athlete	Event	Time	Rank	Time	Rank
James Hendrix; Israel Poppe; Amaya Bollinger; Mia Lee	4 × 100 m freestyle relay	3:52.29 NR	16	Did not advance	
James Hendrix; Israel Poppe; Amaya Bollinger; Mia Lee	4 × 100 m medley relay	4:30.74 NR	31	Did not advance	
