= Tugade =

Tugade is a Pangasinan-language surname. Notable people with the surname include:

- Arthur Tugade (born 1946), Filipino businessman and lawyer
- Lordy Tugade (born 1977), Filipino basketball player
- Regine Tugade (born 1998), Guamanian sprinter
- Ruby Rosselle "Ross" Tugade (born 1990), Filipino international lawyer
