= Guam at the 2013 World Championships in Athletics =

- WA code: GUM

in Moscow
- Competitors: 1
- Medals: Gold 0 Silver 0 Bronze 0 Total 0

World Championships in Athletics appearances (overview)
- 1987; 1991; 1993; 1995; 1997; 1999; 2001; 2003; 2005; 2007; 2009; 2011; 2013; 2015; 2017; 2019; 2022; 2023; 2025

Guam competed at the 2013 World Championships in Athletics in Moscow, Russia, from 10–18 August 2013. A team of one athlete was announced to represent the country in the event.

Earlier in the season, Michael Alicto had won the 100m at the Guam National Championships by over half a second with a time of 11.13 seconds, in addition to taking home gold in the 200m and silver in the long jump which earned him the nation's only berth to the 2013 World Championships.

At the World Championships, Alicto finished sixth in his preliminary heat with a time of 11.39 seconds, which did not advance him to the next round.

Though Alicto has not competed in another global championship since, he was able to leverage the experience to help other athletes. In 2014, Guamanian sprinter Raquel Walker credited Alicto's advice for helping her progress towards her pursuit of Pollara Cobb's 100m record set at the previous Worlds, saying "Ever since I’ve been training with (Alicto) I’ve been feeling really good, my speed’s been getting better, and hopefully by the end of the season you’ll see something awesome."

== Results ==
(q – qualified, NM – no mark, SB – season best)

=== Men ===
Athlete	Event	Preliminaries		Heats		Semifinals		Final	
Athlete	Event	Time	Rank	Time	Rank	Time	Rank	Time	Rank
Michael Alicto	100 metres	11.39	22	did not advance					
