= Guam at the 2026 Summer Youth Olympics =

- Flag of Guam
- IOC code: GUM
- NOC: Guam National Olympic Committee
- Website: www.oceaniasport.com/guam/

in Dakar, Senegal October 31, 2026 – November 13, 2026
- Competitors: 5 in 3 sports
- Flag bearers: Alessandra Leon & Ocean Campus
- Medals: Gold 0 Silver 0 Bronze 0 Total 0

Summer Youth Olympics appearances
- 2010; 2014; 2018; 2026

Guam is scheduled to compete at the 2026 Summer Youth Olympics in Dakar, Senegal from October 31 to November 13, 2026. This will mark Guam's fourth appearance at the Youth Olympics, after making its debut in 2010.

Beach volleyball player Alessandra Leon and swimmer Ocean Campus served as the flag bearers for the opening ceremony.

== Competitors ==
The following is the list of number of competitors participating at the Games per sport/discipline.

Sport	Men	Women	Total
Athletics	1	1	2
Beach volleyball	2	0	2
Swimming	1	0	1
Total	4	1	5

== Athletics ==
Guam entered two athletes, one male and one female.

Athlete	Event	Final	
Athlete	Event	Distance	Rank
Alonzo Acosta	Men's hammer throw		
Lana Quinata	Women's shot put		

== Beach volleyball ==
Guam received a quota place for the women's tournament.

Summary

Team	Event	Group stage				Round of 16	Quarterfinals	Semifinals	Final / PG / BM	
Team	Event	Opposition Result	Opposition Result	Opposition Result	Rank	Opposition Result	Opposition Result	Opposition Result	Opposition Result	Rank
Erica Cassidy; Alessandra Leon	Women's tournament	Assucena / Celia (MOZ)	I García / Frascaroli (ARG)	Mir / Berthaudeau (FRA)						

== Swimming ==
Guam entered one male swimmer.

Athlete	Event	Heat		Final	
Athlete	Event	Time	Rank	Time	Rank
Ocean Campus	Men's 50 m freestyle				
Ocean Campus	Men's 100 m freestyle				
Ocean Campus	Men's 200 m freestyle				
Ocean Campus	Men's 200 m individual medley				
