= Taekwondo at the 2026 Summer Youth Olympics – Men's 48 kg =

Men's 48 kg at the IV Summer Youth Olympic Games
- Venue: Complexe Iba Mar Diop
- Date: 9 November
- Competitors: 9 from 9 nations

Medalists
1st place, gold medalist(s)		Youssef Hassan Kamal	Egypt
2nd place, silver medalist(s)		Maxence Botta	France
3rd place, bronze medalist(s)		Abdellatif Ladimat	Morocco
3rd place, bronze medalist(s)		Dmitrii Balagula	Moldova

The men's' 48 kg competition at the 2026 Summer Youth Olympics was held on 9 November at the Complexe Iba Mar Diop.

== Schedule ==
All times are local (UTC+0).

Date	Time	Round
Monday, 9 November 2026	11:36; 12:00; 17:15; 18:15	Round of 16; Quarterfinals; Semifinals; Final

== Bracket ==
Round of 16
Ashen Punchihewa (SRI)	3	9
Cedric Guzmán (HON)	7	10

Quarterfinals
Zayed Al-Balushi (OMA)
Abdellatif Ladimat (MAR)	WDQ
Maxence Botta (FRA)	15	13
Loann Dzukou Kamsu (CMR)	0	2
Sifen Gashaw (ETH)	7	11
Dmitrii Balagula (MDA)	15	12
Cedric Guzmán (HON)	7	0
Youssef Hassan Kamal (EGY)	17	17

Semifinals
Abdellatif Ladimat (MAR)	3	20	16
Maxence Botta (FRA)	14	9	16
Dmitrii Balagula (MDA)	0	8
Youssef Hassan Kamal (EGY)	10	18

Final
Maxence Botta (FRA)	2	5
Youssef Hassan Kamal (EGY)	2	6
