= Athletics at the 2026 Summer Youth Olympics – Men's 1500 metres =

Athletics event at the 2026 Summer Youth Olympics

Men's 1500 metres at the IV Summer Youth Olympic Games
- Venue: Complexe Iba Mar Diop
- Date: 9 November 2026
- Competitors: 11 from 11 nations
- Winning time: 3:58.73

Medalists
1st place, gold medalist(s)		Wabi Seblega	Ethiopia
2nd place, silver medalist(s)		Lahiru Achintha Gallage	Sri Lanka
3rd place, bronze medalist(s)		Alex Sangil	Spain

The men's 1500 metres event at the 2026 Summer Youth Olympics was held on 9 November at the Complexe Iba Mar Diop in Dakar, Senegal. The event was contested as a single final, with Ethiopia's Wabi Seblega winning the gold medal in 3:58.73.

== Schedule ==
The official athletics schedule listed the men's 1500 metres final for 9 November 2026 at 16:28 local time (UTC).

Date	Time	Round
9 November 2026	16:28	Final

== Results ==
=== Final ===
The men's 1500 metres was contested in a single final, as specified in the official athletics competition format for the event.

The final was held on 9 November 2026 at 16:28. Wabi Seblega won in 3:58.73, with Lahiru Achintha Gallage finishing second and Alex Sangil third.

Rank	Bib	Athlete	Nation	Result	Remark
1st place, gold medalist(s)	365	Wabi Seblega	Ethiopia	3:58.73	PB
2nd place, silver medalist(s)	463	Lahiru Achintha Gallage	Sri Lanka	3:59.08	
3rd place, bronze medalist(s)	359	Alex Sangil	Spain	3:59.70	
4	418	Enrique de Jesus Ramírez Ramírez	Mexico	4:00.29	
5	464	David Okumang	South Sudan	4:02.45	PB
6	312	Justin Nihimbazwe	Burundi	4:02.77	PB
7	445	Samuel Rodrigues	Portugal	4:07.39	
8	394	Qusai Al-Ramadin	Jordan	4:09.02	PB
9	378	Ho Chun Au	Hong Kong	4:09.68	
10	446	Chrisjan Estévez	Puerto Rico	4:09.94	
11	305	Eden Antersyn	Aruba	4:11.59	PB
