= Guam at the 2015 World Championships in Athletics =

- WA code: GUM

in Beijing
- Competitors: 1
- Medals: Gold 0 Silver 0 Bronze 0 Total 0

World Championships in Athletics appearances (overview)
- 1987; 1991; 1993; 1995; 1997; 1999; 2001; 2003; 2005; 2007; 2009; 2011; 2013; 2015; 2017; 2019; 2022; 2023; 2025

Guam competed at the 2015 World Championships in Athletics in Beijing, China, from 22 to 30 August 2015. Guamanian national record holder Regine Tugade, a high school senior at the time, was the only athlete to compete, her only event the women's 100m. Understanding that she would be the only Guamanian athlete, as had been the case at the 2015 World Youth Championships weeks before, she stated her goal was just to set a personal record. Having no suitable partners, Tugade largely trained alone, arriving at the track at 5:30 a.m. on weekdays before her classes started to prepare for the competition and training with the Guam Central Athletics Club after end of term. Tugade traveled with a larger Oceania team to the Games, sponsored by the Guam Track & Field Association. Though she qualified for both the 100m and 200m in the earlier World Youth Games, her 200m sprint time was "far from qualifying" in the senior championships, so she decided split the events, taking part in the 200m at World Youths and saving the 100m for senior Worlds.

Finishing in sixth place in the fifth heat, Tugade failed to qualify for the semifinals, a time of 12.60 seconds placing her 51st overall. Though the time was 0.34 seconds off her own PB and national record, it was only 0.05 seconds off Polara Cobb's previous national record in this event set at the same race four years ago.

Tugade's decision to run the World Championships rather than the more regional Pacific Games in Papua New Guinea that year was questioned. Rationalizing her decision, she stated that "[i]t was a late notice...if I wanted to go I would have to raise $2000 on my own." Despite an uncompetitive finish, Tugade's run was her only global senior championship before being recruited for the U.S. Naval Academy in Annapolis, Maryland to run track and field. Following her decision, Guam Delegate Madeleine Bordallo stated that "[Tugade] has made Guam proud in international sports competitions."

== Results ==
(q – qualified, NM – no mark, SB – season best)

=== Women ===
Track and road events

Athlete	Event	Heat		Semifinal		Final	
Athlete	Event	Result	Rank	Result	Rank	Result	Rank
Regine Tugade	100 metres	12.60	51	did not advance			
