= Athletics at the 2026 Summer Youth Olympics – Women's shot put =

Women's shot put athletics event at the 2026 Summer Youth Olympics

Women's shot put at the IV Summer Youth Olympic Games
- Venue: Complexe Iba Mar Diop
- Date: 10 November
- Competitors: 7 from 7 nations
- Winning time: 16.47 m

Medalists
1st place, gold medalist(s)		Zsofi Marton	Hungary
2nd place, silver medalist(s)		Zara Veltruski	Croatia
3rd place, bronze medalist(s)		Alaa Belal	Egypt

The women's shot put event at the 2026 Summer Youth Olympics was held on 10 November 2026 at the Complexe Iba Mar Diop in Dakar, Senegal.

== Schedule ==
All times are in local time (UTC+0).

Date	Time	Round
10 November 2026	14:06	Final

== Results ==
=== Final ===
The final was held on 10 November 2026, from 14:06 to 14:45.

Rank	Bib	Athlete	Nation	1	2	3	4	5	6	Result	Remark
1st place, gold medalist(s)	180	Zsofi Marton	Hungary	16.47	16.34	15.74	16.45	16.36	16.31	16.47	
2nd place, silver medalist(s)	138	Zara Veltruski	Croatia	15.85	16.10	15.36	15.04	x	16.12	16.12	
3rd place, bronze medalist(s)	147	Alaa Belal	Egypt	x	15.47	x	x	15.92	x	15.92	
4	234	Kinga Jackowska	Poland	15.68	14.52	13.59	14.75	13.12	15.28	15.68	
5	160	Diana Vanamb	Estonia	13.67	14.23	13.77	13.88	13.54	14.45	14.45	
6	177	Lana Quinata	Guam	11.34	10.80	11.50	10.68	11.01	11.30	11.50	PB
7	114	Melody Gabourel	Belize	x	9.84	9.47	8.97	9.37	9.61	9.84	PB
