= Ashley Spencer (hurdler) =

American sprinter (born 1993)

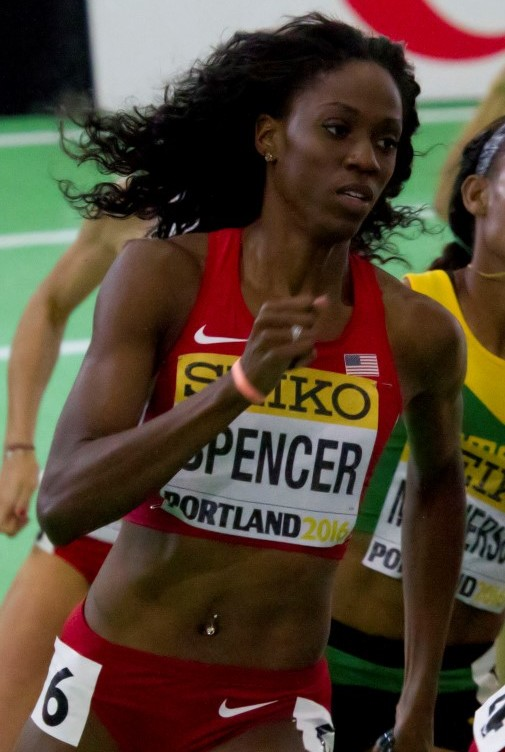

Personal information
- Born: June 8, 1993 (age 33)
- Height: 5 ft 10 in (1.78 m)
- Weight: 128 lb (58 kg)

Sport
- Country: United States
- Sport: Track and field
- Event: 400 m hurdles
Medal record
Olympic Games
Bronze medal – third place	2016 Rio de Janeiro	400 m hurdles
World Championships
Gold medal – first place	2013 Moscow	4 × 400 m relay
World Indoor Championships
Gold medal – first place	2016 Portland	4 × 400 m relay
Silver medal – second place	2016 Portland	400 m
World Relay Championships
Gold medal – first place	2017 Nassau	4 × 400 m relay
World Junior Championships
Gold medal – first place	2012 Barcelona	400 m
Gold medal – first place	2012 Barcelona	4 × 400 m relay

Ashley Spencer (born June 8, 1993) is an American track and field athlete who competes in the 400 metres and the 400 metres hurdles. In the 400 m hurdles, she is the 2016 Olympic bronze medalist. In the 400 m, she is the 2012 World Junior Champion and the 2016 World Indoor silver medalist. She is coached by 1996 Olympic bronze medalist Tonya Buford-Bailey.

== Early life ==
Born June 8, 1993, in Indianapolis, Indiana, Spencer attended the University of Illinois at Urbana–Champaign, where she ran for the Illinois Fighting Illini and won 2 NCAA titles. She then attended the University of Texas at Austin, where she ran for the Texas Longhorns. Her uncle is Steve Smith, the 1995 Pan American Games silver medalist in the high jump.

== International career ==
At the 2012 World Junior Championships Spencer won gold medals in both the 400 meters and the 4 × 400 meter relay.

At the 2013 USA Outdoor Track and Field Championships Spencer finished third in the 400 m. This finish assured her selection for the 2013 World Championships in Moscow. At the World Championships she ran 51.48 in the 400 m heats to qualify for the semifinals, where she was eliminated running 51.80. She went on to win a gold medal in the 4 × 400 m relay, along with Jessica Beard, Natasha Hastings and Francena McCorory.

Spencer won a silver medal in the 400 m in 51.77 and a gold medal in the 4 × 400 m relay at the 2016 IAAF World Indoor Championships in Portland, Oregon. Later that year at the United States Olympic Trials, she finished second behind Dalilah Muhammad in the 400 m hurdles in a personal best of 54.02, to earn selection for the Rio Olympics. She also finished seventh in the 400 m final at the trials in 51.09. At the Rio Olympics, she won the bronze medal in the 400 m hurdles in a personal best time of 53.72 seconds.

In June 2017, Spencer moved into the world all-time top 25 when she improved her 400 m hurdles best to 53.11 seconds, finishing fourth at the U.S. Championships, in a race won by Dalilah Muhammad in 52.64.
