= Athletics at the 2026 Summer Youth Olympics – Men's hammer throw =

Athletics event at the IV Summer Youth Olympic Games

Men's hammer throw at the IV Summer Youth Olympic Games
- Youth Olympic Athletics
- Venue: Stade Iba Mar Diop
- Date: 8 October 2026
- Competitors: 8 from 8 nations

Medalists
1st place, gold medalist(s)		Patry Iván Valdez; Ecuador
2nd place, silver medalist(s)		John-Pierre Theron; South Africa
3rd place, bronze medalist(s)		Mohamed Ismail; Egypt

The men's hammer throw competition at the 2026 Summer Youth Olympics was held on 8 October, at the Stade Iba Mar Diop.

== Schedule ==
All times are in local time (UTC±0).

Date	Time	Round
Sunday, 8 November 2026	14:00	Final

== Final ==
Rank	Athlete	Nation	1	2	3	4	5	6	Result	Note
1st place, gold medalist(s)	Patry Iván Valdez	Ecuador	73.27	x	71.88	71.96	72.42	69.12	73.27	
2nd place, silver medalist(s)	John-Pierre Theron	South Africa	67.72	71.79	70.54	x	71.07	66.80	71.79	
3rd place, bronze medalist(s)	Mohamed Ismail	Egypt	x	x	68.30	x	69.72	x	69.72	
4	Petros Kassavitas	Greece	63.68	63.91	x	x	64.58	65.29	65.29	
5	José Antonio Escobar	Brazil	60.86	x	x	x	x	63.30	63.30	
6	Imad Eddine Khedim	Algeria	47.49	48.91	49.79	x	49.23	x	49.79	
7	Saw Taw Blu Moo	Myanmar	39.98	x	39.75	x	x	x	39.98	PB
8	Alonzo Acosta	Guam	36.15	37.37	37.52	x	37.98	x	37.98	PB
