= Sri Lanka at the 2026 Summer Youth Olympics =

- Flag of Sri Lanka
- IOC code: SRI
- NOC: National Olympic Committee of Sri Lanka
- Website: www.olympic.lk

in Dakar, Senegal October 31, 2026 – November 13, 2026
- Competitors: 5 in 4 sports
- Flag bearers: Tarek Bluck & Julie Hope
- Medals: Gold 0 Silver 1 Bronze 0 Total 1

Summer Youth Olympics appearances
- 2010; 2014; 2018; 2026

Sri Lanka competed at the 2026 Summer Youth Olympics in Dakar, Senegal from October 31 to November 13, 2026. This marked Sri Lanka's fourth appearance at the Youth Olympics, after making its debut in 2010.

The Sri Lankan team consisted of five athletes (three men and two women) competing in four sports. Swimmers Tarek Bluck and Julie Hope were the country's opening ceremony flagbearers.

The Sri Lankan team won one silver medal, marking the country's best ever performance at the Youth Olympics.

== Competitors ==
The following is the list of number of competitors participating at the Games per sport/discipline.

Sport	Men	Women	Total
Athletics	1	0	1
Badminton	0	1	1
Swimming	1	1	2
Taekwondo	1	0	1
Total	3	2	5

== Medallists ==
The following Sri Lankan competitors won medals at the games. In the by discipline sections below, medallists' names are bolded.

Medal	Name(s)	Sport	Event	Date	Ref.
Silver	Lahiru Achintha Gallage	Athletics	Men's 1500 metres	9 November	

== Athletics ==
Sri Lanka entered one male athlete.

=== Track event ===
Men

Athlete	Event	Final	
Athlete	Event	Result	Rank
**Lahiru Achintha Gallage**	1500 m	3:59.08	2nd place, silver medalist(s)

== Badminton ==
Sri Lanka entered one female athlete.

Athlete	Event	Group stage				Elimination	Quarterfinal	Semifinal	Final / BM	
Athlete	Event	Opposition Score	Opposition Score	Opposition Score	Rank	Opposition Score	Opposition Score	Opposition Score	Opposition Score	Rank
Nethmi Ratnayake	Women's singles	Watanabe (JPN); **L** 0–2 (10–21, 10–21)	Hong (MRI); **W** 2–0 (21–15, 21–17)	Ayudis (INA); **L** 1–2 (18–21, 20–22, 15–21)	3	Did not advance				

== Swimming ==
Sri Lanka entered two swimmers, one per gender.

Athlete	Event	Heat		Final	
Athlete	Event	Time	Rank	Time	Rank
Tarek Bluck	50 m freestyle	24.54	16	Did not advance	
Tarek Bluck	100 m freestyle	52.36	12	Did not advance	
Tarek Bluck	200 m freestyle	1:56.94	21	Did not advance	
Julie Hope	50 m freestyle	29.06	42	Did not advance	
Julie Hope	50 m backstroke	31.86	26	Did not advance	
Julie Hope	100 m backstroke	1:09.32	19	Did not advance	

== Taekwondo ==
Sri Lanka entered one male athlete.

Men

Athlete	Event	Round of 16	Quarterfinals	Semifinals	Final / BM	
Athlete	Event	Opposition Result	Opposition Result	Opposition Result	Opposition Result	Rank
Ashen Punchihewa	48 kg	Maradiaga (HON); **L** 0–2 (3–7, 9–15)	Did not advance			

== See also ==
- Sri Lanka at the 2026 Asian Beach Games
- Sri Lanka at the 2026 Commonwealth Games
- Sri Lanka at the 2026 Asian Games
