= Barbados at the 2013 World Championships in Athletics =

- WA code: BAR
- National federation: Athletics Association of Barbados
- Website: www.aabarbados.com

in Moscow
- Competitors: 9
- Medals: Gold 0 Silver 0 Bronze 0 Total 0

World Championships in Athletics appearances
- 1983; 1987; 1991; 1993; 1995; 1997; 1999; 2001; 2003; 2005; 2007; 2009; 2011; 2013; 2015; 2017; 2019; 2022; 2023

Barbados competed at the 2013 World Championships in Athletics in Moscow, Russia, from 10–18 August 2013. A team of 9 athletes was announced to represent the country in the event.

== Results ==
(q – qualified, NM – no mark, SB – season best)

=== Men ===
Athlete	Event	Preliminaries		Heats		Semifinals		Final	
Athlete	Event	Time	Rank	Time	Rank	Time	Rank	Time	Rank
Ramon Gittens	100 metres			10.19	19 Q	10.31	21	did not advance	
Andrew Hinds	100 metres			10.38	=37	did not advance			
Ryan Brathwaite	110 metres hurdles			13.40	11 Q	13.64	14	did not advance	
Greggmar Swift	110 metres hurdles			13.79	27	did not advance			
Shane Brathwaite; Levi Cadogan; Ackeem Forde; Ramon Gittens; Andrew Hinds	4 × 100 metres relay								

=== Women ===
Athlete	Event	Preliminaries		Heats		Semifinals		Final	
Athlete	Event	Time	Rank	Time	Rank	Time	Rank	Time	Rank
Sade Sealy	400 metres			55.45	34	did not advance			
Kierre Beckles	100 metres hurdles			13.47	31	did not advance			
