= Sloan Siegrist =

American-Guamanian athlete

Personal information
- Nationality: American-Guamanian
- Born: Mary Sloan Siegrist; 24 September 1980 (age 45) United States

Sport
- Sport: Middle-distance running
- Event: 1500 metres
- Club: Greater Boston Track Club, USA

Sloan Siegrist (born 24 September 1980) is an American-Guamanian middle-distance runner. She competed in the women's 1500 metres at the 2004 Summer Olympics.
