= David Wilson (sprinter) =

Guamanian sprinter

Personal information
- Nationality: Guam
- Born: 30 October 1977 (age 48)

Sport
- Sport: Sprinting
- Event: 200 metres

David Wilson (born 30 October 1977) is a Guam sprinter. He competed in the men's 200 metres at the 1996 Summer Olympics.
