= 2016 IAAF World Indoor Championships – Women's 400 metres =

Women's 400 metres at the 2016 IAAF World Indoor Championships
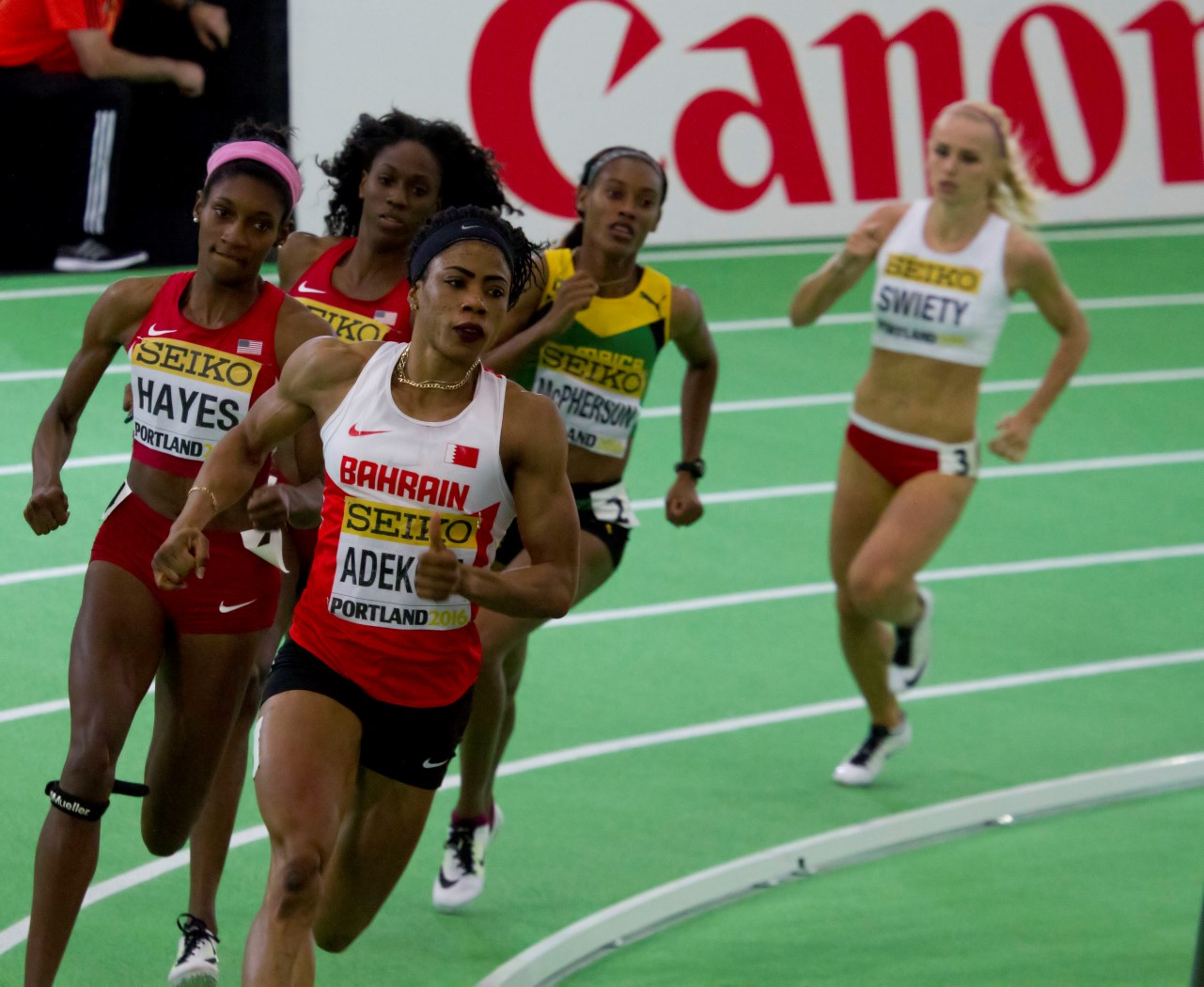
- Venue: Oregon Convention Center
- Dates: March 18 (heats, semifinals); March 19 (final)
- Competitors: 18 from 15 nations
- Winning time: 51.45

Medalists
gold medal	Oluwakemi Adekoya	Bahrain
silver medal	Ashley Spencer	United States
bronze medal	Quanera Hayes	United States

Video on YouTube Official Video

The women's 400 metres at the 2016 IAAF World Indoor Championships took place on March 18 and 19, 2016.

Nigerian born Oluwakemi Adekoya, a mercenary runner for Bahrain, came into these championships as only the seventh fastest in the world this year, but she made her mark with the fastest times in each round. In the final, she was about even with Quanera Hayes at the break, but as Hayes broke for lane 1, Adekoya made a beeline for the apex of the next turn, effectively closing the door and relegating Hayes and the rest of the field to run behind her. Hayes gathered herself and made one big push coming around the final turn, but Adekoya was able to hold her off. Hayes tried again coming off the turn but couldn't make any progress. As Hayes strained for the finish, she made a second strategic mistake and allowed Ashley Spencer to pass on her inside, Spencer pipping her for the silver medal at the line.

== Records ==
Standing records prior to the 2016 IAAF World Indoor Championships
World record	Jarmila Kratochvílová (TCH)	49.59	Milan, Italy	7 March 1982
Championship record	Olesya Forsheva (RUS)	50.04	Moscow, Russia	12 March 2006
World Leading	Courtney Okolo (USA)	50.69	Birmingham, United States	12 March 2016
African record	Charity Opara (NGR)	50.73	Stuttgart, Germany	1 February 1998
Asian record	Oluwakemi Adekoya (BHR)	51.67	Doha, Qatar	20 February 2016
European record	Jarmila Kratochvílová (TCH)	49.59	Milan, Italy	7 March 1982
North and Central American and Caribbean record	Christine Amertil (BAH)	50.34	Moscow, Russia	12 March 2006
Oceanian Record	Maree Holland (AUS)	52.17	Budapest, Hungary	4 March 1989
South American record	Aliann Pompey (GUY)	51.83	New York City, United States	26 February 2010

== Qualification standards ==
Indoor	Outdoor
53.15	51.20

== Schedule ==
Date	Time	Round
18 March 2016	12:25	Heats
18 March 2016	19:25	Semifinals
19 March 2016	18:47	Final

== Results ==
=== Heats ===
Qualification: First 2 (Q) and next 4 fastest (q) qualified for the semifinals.

Rank	Heat	Name	Nationality	Time	Notes
1	1	Oluwakemi Adekoya	Bahrain	52.27	Q
2	1	Stephenie Ann McPherson	Jamaica	52.56	Q
3	1	Kabange Mupopo	Zambia	52.72	q NR
4	2	Ashley Spencer	United States	52.96	Q
5	4	Quanera Hayes	United States	52.98	Q
6	4	Małgorzata Hołub	Poland	53.15	Q
7	2	Lisanne de Witte	Netherlands	53.19	Q
8	4	Bianca Răzor	Romania	53.27	q
9	1	Samantha Edwards	Antigua and Barbuda	53.70	q
10	2	Grace Claxton	Puerto Rico	53.97	q
11	3	Justyna Święty	Poland	54.25	Q
12	3	Iveta Putalová	Slovakia	54.53	Q
13	3	Ashley Kelly	British Virgin Islands	54.95	
14	1	Amaliya Sharoyan	Armenia	55.13	SB
15	4	Djénébou Danté	Mali	55.76	NR
16	2	Christina Francisco	Guam	1:00.08	NR
	3	Chrisann Gordon	Jamaica	DNF	
	4	Tjipekapora Herunga	Namibia	DQ	R163.3(b)
	2	Hindi Abdiqadir Abdi	Somalia	DNS	

=== Semifinals ===
Qualification: First 3 (Q) qualified directly for the final.

Rank	Heat	Name	Nationality	Time	Notes
1	2	Oluwakemi Adekoya	Bahrain	51.47	Q, AR
2	2	Quanera Hayes	United States	51.54	Q
3	2	Stephenie Ann McPherson	Jamaica	51.91	Q, SB
4	1	Ashley Spencer	United States	52.39	Q
5	2	Kabange Mupopo	Zambia	52.68	NR
6	2	Małgorzata Hołub	Poland	52.73	SB
7	1	Justyna Święty	Poland	53.00	Q
8	1	Iveta Putalová	Slovakia	53.13	Q, SB
9	1	Bianca Răzor	Romania	53.34	
10	1	Lisanne de Witte	Netherlands	53.35	
11	2	Grace Claxton	Puerto Rico	53.67	
12	1	Samantha Edwards	Antigua and Barbuda	54.67	

=== Final ===
The final was started on March 19 at 18:47.

Rank	Lane	Name	Nationality	Time	Notes
1st place, gold medalist(s)	5	Oluwakemi Adekoya	Bahrain	51.45	AR
2nd place, silver medalist(s)	6	Ashley Spencer	United States	51.72	
3rd place, bronze medalist(s)	4	Quanera Hayes	United States	51.76	
4	2	Stephenie Ann McPherson	Jamaica	52.20	
5	3	Justyna Święty	Poland	52.46	
6	1	Iveta Putalová	Slovakia	54.39	
