= Christina Francisco =

American sprinter (born 1997)

Christina Francisco is a sprinter that represents Guam internationally.

== College career ==
Francisco competed for the Portland Pilots. At the 2016 MPSF championships, she set a national record of 59.49 in the 400 meters becoming the first female runner from Guam to run that even under one minute.

== International career ==
Based on a points system, she scored high enough to be Guam's lone representative at the 2016 IAAF World Indoor Championships. In the 400 meters she finished last in her heat, running on her 19th birthday.
