= Julie Ogborn =

Guamanian long-distance runner

Personal information
- Nationality: Guam
- Born: 1 August 1958 (age 67)

Sport
- Sport: Long-distance running
- Event: Marathon

Julie Ogborn (born 1 August 1958) is a Guam long-distance runner. She competed in the women's marathon at the 1988 Summer Olympics.
