= Michael Alicto =

Guam sprinter (born 1982)

Personal information
- Nationality: Guam
- Born: 28 August 1982 (age 43)

Sport
- Sport: Track and field
- Event: 100m
Medal record
Athletics
Representing Guam
Micronesian Games
Bronze medal – third place	2006 Saipan	Long jump

Michael Alicto (born 28 August 1982) is a sprinter who represents Guam. He competed in the 100 metres event at the 2013 World Championships in Athletics.

== Competition record ==
Year	Competition	Venue	Position	Event	Notes
Representing Guam
2006	Micronesian Games	Susupe, Saipan, Northern Mariana Islands	5th	100m	11.58 (wind: -0.3 m/s)
2006	Micronesian Games	Susupe, Saipan, Northern Mariana Islands	4th	200m	23.50 (wind: 0.0 m/s)
2006	Micronesian Games	Susupe, Saipan, Northern Mariana Islands	3rd	Long jump	6.20m (NWI)
2006	Oceania Championships	Apia, Samoa	20th (sf)	100m	11.46 (wind: -0.6 m/s)
2006	Oceania Championships	Apia, Samoa	7th	Long jump	6.27m (NWI)
2006	Oceania Championships	Apia, Samoa	6th	Mixed distance medley relay	1:50.0 (ht)
2007	World Championships	Osaka, Japan	45th (h)	200m	22.45 (wind: 0.0 m/s)
2007	Pacific Games	Apia, Samoa	22nd (h)	100m	11.39 (wind: +0.6 m/s)
2007	Pacific Games	Apia, Samoa	8th	Long jump	6.39m (wind: +1.0 m/s)
2007	Micronesian Championships	Mannengon Hills, Guam	6th	60m	7.35
2007	Micronesian Championships	Mannengon Hills, Guam	18th (h)	100m	12.35
2007	Micronesian Championships	Mannengon Hills, Guam	4th	Long jump	5.74m
2007	Micronesian Championships	Mannengon Hills, Guam	6th	Javelin	34.06m
2008	World Indoor Championships	Valencia, Spain	49th (h)	60 m	7.27
2008	Oceania Championships	Saipan, Northern Mariana Islands	16th (h)	200m	23.75 (wind: -1.9 m/s)
2008	Oceania Championships	Saipan, Northern Mariana Islands	7th	Long jump	6.33m (wind: +0.3 m/s)
2008	Oceania Championships	Saipan, Northern Mariana Islands	7th	4 × 100 m relay	44.91
2013	Oceania Championships	Papeete, French Polynesia	16th (h)	100m	11.54 (wind: -0.9 m/s)
2013	Oceania Championships	Papeete, French Polynesia	13th (h)	200m	23.93 (wind: -1.0 m/s)
2013	Oceania Championships	Papeete, French Polynesia	5th	Mixed 800m sprint medley relay	1:49.21
2013	World Championships	Moscow, Russia	67th (pr)	100 m	11.39 (wind: -0.5 m/s)
2014	Oceania Championships	Rarotonga, Cook Islands	16th (sf)	100m	13.91 (wind: +0.1 m/s)
2014	Oceania Championships	Rarotonga, Cook Islands	15th (h)	200m	24.51 w (wind: +6.1 m/s)
2014	Oceania Championships	Rarotonga, Cook Islands	—	Long jump	NM
2015	Oceania Championships	Cairns, Queensland, Australia	25th (h)	100m	11.86 (wind: -1.7 m/s)
2015	Oceania Championships	Cairns, Queensland, Australia	22nd (sf)	200m	24.04 (wind: +1.2 m/s)
