= Jagger Stephens =

Guamanian swimmer

Personal information
- Born: 12 May 1998 (age 28) Hagåtña, Guam

Sport
- Sport: Swimming
- Strokes: Sprint Freestyle
- College team: Brown University

Jagger Stephens (born 12 May 1998) is a Guamanian swimmer. He competed in the men's 100 metre freestyle event at the 2017 World Aquatics Championships.

== Biography ==
In 2019, he represented Guam at the 2019 World Aquatics Championships held in Gwangju, South Korea and he finished in 83rd place in the heats in the men's 50 metre freestyle event. In the men's 100 metre freestyle, he finished in 80th place in the heats. He also represented Guam in the 2020 summer Olympic Games. Jagger now attends the University of Iowa College of Dentistry.
