= Joseph Green (sprinter) =

Guamanian sprinter

Personal information
- Born: December 7, 2001 (age 24) Oahu, Hawaii, U.S.
- Height: 182 cm (6 ft 0 in)

Sport
- Country: Guam
- Sport: Athletics
- Event: Sprinting

Achievements and titles
- Personal best: 100 m: 10.84 (2022)

Joseph Green (born December 7, 2001) is a Guamanian sprinter. He competed in the men's 100 metres event at the 2024 Summer Olympics.

Green graduated from Father Dueñas Memorial School in 2020.
