= Mia Lee =

American artist (born 1992)

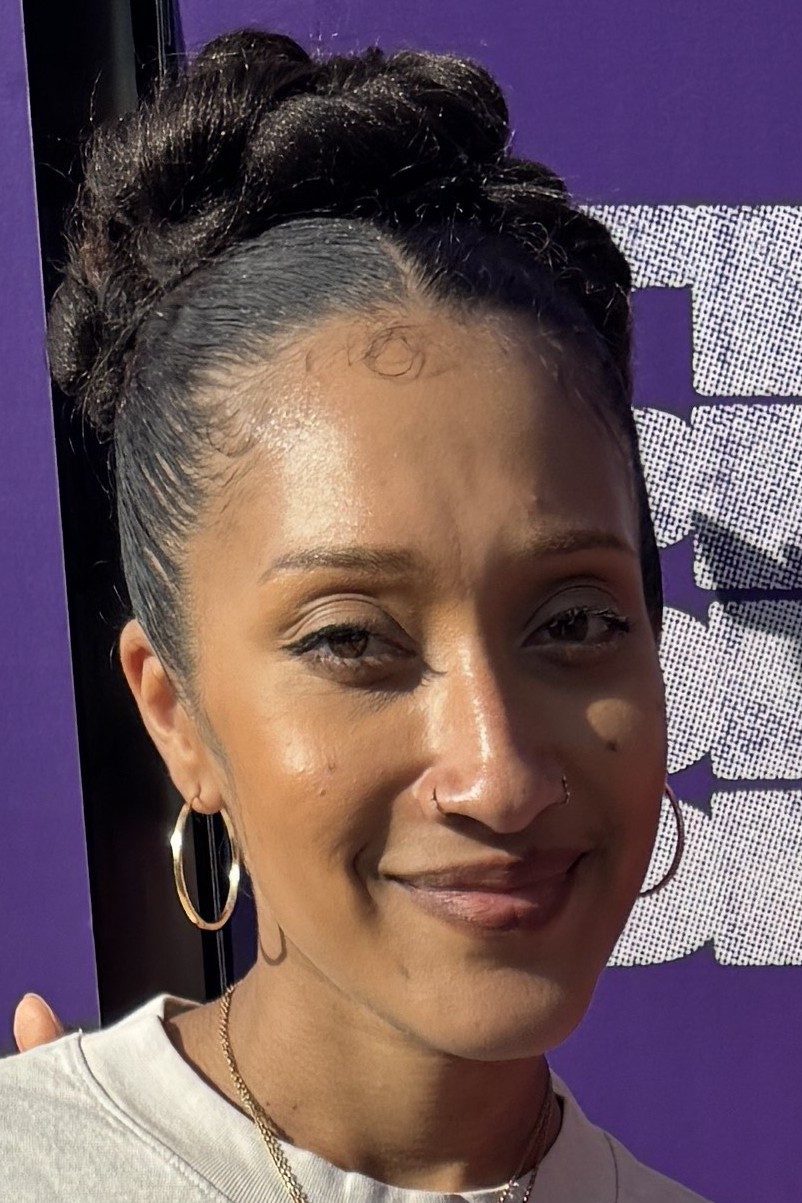
- Lee in 2025
- Born: 1992 (age 33–34); Chicago, Illinois, U.S.
- Education: University of Illinois at Urbana-Champaign; University of Illinois at Chicago
- Occupation: Artist

Mía Lee (born 1992) is an American artist who works primarily in painting and textile design. Her artwork is cartoonish with themes from her own experiences. Mía focuses on figurative paintings that depict familiar and human experiences, delicacies of relationships, and emotions from a first and third person perspective using her characters, "the Gentleman, the Lady, and the Demon." The patterns she uses are then pulled from her larger paintings and translated into wearable textile items to fully immerse the viewer into her world. She has had several high-profile clothes design collaborations.

== Background ==
Lee was born in 1992 in Chicago, Illinois, United States, where she was raised. Her family is from the Caribbean island of Roatán, off the coast of Honduras, and she is regarded as a native of Chatham, the Chicago neighborhood in which she was raised. She has lived in New York City and Los Angeles, before returning to Chicago. Her grandparents moved from Roatán to Chicago's South Side in the 1960s. Lee's work arises from her maternal influences. Her mother was a painter. One grandmother was also a painter (and pianist), while the other was a seamstress. Lee has studied piano under her grandmother's tutelage. She studied costume design at University of Illinois Urbana-Champaign and theater production at the University of Illinois Chicago. Her first doll fashions were made by sewing scraps from her seamstress grandmother.

She has become a figurative artist and a designer. Her contemporary art presents cartoonish figures in expressions of her lived experiences and emotional states. Lee views her art and designs as work created from the perspective of a Caribbean Black woman who was raised on the South Side of Chicago. Her work repeatedly uses three characters – The Gentleman, The Lady, and The Demon – and she uses the color black for skin tone.

== Work ==
Cover art for "YAH Know" by Chance The Rapper (2022, with King Promise)

Lee's COVID-19 pandemic-induced foray into social media facilitated her first artwork sale of Gentleman in Green in 2021. She collaborated with Chance The Rapper at Museum of Contemporary Art, Los Angeles (MOCA) for "Yah Know" (2022, with King Promise) which was a promotional single for his Star Line (2025) album. Her art became the cover art for the single, and she was in the song's music video. The artwork, which portrays a black couple with a burning house as a backdrop, is regarded as an updated version of American Gothic from the perspective of the African diaspora. Her collaboration that began at the MOCA, culminated in a trip with Chance and Vic Mensa to Mensa's fatherland, Ghana.

She has designed clothing collections for Urban Outfitters, Nordstrom and Nike. Her fashion collection for Urban Outfitters was considered to be genderless. In an interview, she stated that she saw Chad Ochocinco wearing one of her jacket designs during an interview with Shannon Sharpe. She has been inspired by creative artists of various ages such as Jimi Hendrix, Prince and Zoë Kravitz. George Condo and Jean-Michel Basquiat are artistic influences who are known for work that is similarly cartoonish. Takashi Murakami is also an inspiration.
