= Guam Track and Field Association =

Governing body of athletics in Guam

- Sport: Athletics
- Abbreviation: GTFA
- Founded: 1976
- Affiliation: IAAF
- Affiliation date: 1986
- Regional affiliation: OAA
- Headquarters: Dededo
- President: Peter Rivera
- Vice president: Joe Taitano
- Secretary: Riza Tugade

Official website
- www.guamtrackandfield.com
- (Guam)

The Guam Track and Field Association (GTFA) is the governing body for the sport of athletics in Guam.

== History ==
The history of running in Guam is well described. The participation of athletes from Guam at the 1966 South Pacific Games is documented.

The foundation of GTFA is reported for 1976, aa well as its affiliation to the IAAF in the year 1986.

Between 2001-2004, former marathon runner Fred Schumann served as president. In 2005, Franklin Tangalin was elected president. Jay Antonio served as president from May 2009 - December 2014.

Current president is Derek Mandell. He was elected in April 2017 for the period 2017-2021. Mandell was re-elected president in August 2021 for the period of 2021-2025.

== Affiliations ==
- International Association of Athletics Federations (IAAF)
- Oceania Athletics Association (OAA)

Moreover, it is part of the following national organisations:

- Guam National Olympic Committee (GNOC)

GTFA was suspended by the GNOC in November 2013, but was reinstated as an associate member in June 2018. GTFA was reinstated as a full-member of GNOC in February 2021.

== National records ==
GTFA maintains the Guamanian records in athletics.
