= Regine Tugade =

Guamanian sprinter

Personal information
- Born: January 28, 1998 (age 28) Dededo, Guam
- Height: 5 ft 4 in (163 cm)
- Weight: 110 lb (50 kg)

Sport
- Sport: Track and field

Achievements and titles
- Personal bests: 60m: 7.56s 100m: 11.76s 200m: 24.24s 400m: 57.89s
- Updated on 2024-08-19

Regine Tugade-Watson (born January 28, 1998) is a Guamanian sprinter. She competed in the women's 100 metres event at the 2015 World Championships in Athletics in Beijing, China, as well as the girl's 200 m event at the 2015 World Youth Championships in Cali, Colombia. She competed in the women's 100 m preliminary round of the 2016 Summer Olympics. Tugade finished third place in her heat but did not progress further. She also competed in her second World Championships in 2017, competing in the 200 m. She holds seven Guamanian national records in athletics. In July 2021 she was a flag bearer in the Parade of Nations at the Tokyo Olympics opening ceremony.

== Early life and education ==
Regine Tugade was born January 28, 1998, in Dededo, Guam. Her parents, Rizaldy and Jeanelyn, are Filipinos who emigrated to Guam.

Tugade began competing in athletics at age 12 because of her older sister. She attended John F. Kennedy High School, and went undefeated in the 100 m dash since her junior year. She lettered in athletics and earned All-Island gold medals four years in a row. Tugade was named the most valuable player for her senior season performance. She competed in the 100 m, 200 m, long jump, and triple jump. Tugade was not aware of the Naval Academy until her senior year, by then Tugade decided she wanted to attend.

== Career ==
=== World Championships ===
Tugade competed in the 2015 World Youth Championships, held in Cali, Colombia. She finished last in her heat in the 200 m with a time of 25.81, and did not advance. Later in the year, Tugade competed in the 2015 World Championships in Beijing, China. She placed 51 out of 54 competitors in the 100 m, finishing with a time of 12.60. She was the only Guamanian athlete to compete in either championship.

She also competed in the 2017 World Championships. She ran in the 200 m, finishing 6th in her heat with a time of 26.22. Tugade did not advance to the semi-finals.

=== College career ===
Tugade competes in the 60 m, 200 m, long jump, and triple jump for indoor events. For outdoor, she competes in the 100 m, 200 m, and long jump. Her best collegiate time in the 100 m is 11.84 at the Patriot League Championships.

Tugade was excused for a week from the Naval Academy's six week training program for plebes to attend the 2016 Summer Olympics. She is the first Navy plebe to compete in the Olympics.

=== Summer Olympics ===
==== 2016 Summer Olympics ====
In 2016, Tugade competed in the Summer Olympics in Rio de Janeiro. She did not qualify for the 100 m dash—her time was 12.26—but she was able to use one of Guam's universality slots. She was one of five Guamanian athletes that participated in these Olympics. About the race, she said "I didn’t run my personal best, but I honestly felt like I ran my hardest and I felt like I performed well. It may not show time-wise, but despite coming straight from Plebe Summer, my body and my mentality feels like I pushed it to my limit". She also said she wants to participate at the 2020 Summer Olympics in Tokyo.

==== 2020 Summer Olympics ====
At the Tokyo Olympics, she ran a time of 12.17 seconds in Heat 2 of the preliminary round, she finished fourth and did not advance to the next round.

==== 2024 Summer Olympics ====
Tugade competed in the women's 100 metres event at the 2024 Summer Olympics, she ran a time of 12.02 seconds during the preliminary round and qualified for round 1 of the competition. She finished eighth in her Heat with a time of 11.87 seconds and did not progress to the semi-finals.

== Records ==
In high school, Tugade set four national and five high school track and field records. In the 2013 Oceania Athletics Championships, Tugade set her very first national record, the outdoor 200 m record with a time of 25.51 seconds. During the 2015 IIAAG high school meet, Tugade broke the 100 m record set by Pollara Cobb, with a time of 12.26. Tugade set the national record for the 400 m in May 2017 with a time of 57.89. The previous record—60.12 set by Naomi Blaz in 2011—was beaten by almost two and a half seconds. In addition to national records, Tugade set high school track and field records in the 100 m, 200 m, 400 m, long jump, and triple jump.

During a match between Navy and Army, Tugade set an indoor national record for the 60 m with a time of 7.67, placing second in the event's final. On setting the record, Tugade said, "Having set another record is an accomplishment, but I have to keep in mind that the season is just getting started, and that there is no room for complacency". In the same meet, she set an indoor national record for the 200 m, with a time of 25.18. This totals to six individual national records and five high school track records.
