= Guam at the 2011 World Aquatics Championships =

About

Flag of Guam

Guam competed at the 2011 World Aquatics Championships in Shanghai, China between July 16 and 31, 2011.

== Swimming ==
Guam qualified 3 swimmers.

Men

Athlete	Event	Heats		Semifinals		Final	
Athlete	Event	Time	Rank	Time	Rank	Time	Rank
Christopher Duenas	Men's 50m Freestyle	24.41	54	did not advance			
Christopher Duenas	Men's 100m Freestyle	53.33	66	did not advance			
Benjamin Schulte	Men's 100m Breaststroke	1:07.62	72	did not advance			
Benjamin Schulte	Men's 200m Breaststroke	2:28.21	52	did not advance			

Women

Athlete	Event	Heats		Semifinals		Final	
Athlete	Event	Time	Rank	Time	Rank	Time	Rank
Pilar Shimizu	Women's 50m Freestyle	28.71	55	did not advance			
Pilar Shimizu	Women's 100m Breaststroke	1:21.19	41	did not advance			
