= Flag of Guam =

U.S. territory flag

Guam
- Banderan Guåhan
- Use: Civil and state flag
- Proportion: 22:41
- Adopted: February 9, 1948; 78 years ago
- Design: A dark blue background with a thin red border and the Seal in the center.
- Designed by: Helen Paul

The flag of Guam was adopted on February 9, 1948. The territorial flag is a dark blue field with a narrow red border on all sides. The red border – a later addition – represents the blood spilled during World War II and earlier Spanish sovereignty. In the center of the flag is the seal of Guam; almond in shape, it depicts a proa sailing in Hagåtña Bay near Hagåtña, and GUAM in red letters.

The shape of the emblem recalls the sling stones used by ancient Chamorro people. The landform in the background depicts the Two Lovers Point cliff on the northern edge of Tumon. The flag was designed by Helen Paul in 1917, without the red border, and accepted the same year by then-Governor of Guam Roy Campbell Smith. The flag was formally adopted in 1930. Military governor Charles Alan Pownall approved the version with the red border in 1948.

As a complement to the Guam flag, and in response to Guam law providing for municipal flags, efforts were made to depict the culture of the island’s 19 municipalities on respective flag. This was collaborated through the Mayors' Council with the assistance of artist Gerard Aflague, a native of Guam. These municipal flags are to reflect unique aspects of each village.

== Design ==
The flag of Guam consists of a blue rectangle of 78 inches (198.12 cm) by 40 inches (101.60 cm), trimmed on all sides with a 2 inches (5.08 cm) wide red border. The coat of arms in the center is twenty-four inches tall and sixteen inches wide.

=== Colours ===
The colours on the flag of Guam are:

Scheme	Blue	Red	Yellow	Black	Green	Blue	Grey
Pantone (Paper)	281 C	032 C	102 C	Black	355 C	285 C	440 C
Web colours	#00205B	#EF3340	#FCE300	#000000	#009639	#0072CE	#382E2C
RGB	0, 32, 91	239, 51, 64	252, 227, 0	0, 0, 0	0, 150, 57	0, 114, 206	56, 46, 44
CMYK	100%, 65%, 0%, 64%	0%, 79%, 73%, 6%	0%, 10%, 100%, 1%	0%, 0%, 0%, 100%	100%, 0%, 62%, 41%	100%, 45%, 0%, 19%	0%, 18%, 21%, 78%

== History ==
The Chamorro people, indigenous to Guam did not have a flag, nor did the island when under Spanish rule (1521–1898). Following the Spanish-American War, Helen L. Paul, the wife of a U.S. naval officer stationed in Guam, had the thought to design a flag for Guam. She designed the emblem after the slingshot stones used by the Chamorros for hunting and sport, and put it on a blue field to resemble the flags of other US territories and states. The emblem shows the mouth of the Hagåtña River with an outrigger canoe and a coconut palm. The cliff in the background is Two Lovers Point.

This flag was officially adopted on July 4, 1917, American Independence day, by the territorial government of Guam. The red border was added to commemorate the suffering of the Japanese occupation of Guam during World War II.

== Gallery ==
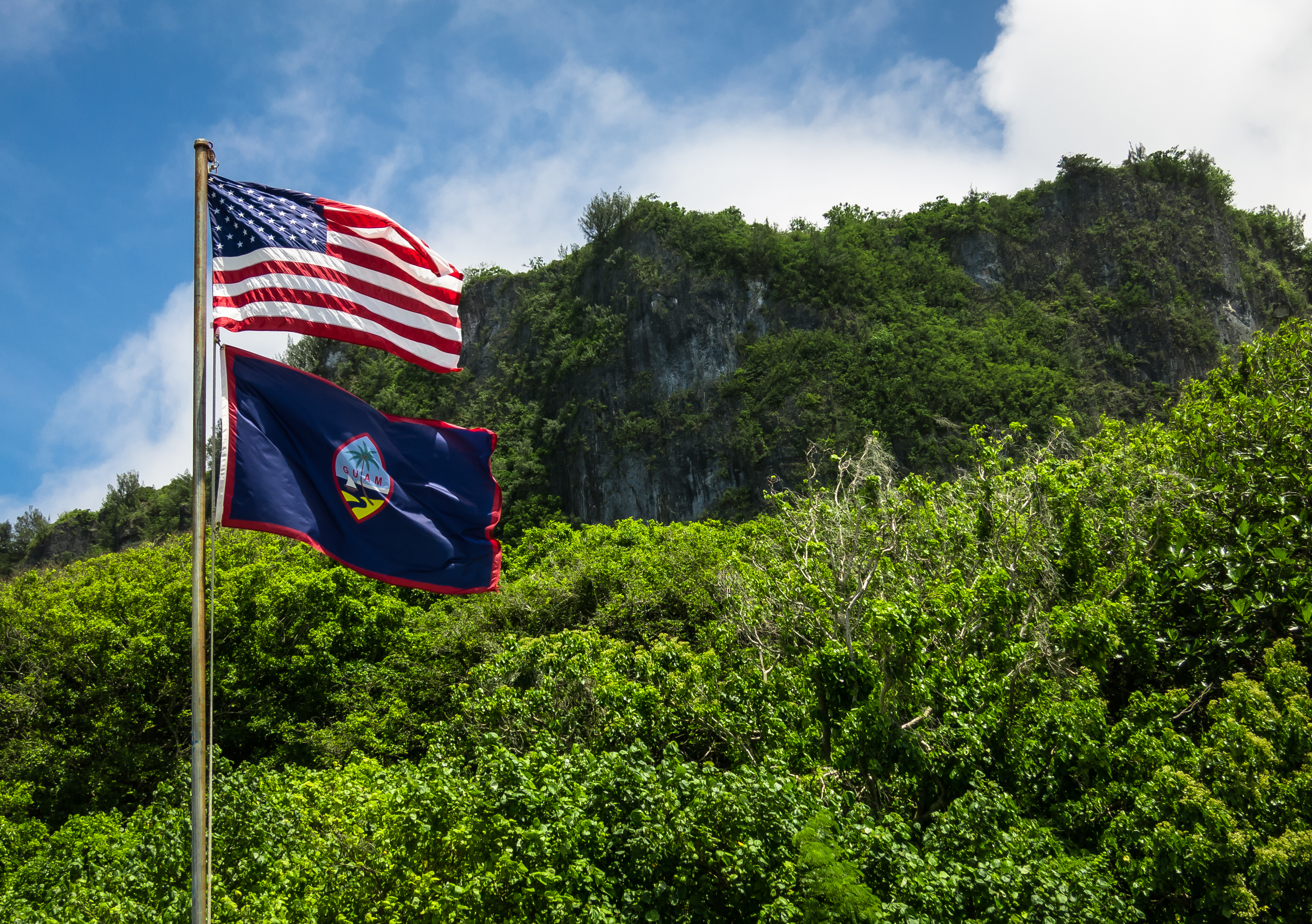
Flag pole at the Guam National Wildlife Refuge unit at Ritidian Point

A soldier of the Guam Army National Guard attaches a miniature Guam flag to his carry-on bag

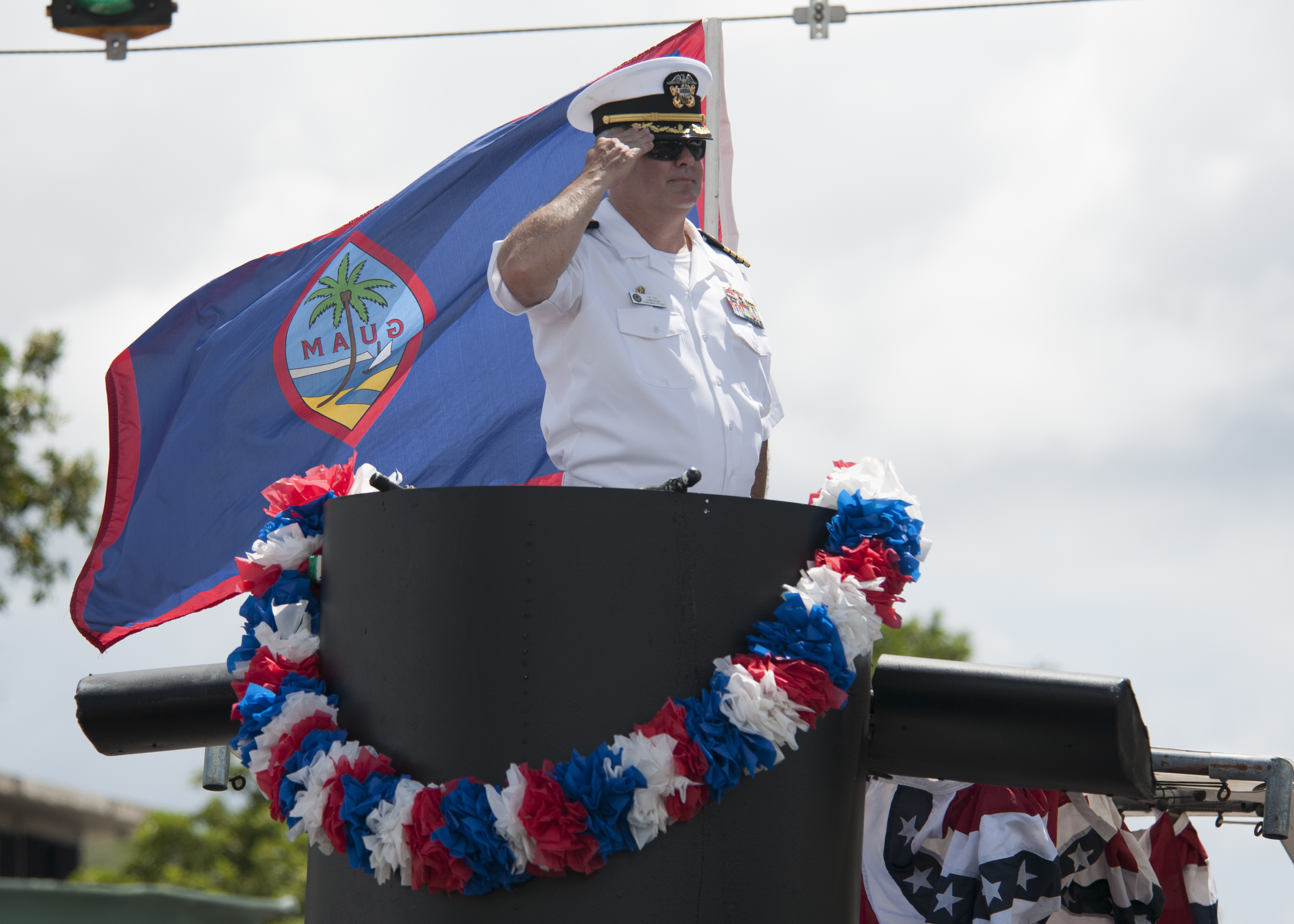
The commander of Submarine Squadron 15 at Naval Base Guam on a float in the 2019 Liberation Day parade

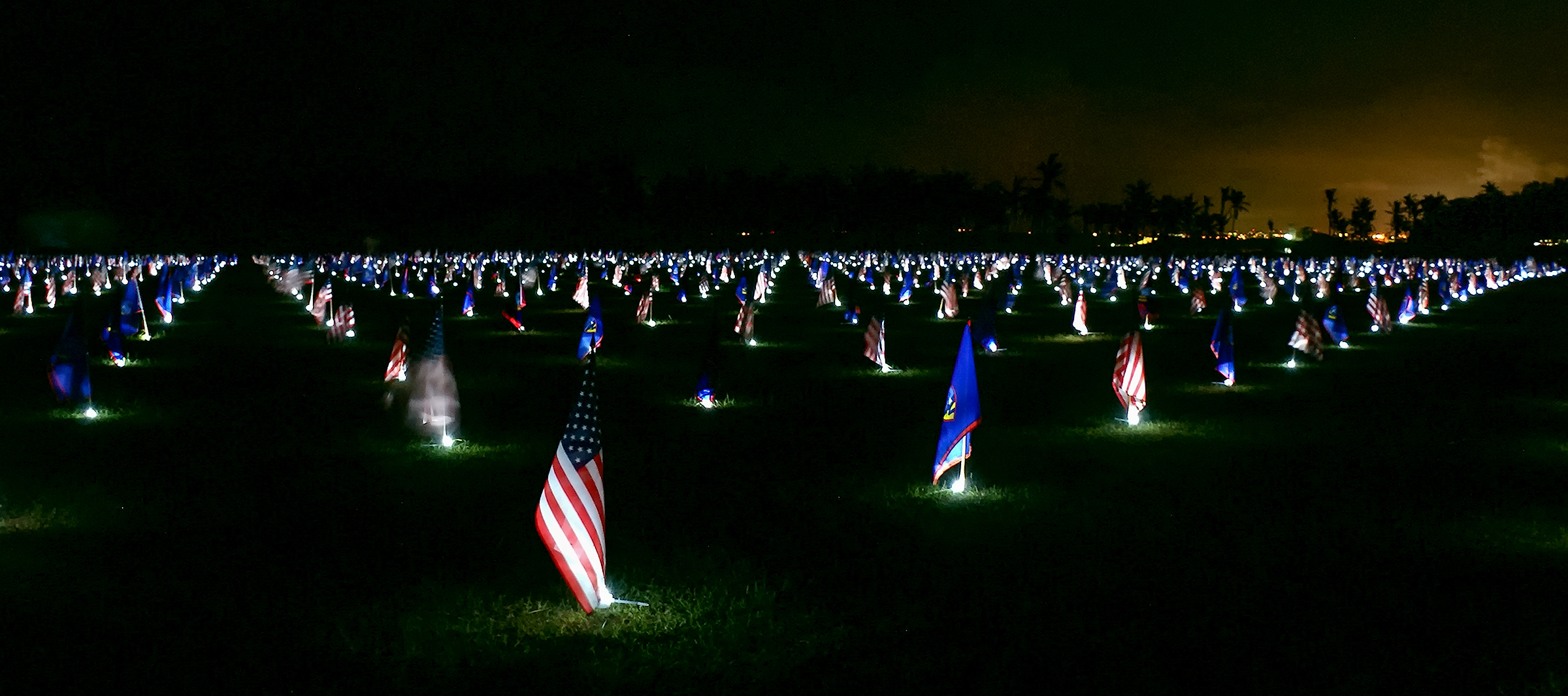
Small U.S. and Guam flags at the Asan unit of War in the Pacific National Historical Park on Memorial Day

== Former flags ==
Flag of Cross of Burgundy during the Spanish East Indies (1565–1785).

Flag of Spain during the Spanish East Indies (1785–1898).

Flag of the United States (1898–1908).

Flag of the United States (1908–1912).

Flag of the United States (1912–1917).

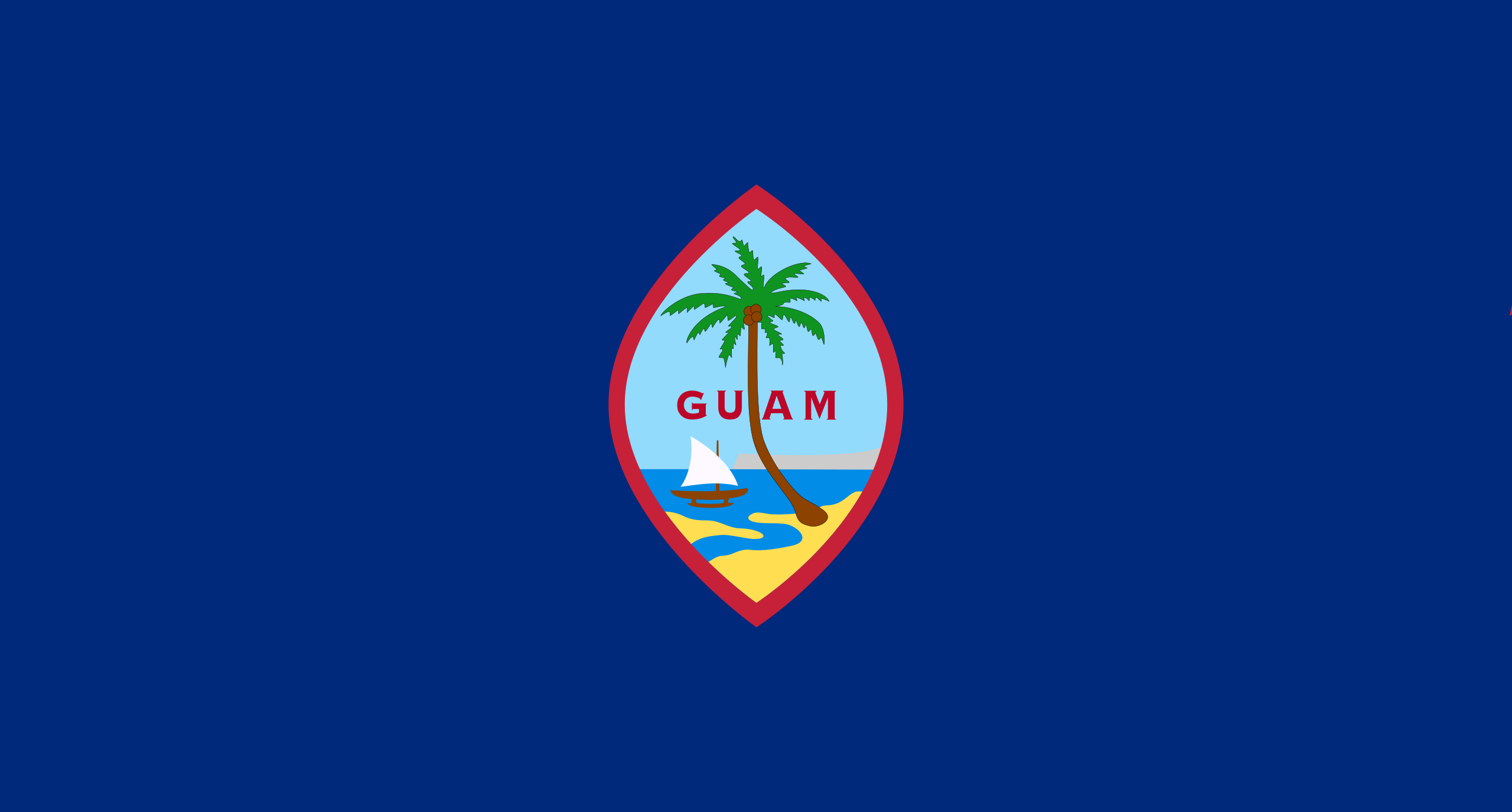
Flag of Guam as recognized by the United States from 1917–1948.

Flag of Japan during the Japanese occupation of Guam (1941–1944).

== See also ==
- Guam
- Seal of Guam
- Flags of the U.S. states
